= Dirck Ten Broeck (disambiguation) =

Dirck Ten Broeck is the name of:

- Dirck Wesselse Ten Broeck (1638–1717), was the Mayor of Albany, New York from 1696 to 1698.
- Dirck Ten Broeck (mayor) (1686–1751), was the Mayor of Albany, New York from 1746 to 1748 (grandson of the above).
- Dirck W. Ten Broeck (1738–1780), was a member of the New York State Senate from 1777 to 1779 (son of the above).
- Dirck Ten Broeck (1765–1833), was Speaker of the New York State Assembly from 1798 to 1800 (son of Abraham Ten Broeck and nephew of the above).
