= Dirck W. Ten Broeck =

American politician

Member of the New York State Senate from the Western District
- In office September 9, 1777 – March 17, 1779
- Preceded by: Inaugural holder
- Succeeded by: Abraham Ten Broeck

Personal details
- Born: Dirck Wessel Ten Broeck; July 26, 1738 Albany, Province of New York, British America
- Died: May 29, 1780 (aged 41) Albany, New York, U.S.
- Spouse: Anna Douw (m. 1761; died 1774)
- Relations: Abraham Ten Broeck (brother)
- Parent(s): Dirck Ten Broeck; Margarita Cuyler Ten Broeck

Dirck Wessel Ten Broeck (July 26, 1738 – May 29, 1780) was an American landowner, soldier, and politician who served in the 1st and 2nd New York State Legislatures.

== Early life ==
Ten Broeck was born on July 26, 1738, in Albany, Province of New York in what was then British America. He was the youngest son of Grietje "Margarita" (née Cuyler) Ten Broeck (1682–1783) and Albany mayor Dirck Ten Broeck, members of the Ten Broeck family which had long been prominent in colonial New York. Among his elder siblings were Catharine, wife of John Livingston (a son of Robert Livingston the Younger), Christina, wife of fellow New York State Senator Philip Livingston, and brother Abraham, married to Elizabeth Van Rensselaer (a daughter of Stephen Van Rensselaer I).

His maternal grandparents were Abraham Cuyler (a brother of former Albany mayor Cornelis Cuyler) and Caatje (née Bleecker) Cuyler (a daughter of former Albany mayor Jan Jansen Bleecker. His paternal grandparents were Catherina (née Loockermans) Ten Broeck and Wessel Ten Broeck (son of former Albany mayor Dirck Wesselse Ten Broeck).

== Career ==
Ten Broeck served as firemaster in 1769 and was a lottery manager in 1772. At the outbreak of the American Revolution, he supported the Patriot cause and "diverted his business stock of tools, weaponry, and supplies" to the Continental Army. During the war, he served as a Lieutenant colonel of the Albany militia and was a member of the Committee of Correspondence. Ten Broeck also served as a United States Lottery Agent and Continental Loan Officer.

=== Post-war career ===
He was a member of the 1st New York State Legislature, having been elected to the New York State Senate to represent one of six seats for the Western District, which consisted of Albany and Tryon counties. His first term, which met from September 9, 1777, to June 30, 1778, was during the first year of George Clinton's governorship, and met at Kingston before meeting at Poughkeepsie. He also served in the 2nd Legislature, which met from October 13, 1778, to March 17, 1779, at Poughkeepsie. In his second Senate term, he was elected to the Council of Appointment (replacing Abraham Yates Jr.) who selected his brother Abraham as the Mayor of Albany in 1779. He was succeeded in his Senate seat by his brother Abraham.

== Personal life ==
On November 25, 1761, Ten Broeck was married Annatje "Anna" Douw (1743–1774), the eldest child of New York State Senator Volkert P. Douw and Anna (née De Peyster) Douw (daughter of Johannes de Peyster III). They lived in the third ward home Ten Broeck had inherited from his father, owned extensive land, but did not have any children together.

Anna died in Albany on February 18, 1774. Ten Broeck died in Albany on May 29, 1780.

Political offices
| Preceded by Inaugural holder | Member of the New York State Senate; 1777–1779 | Succeeded by Abraham Ten Broeck |
