= Abraham Ten Broeck =

American politician, businessman, and brigadier general

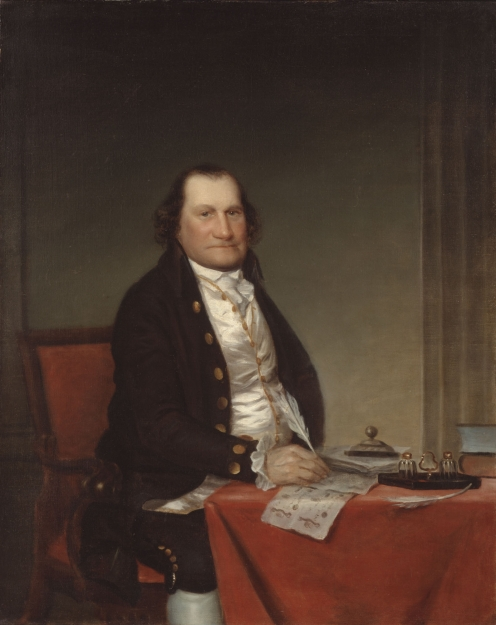

Mayor of Albany, New York
- In office 1796–1798
- Preceded by: Abraham Yates Jr.
- Succeeded by: Philip S. Van Rensselaer
- In office 1779–1783
- Preceded by: John Barclay
- Succeeded by: Johannes Jacobse Beeckman

Member of the New York Provincial Congress
- In office 1775–1777

Personal details
- Born: 13 May 1734 New York City, Province of New York, British America
- Died: 19 January 1810 (aged 75) Albany, New York, U.S.
- Party: Federalist
- Spouse: Elizabeth Van Rensselaer (m. 1773)
- Children: 5, including Dirck Ten Broeck
- Parent(s): Dirck Ten Broeck; Margarita Cuyler
- Relatives: Dirck W. Ten Broeck (brother); Philip Livingston (brother-in-law); Stephen Van Rensselaer II (brother-in-law)

Rensselaerswyck series
Dutch West India Company

The Patroon System

Map of Rensselaerswyck

Patroons of Rensselaerswyck:

Kiliaen van Rensselaer
(1630–1640s)
Various
(1640s–1652)
Jan Baptist van Rensselaer
(1652–1658)
Jeremias van Rensselaer
(1658–1674)
Kiliaen van Rensselaer
(1674–1687)
Kiliaen van Rensselaer
(1687–1719)
Jeremias van Rensselaer
(1719–1745)
Stephen van Rensselaer I
(1745–1747)
Stephen van Rensselaer II
(1747–1769)
Abraham Ten Broeck
(1769–1784, de facto)
Stephen van Rensselaer III
(1784–1839)

Abraham Ten Broeck (May 13, 1734 – January 19, 1810) was a New York politician, businessman, and militia Brigadier General of Dutch descent. He was twice Mayor of Albany, New York and built one of the largest mansions in the area, the Ten Broeck Mansion, that still stands more than 200 years later.

== Early life ==
Abraham Ten Broeck was the son of Dirck Ten Broeck (1686–1751) and Margarita (née Cuyler) (1682–1783). He was the brother of Catharine Ten Broeck Livingston, who was married to John Livingston (a son of Robert Livingston the Younger), Anna Ten Broeck, and Christina Ten Broeck, who was married to Philip Livingston, and New York State Senator Dirck W. Ten Broeck, who married Anna Douw (a daughter of Mayor Volkert P. Douw).

His father was a prominent merchant and politician who served as Albany's mayor beginning in 1746. His paternal grandfather Wessel Ten Broeck, was the son of former Albany mayor Dirck Wesselse Ten Broeck. His maternal grandparents were Abraham Cuyler, the brother of former Albany mayor Cornelis Cuyler, and Caatje (née Bleecker) Cuyler, a daughter of former Albany mayor Jan Jansen Bleecker.

== Career ==
Abraham was sent to New York City to learn business with his sister Christina's husband, Philip Livingston. In 1751, at seventeen years old, he was sent to Europe to learn international business after his father's death, returning to Albany in 1752.

Ten Broeck increased his wealth via trade while in Albany. During the 1750s, he was involved in the provincial militia. In 1759, he was elected to the Albany City Council and in 1760, he was elected to the Province of New York Assembly while continuing to serve Albany.

In 1769, his brother-in-law died at age 27 and Ten Broeck was named co-administrator of the Manor of Rensselaerswyck, a position he held until 1784 when his nephew, Stephen Van Rensselaer III, came of age.

=== American Revolution ===
Ten Broeck continued his military involvement and was named colonel of the Albany County militia in 1775. He was Commander of Ten Broeck's Brigade (New York Militia) at the Second Battle of Saratoga (Battle of Bemis Heights) on October 7, 1777, as part of the Left wing of Major General Horatio Gates. On June 25, 1778, he was named Brigadier General of the Tryon and Albany Counties of Militia and then Albany County only. He resigned March 26, 1781.

He was a member of the New York Provincial Congress from 1775 to 1777 and was its chairman of its Committee of Safety in 1777.

=== After war years ===
After the death of Mayor John Barclay, Ten Broeck was appointed Mayor of Albany in 1779, remaining in office until 1783. In March 1789, he ran for Congress but was defeated by Jeremiah Van Rensselaer. In 1796, Mayor Abraham Yates Jr. died and Ten Broeck was again appointed Mayor of Albany, remaining in office until 1798 when he was succeeded by another nephew, Philip Schuyler Van Rensselaer (1767–1824).

Ten Broeck was a Federalist presidential elector in 1796, and cast his votes for John Adams and Thomas Pinckney.

== Personal life ==
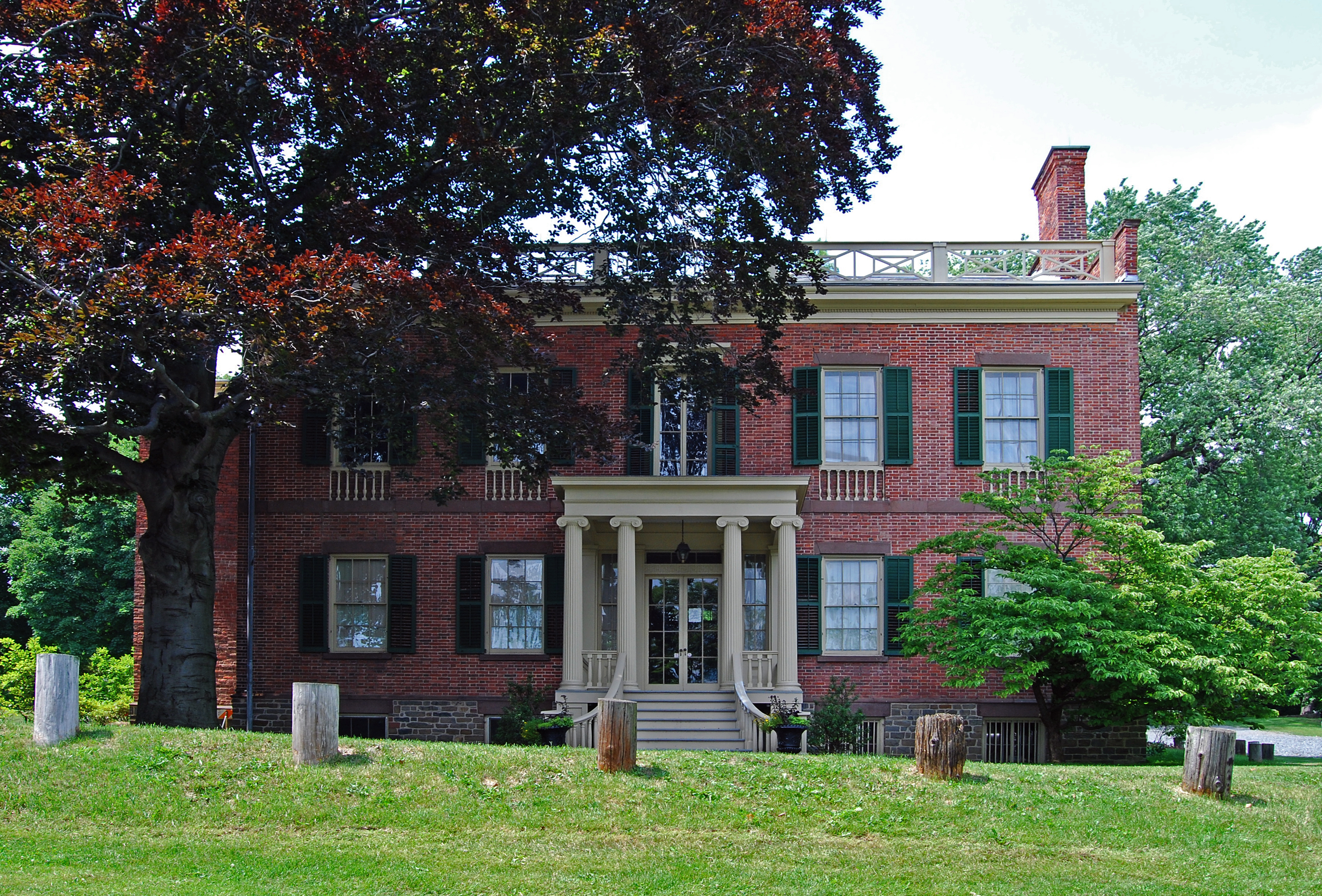
"Prospect", the Ten Broeck Mansion, built 1798.

In November 1763, he married Elizabeth van Rensselaer (1734–1813), a daughter of Stephen van Rensselaer I (the 7th Patroon and 4th Lord of the Manor of Rensselaerswyck) and a sister of patroon Stephen van Rensselaer II. Elizabeth and her brother were great-grandchildren of the first native-born mayor of New York City, Stephanus van Cortlandt. Together, they were the parents of five children, including:

- Dirck Ten Broeck (1765–1833), who married Cornelia Stuyvesant (d. 1825), a daughter of Petrus and Margaret (née Livingston) Stuyvesant.
- Elizabeth ten Broeck (1772–1848), who married Rensselaer Schuyler (1773–1847), a son of Philip Schuyler and Catherine Van Rensselaer, and the younger brother of Angelica Schuyler Church, Elizabeth Schuyler Hamilton, Peggy Schuyler Van Rensselaer, and Philip Jeremiah Schuyler.
- Margarita ten Broeck (1776–1812), who died unmarried.

By the mid-1760s, Ten Broeck was one of Albany's wealthiest men. The Ten Broecks lived in a house that was assessed equally with the Schuyler Mansion and Yates Mansion in 1788. In 1797, it was burned in a fire that destroyed several city blocks. Construction was started on the new home soon after, and the family resided there beginning in 1798 calling the place "Prospect". The historic mansion still stands in Arbor Hill more than 200 years later.

Ten Broeck died on Friday, January 19, 1810.

== Legacy ==
The towns of Ten Broeck, Alabama and Ten Broeck, Kentucky as well as Tenbroeck Avenue in the Bronx, New York City were named after him.

== See also ==
- Manor of Rensselaerswyck

Civic offices
Preceded by Abraham Yates Jr.	Mayor of Albany, New York; 1796–1798	Succeeded by Philip S. Van Rensselaer
Preceded by John Barclay	Mayor of Albany, New York; 1779–1783	Succeeded by Johannes Jacobse Beeckman
