= Hendrick Hansen =

Politician

Member of the New York Provincial Assembly
- In office 1699–1724

Mayor of Albany, New York
- In office 1698–1699
- Preceded by: Dirck Wesselse Ten Broeck
- Succeeded by: Pieter Van Brugh

Personal details
- Born: February 26, 1665 Albany, Province of New York
- Died: February 17, 1724 (aged 58) Albany, Province of New York
- Spouse: Debora Van Dam (m. 1692)
- Children: 7, including Johannes
- Parent(s): Hans Hendrickse; Eva Gillis de Meyer

Hendrick Hansen (February 26, 1665 – February 17, 1724) was the fifth Mayor of Albany, New York.

== Early life ==
Hendrick Hansen was born on February 26, 1665, in Albany. He was the son of Hans Hendrickse, a Beverwyck trader, and Eva Gillis de Meyer Hansen.

== Career ==
Hansen was a prominent landholder and trader who inherited substantial property from his father. In 1693, he was elected as Assistant Alderman to the Albany City Council, representing the Third Ward. In 1695, he was elected Alderman and served until 1698 when he was appointed mayor.

In 1698, he was appointed the fifth Mayor of Albany, New York, succeeding Dirck Wesselse Ten Broeck. He served in that role until 1699 when Pieter Van Brugh became the sixth mayor. In 1699, he was elected to represent Albany in the New York General Assembly, serving five terms until his death in 1724. In 1703, while serving in the Assembly, he was again elected Alderman for the Third Ward.

He served for a total of 14 years as a Commissioners of Indian Affairs, having been appointed in 1710, 1712, 1715, and 1720.

== Personal life ==
In 1692, he married Debora Van Dam (c. 1670–1742), the only daughter of Claes Ripse Van Dam (d. 1709), an carpenter and Justice of the Peace for Albany County, and Maria (née Bords) Van Dam. Together, they were the parents of seven children, including:

- Debora Hansen (1693–1745), who married Jacobus Beekman (1685–1739) in 1714.
- Johannes "Hans" Hansen (1695–1756), who also served as Albany mayor and who married Sara Cuyler (b. 1693), daughter of mayor Johannes Cuyler, in 1723.
- Maria Hansen (1697–c. 1697), who married David A. Schuyler (1692–c. 1697), eldest son of Abraham D. and Geertruy (née Ten Broeck) Schuyler, in 1725.
- Nicholas Hansen (b. 1698) who married Engeltie Wemp in 1722.
- Ryckert "Richard" Hansen (1703–1766), who married Sara Thong (d. 1733), in New York City, in May 1727. After her death, he married Catharina Ten Broeck (1717–c. 1780s), daughter of Johannes Ten Broeck and Catharina (née Van Rensselaer) Ten Broeck, in July 1738.

Hansen drew up his will on September 2, 1723. Hansen died on February 17, 1724, in Albany.

=== Descendants ===
Through his eldest daughter Debora, he was the grandfather of Albany mayor Johannes Jacobse Beeckman (1733–1802).

== See also ==
- History of Albany, New York

Political offices
Preceded by Dirck Wesselse Ten Broeck	Mayor of Albany, New York; 1698–1699	Succeeded by Pieter Van Brugh
