= Dirck Ten Broeck (mayor) =

American politician (1686–1751)

Mayor of Albany, New York
- In office 1746–1748
- Governor: George Clinton
- Preceded by: Cornelis Cuyler
- Succeeded by: Jacob Coenraedt Ten Eyck

Member of the New York Provincial Assembly
- In office 1728–1737

Personal details
- Born: December 4, 1686 Albany, Province of New York
- Died: January 7, 1751 (aged 64) Albany, Province of New York
- Spouse: Margarita Cuyler (m. 1714)
- Children: 12, including Abraham
- Parent(s): Wessel Ten Broeck; Catherina Loockermans
- Relatives: Dirck Wesselse Ten Broeck (grandfather); Johannes Cuyler (uncle); Philip Livingston (son-in-law)

Dirck Ten Broeck (December 4, 1686 – January 7, 1751) Served as Mayor of Albany, New York from 1746 to 1748.

== Early life ==
Dirck Ten Broeck was born on December 4, 1686, in Albany, New York. He was the son of Wessel Ten Broeck (1664–1747) and Catherina Loockermans (1669–1729).

His paternal grandparents were former Albany mayor Dirck Wesselse Ten Broeck (1638–1717) and Christyna Van Buren (1644–1729). His paternal aunt, Elsje Ten Broeck (d. 1752), was married to Johannes Cuyler, who succeeded him as Albany mayor.

== Career ==
In 1716, he joined the City Council after being elected Assistant Alderman for the Third Ward. In 1722, he was elected Alderman. In 1728, he was commissioned Recorder (Deputy Mayor) of the City by the Colonial Governor John Montgomerie. He served as Alderman for many years, as well as Commissioners of Indian Affairs for a total of 16 years, having been appointed in 1729, 1732, 1734, 1738, 1739, 1742, and 1745.

Ten Broeck also served as a member of the New York General Assembly from 1728 to 1737.

In 1746, he was appointed Mayor of Albany by Gov. George Clinton, succeeding Cornelis Cuyler. He served until 1748, when Jacob Coenraedt Ten Eyck became the new mayor. Upon his father's death in 1747, he inherited substantial real estate and expanded his holdings, which he then passed along to his sons.

== Personal life ==
In 1714, he married Grietje "Margarita" Cuyler (1682–1783), the daughter of Abraham Cuyler (1665–1747) and Caatje (née Bleecker) Cuyler (1670–1734), a daughter of former Albany mayor Jan Jansen Bleecker. She was also the niece of his uncle and the former Albany mayor Cornelis Cuyler. Together, they were the parents of twelve children, including:

- Catharine Ten Broeck (1715–1802), who was married to John Livingston (1709–1791), a son of Robert Livingston the Younger.
- Anna Ten Broeck (1717–1731), who died young.
- Christina Ten Broeck (1718–1801), who was married to Philip Livingston (1716–1778), son of Philip Livingston, 2nd Lord of Livingston Manor.
- Maria Ten Broeck (1721–1805), who married Gerardus Groesbeck (1709–1788).
- Sara Ten Broeck (1725–1801), who married Johannes Henrickse Ten Eyck (1710–1794), son of Hendrick and Margarita (née Bleecker) Ten Eyck, in 1746.
- Margarita Ten Broeck (b. 1731), who married Stephen Richard (1732–1773), a member of the Van Rensselaer family, in 1765. After his death, she married widow Gerardus Lansing (1723–1808) in 1778.
- Abraham Ten Broeck (1734–1810), who married Elizabeth Van Rensselaer (1734–1813), a daughter of Stephen Van Rensselaer I (the 7th Patroon and 4th Lord of the Manor of Rensselaerswyck) and a sister of Stephen Van Rensselaer II.
- Dirck Ten Broeck (1738–1780), who married Anna Douw (1743–1774), a daughter of New York State Senator Volkert P. Douw, in 1761.

Dirck Ten Broeck died on January 7, 1751.

== See also ==
- History of Albany, New York

Political offices
Preceded by Cornelis Cuyler	Mayor of Albany, New York; 1746–1748	Succeeded by Jacob Coenraedt Ten Eyck
