= Cornelius Cuyler =

British Army general

General Sir Cornelius Cuyler Bt
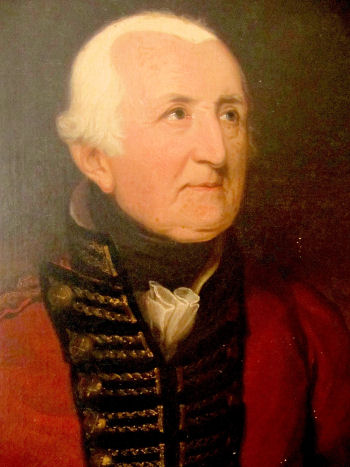
- Born: 31 October 1740; Albany, New York
- Died: 8 March 1819 (aged 78); St John's Lodge, Welwyn
- Relatives: Cornelis Cuyler (father); Abraham Cuyler (brother)
- Military career
- Allegiance: Great Britain; United Kingdom
- Branch: British Army
- Rank: General
- Conflicts: French and Indian War; American War of Independence; French Revolutionary Wars

General Sir Cornelius Cuyler, 1st Baronet (31 October 1740 – 8 March 1819) was a British Army officer who became Lieutenant-Governor of Portsmouth.

== Early life ==
Cuyler was born in Albany, New York on 31 October 1740, the son of Cornelis Cuyler and Catalyntie Schuyler, who was a descendant of the Schuyler family. Among his siblings was prominent American loyalist, Abraham Cornelius Cuyler (1742–1810), who married Jannetje "Janet" Glen, sister of Henry Glen (1739–1814).

His father was the oldest surviving son of twelve children born to his grandfather, Albany Mayor Johannes Cuyler (1661–1740), and grandmother, Elsje (née Ten Broeck) Cuyler (d. 1752). His grandfather was an admitted freeman of New York City and served for 22 years as a Commissioner of Indian Affairs.

== Military career ==
Cuyler was commissioned as an ensign into the 55th Regiment of Foot in May 1759 during the French and Indian War. He took part in the Battle of Ticonderoga in July 1759 and the Battle of the Thousand Islands in August 1760. He became aide-de-camp to General Sir William Howe in July 1775 and fought at the Battle of Long Island in August 1776, Battle of Brandywine in September 1777 and the Battle of Germantown in October 1777 during the American War of Independence before commanding his regiment at the Battle of Monmouth in June 1778.

He became Quartermaster-General in the West Indies in November 1782, Commander-in-chief in the West Indies in November 1792 and then Lieutenant-Governor of Portsmouth and General Officer Commanding South-West District in January 1796. He became Commander-in-Chief in Portugal in January 1799 during the French Revolutionary Wars. He was promoted to full general in September 1803 and created a baronet on 29 October 1814.

== Personal life ==
In 1763, Cuyler was married to Anne Wendell. After his death, he was succeeded in his baronetcy by his son, Charles Cuyler (1794–1862).

Cuyler died on 8 March 1819.

Military offices
Preceded by Thomas Trigge	GOC South-West District; 1796–1799	Succeeded by Thomas Murray
Preceded by Henry Watson Powell	Colonel of the 69th (South; Lincolnshire) Regiment of Foot; 1794–1819	Succeeded by Sir William Carr Beresford, 1st Viscount Beresford
Baronetage of the United Kingdom
New creation	Baronets (of St John's Lodge); 1814–1819	Succeeded by Charles Cuyler
