= Johannes Hansen =

Johannes Hansen may refer to:

- Johannes Hansen (mayor) (1695–1756), mayor of Albany, New York
- Johannes Hansen (gymnast) (1882–1959), Danish gymnast
- Johannes Hansen (sculptor) (1903–1995), Danish sculptor
- Johannes Hansen (mayor) (1695–1756), mayor of Albany, New York
- Johannes Hansen (manufacturer), a Danish furniture manufacturer
- Johannes Hansen (footballer)
