= Johannes Hansen (mayor) =

American politician

Mayor of Albany, New York
- In office 1754–1756
- Governor: James De Lancey
- Preceded by: Robert Sanders
- Succeeded by: Sybrant Gozen Van Schaick
- In office 1731–1732
- Governor: John Montgomerie
- Preceded by: Johannes de Peyster III
- Succeeded by: Johannes de Peyster III

Personal details
- Born: 1695 Albany, Province of New York
- Died: 1756 (aged 60–61) Albany, Province of New York
- Spouse: Sara Cuyler (m. 1723)
- Children: 7
- Parent(s): Hendrick Hansen; Debora Van Dam

Johannes Hansen or Hans Hansen (1695 – 1756) was the Mayor of Albany, New York from 1731 to 1732.

== Early life ==
Hansen was born on 1695 in Albany, New York. He was the eldest son of seven children born to Albany mayor Hendrick Hansen (1665–1724) and Debora Van Dam (c. 1670–1742), His siblings were Debora Hansen (1693–1745), who married Jacobus Beekman (1685–1739), Maria Hansen (1697–c. 1697), who married David A. Schuyler (1692–c. 1697), Nicholas Hansen (b. 1698), who married Engeltie Wemp, and Ryckert "Richard" Hansen (1703–1766), who married Sara Thong (d. 1733) and after her death, he married Catharina Ten Broeck (1717–c. 1780s).

His paternal grandparents were Eva Gillis de Meyer and Hans Hendrickse, a Beverwyck trader, and Eva Gillis de Meyer Hansen. His mother was the only daughter of Claes Ripse Van Dam (d. 1709), an carpenter and Justice of the Peace for Albany County and Maria (née Bords) Van Dam.

== Career ==
According to his fathers 1723 will, and upon his father's death in 1724, he inherited, by right of primogeniture, his father's "lot of ground in Albany, on the north side thereof." He also received, equally divided with his brother Nicholas, his father's farm and 2,000 acres of land that was situated "on the north side of the Maqueses river" near Ticonderoga. The land was granted to him by Patent from Brig. Gen. Robert Hunter who served Governor of the Province of New York. One was to get the house, barn, barracks, and other buildings along with the responsibility to assist and pay upkeep towards the other half. His father's mill was to be held in partnership between the sons.

In 1721, he served as a Constable of Albany. In 1731, surprising many, he was appointed the Mayor of Albany, New York by John Montgomerie, succeeding Johannes de Peyster III. He served in that role for a year until De Peyster was again appointed mayor. He was again appointed mayor in 1754 by James De Lancey, succeeding Robert Sanders. He was reappointed and died in office in 1756.

Again following after his father, he served as a Commissioners of Indian Affairs for a total of 2 years, having been appointed in 1754.

== Personal life ==
In 1723, he married Sara Cuyler (b. 1693), daughter of mayor Johannes Cuyler (1661–1740) and Elsje Ten Broeck (d. 1752), herself the daughter of Albany Mayor Dirck Wesselse Ten Broeck (1638–1717). Together, they were the parents of seven children, including:

- Hendrick Hansen (b. 1723), who died before his father.
- Pieter Hansen (b. 1737), who married Rachel Fonda in 1781.
- Johannes Hansen.

Hansen left a will dated March 10, 1756, and died later that same year 1756 in Albany.

== See also ==
- History of Albany, New York

Political offices
Preceded by Robert Sanders	Mayor of Albany, New York; 1754–1756	Succeeded by Sybrant Gozen Van Schaick
Preceded by Johannes de Peyster III	Mayor of Albany, New York; 1731–1732	Succeeded by Johannes de Peyster III
