= John De Peyster Douw =

American politician

- Born: January 20, 1756
- Died: February 22, 1835 (aged 79)
- Occupations: Merchant, lawyer, soldier, civic leader

Johannes "John" De Peyster Douw (January 20, 1756 – February 22, 1835) was an American merchant, lawyer, soldier and civic leader.

== Early life ==
Douw was born on January 20, 1756, and grew up in his parents' home in Albany and their country home known as Wolvenhook on the eastern bank of the Hudson River, about a mile below Albany. He was the eighth of nine children born to Anna (née De Peyster) Douw (1723–1794), and Volkert P. Douw, who served as Mayor of Albany and a New York State Senator and was a close friend of General Philip Schuyler.

His father was the only surviving son of Petrus Douw and Anna (née Van Rensselaer) Douw (a daughter of Hendrick van Rensselaer). His maternal grandfather was Johannes de Peyster III, who also served as mayor of Albany.

Douw was sent to Yale from where he graduated in 1777.

== Career ==
Douw trained as a merchant by his grandfather until the outbreak of the Revolutionary War. He joined the Continental Army, serving as an ensign in the Rensselaerswyck company of the Albany County militia, and the commissary department. He took part in the Sullivan Expedition against Loyalists and the four Nations of the Haudenosaunee (which had sided with the British) in 1779. He was a close friend of Gilbert du Motier, Marquis de Lafayette.

In 1782, he was appointed Albany County Surrogate. In 1788, he was elected Alderman for the first ward. Following the death of an uncle, he inherited a townhouse on State Street in 1787. Although he trained as a lawyer, he was better known as a merchant and was heavily involved in Albany real estate. His store was located on South Market Street.

== Personal life ==
Douw was married three times. He married his first wife, Deborah Beekman (1763–1791) on December 23, 1787, at the house of Maria (née Sanders) Beekman and Johannes Jacobse Beekman, her parents. Together, they were the parents of:

- Volkert Peter Douw (1790–1869),

After the death of his first wife on July 23, 1791, he married Margaret Livingston (1768–1802) on December 20, 1795, at the Hermitage in the Livingston Manor. Margaret was a daughter of Col. Peter Robert Livingston and a granddaughter of Robert Livingston, 3rd Lord of Livingston Manor. In 1800, their household included seven family members and four slaves. Before his wife died on January 20, 1802, they were the parents of:

- Anna DePeyster Douw (1798–1871), who married Samuel Stringer Lush (1783–1841), a son of Stephen Lush. After his death in 1841, she married William Tremper Cuyler (1802–1864), the widower of Charlotte Hanford and Nancy Bancker Stewart, in 1850.
- Margaret Livingston Douw (1798–1878), who married Alanson Abbe (1795–1864) in 1844.
- Louisa Douw (1801–1802), who died young.

His third marriage was in 1811 to his twenty-nine year old cousin Catherine Douw Gansevoort (1782–1848), when he was fifty-two. Catherine was a daughter of Leonard Gansevoort Jr. and Maria (née Van Rensselaer) Gansevoort, in 1811.

- John DePeyster Douw (1812–1901), who married Marianna Chandler Lanman, daughter of Mayor Charles J. Lanman (son of U.S. Senator James Lanman).
- Mary Douw (1815–1815), who died young.
- Catharine Louisa Douw (1817–1891), who married John Fonda Townsend (1809–1874).
- Harriet Maria Douw (1824–1852), who married William Clarkson Johnson (1823–1893) in 1847.

Douw died on February 22, 1835. He was buried at the Albany Rural Cemetery in Menands, New York. His widow died in April 1848.
