= Jacob Coenraedt Ten Eyck =

American lawyer & politician (1705–1793)

Mayor of Albany, New York
- In office 1748–1750
- Governor: George Clinton
- Preceded by: Dirck Ten Broeck
- Succeeded by: Robert Sanders

Personal details
- Born: January 15, 1705 Albany, Province of New York
- Died: September 9, 1793 (aged 88) Albany, New York
- Resting place: Albany Rural Cemetery
- Spouse: Catharine Cuyler (m. 1736; died 1790)
- Relations: Egbert Ten Eyck (grandson)
- Children: 4, including Anthony
- Parent(s): Coenradt Ten Eyck; Gerritje Van Schaick

Jacob Coenraedt Ten Eyck (April 1705 in Albany, New York – September 9, 1793, in Albany, Albany County, New York) was an American lawyer and politician from New York.

== Early life ==
Jacob Coenraedt Ten Eyck was born in April 1705 in Albany, New York. He was one of ten children born to Coenradt Ten Eyck (1678–1753), a silversmith, and Gerritje Van Schaick (b. 1687). His siblings included Barent Ten Eyck (1714–1795), Anna Margarita Ten Eyck (1721–1802), who married John Barclay, also a Mayor of Albany, Gerritje Ten Eyck (1728–1782), who married Pieter Gansevoort (1725–1809), a grandson of Harmen Harmense Gansevoort.

His maternal grandparents were Anthony Van Schaick (1655–1737) and Maria (née Vanderpoel) Van Schaick. His paternal grandparents were Jacob Coenraedtsen Ten Eyck (1647–1693), a shoemaker who was born in the Netherlands, and Geertruy Coeymans. They moved to Albany sometime after 1664 and established the Ten Eyck family in the Albany region.

== Career ==
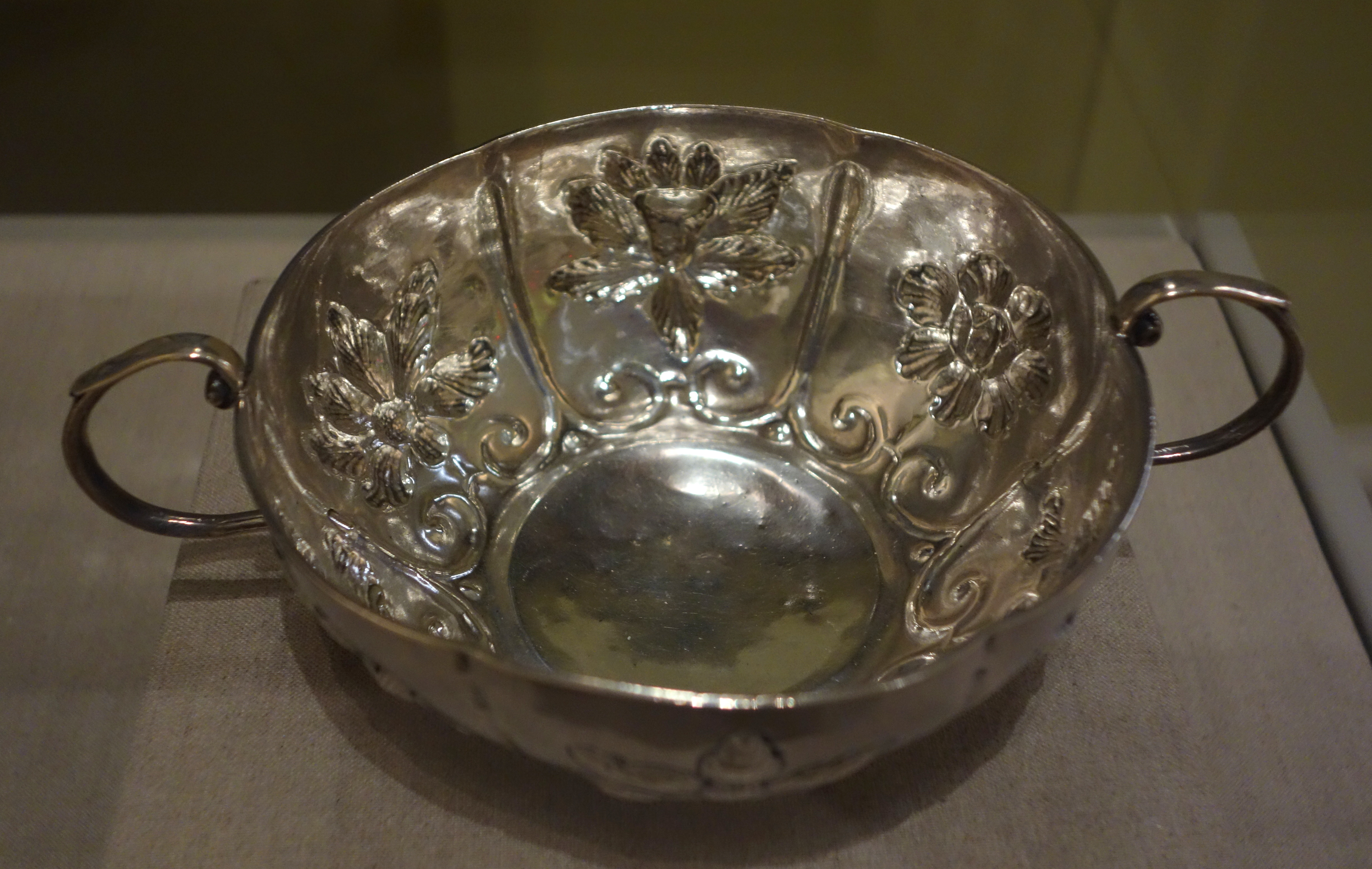
Paneled brandywine bowl, c. 1730-1750, by Ten Eyck

At age fifteen, he went to New York to apprentice with Charles LeRoux (1689–1745), a prominent silversmith and engraver. While in New York, Ten Eyck learned his craft and began to work with gold. By 1736, Ten Eyck had returned to Albany and married.

In Albany, Ten Eyck served as constable and firemaster before winning election to the City Council as an assistant in 1734. In 1741, he was elected Alderman for the First Ward, holding that position for several years. In 1747, he was appointed Sheriff of Albany County.

In 1748, he was named Mayor of Albany and served for two years, succeeding Dirck Ten Broeck (1686–1751), who was married to Margarita Cuyler, his wife's sister. Following his term as mayor, he was again elected Alderman in 1750 for the Second Ward, serving until 1762. Ten Eyck also served three years as an Albany commissioner of Indian Affairs, in 1752 and 1754.

During the Revolutionary War, he was a member of Albany’s Committee of Safety.

== Personal life ==
On August 17, 1736, he married Catharine Cuyler (1709–1790), the daughter of Abraham Cuyler (c. 1663 – 1747), Albany commissioner of Indian Affairs, and Catharina (née Bleecker) Cuyler (1670–1734). Together, they were the parents of four children baptized between 1741 and 1749 in the Albany Dutch Church where they were members. Their children were:

- Anthony E. Ten Eyck (1739/49–1816), who married Maria Egberts (1748–1819) in 1775 and was a member of the Constitutional Convention of 1787, judge of Rensselaer County and member of the New York State Senate.
- Conrad Ten Eyck (1741–1777), who married Charlotte Ten Eyck (1752–1833), daughter of Andries C. Ten Eyck.
- Abraham Jacob Ten Eyck (1743–1824), who married Annatje Lansing (1746–1824), daughter of Jacob Lansing Jr. and Marytje Egberts, in 1769.
- Catharine Ten Eyck (b. 1746)

Ten Eyck was one of the wealthiest Albany businessmen with his property regularly assessed around the top of all households. He died on September 9, 1793, in Albany, New York. He was buried at the Albany Rural Cemetery.

== See also ==
- Ten Eyck family

Political offices
Preceded by Dirck Ten Broeck	Mayor of Albany, New York; 1748–1750	Succeeded by Robert Sanders
