= Ten Broeck, Alabama =

Unincorporated community in Alabama, United States

- Unincorporated community
- Location within Alabama
- Coordinates: 34°25′04″N 85°59′13″W
- Country: United States
- State: Alabama
- County: DeKalb
- Elevation: 1,188 ft (362 m)
- Time zone: UTC-6 (Central (CST))
  - Summer (DST): UTC-5 (CDT)
- Area code: 256

Ten Broeck, also spelled Tenbroeck, is an unincorporated community in DeKalb County, in the U.S. state of Alabama.

== History ==
A post office called Ten Broeck was established in 1880, and remained in operation until 1905. The community was named after a local horse. The horse was likely named after member of the Continental Congress Abraham Ten Broeck.

== Demographics ==
Historical population
Census	Pop.	Note	%±
1930	137		—
U.S. Decennial Census

According to the 1930 U.S. Census, Ten Broeck incorporated in 1925. It was the only time it was listed on the census rolls to date.
