= Isaac Low =

American politician

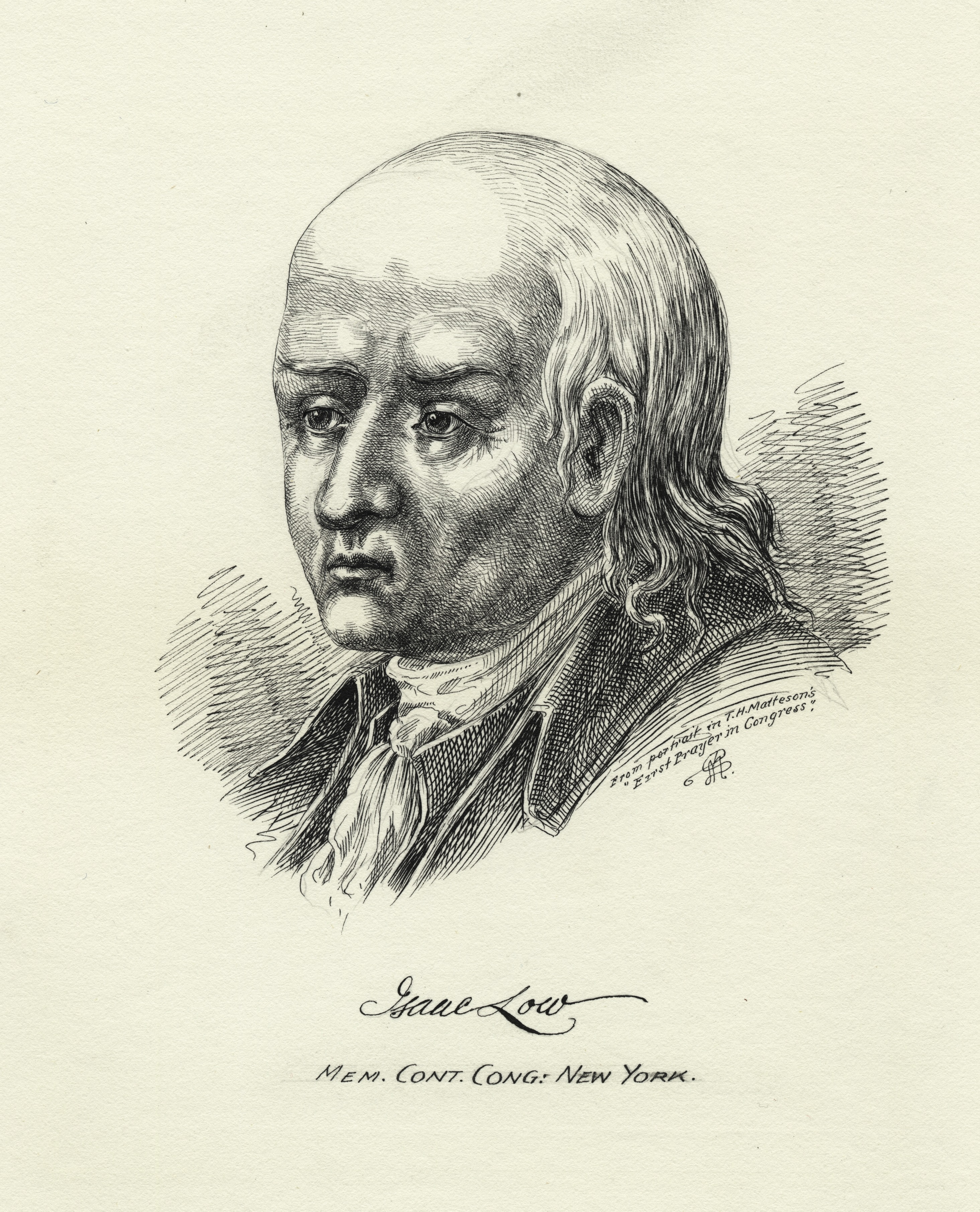

Member of the Continental Congress
- In office September 5, 1774 – October 26, 1774

Personal details
- Born: 13 April 1731 Piscataway, Province of New Jersey, British America
- Died: 25 August 1791 (aged 60) Cowes, Isle of Wight, Great Britain
- Spouse: Margarita Cuyler (m. 1760)
- Children: Isaac Low Jr.
- Parent(s): Cornelius Low Jr. Johanna Gouverneur
- Relatives: Nicholas Low (brother); Abraham Cuyler (brother-in-law); Cornelius Cuyler (brother-in-law); Cornelis Cuyler (father-in-law)
- Occupation: Merchant

Isaac Low (April 13, 1731 – August 25, 1791) was an American merchant in New York City who served as a member of the Continental Congress, where he signed the Continental Association. He later served as a delegate to the New York Provincial Congress. Though originally a Patriot, he later joined the Loyalist cause in the American Revolution.

== Early life ==
Low was born on April 13, 1731, at Raritan Landing in Piscataway, Province of New Jersey. He was the son of Cornelius Low Jr. and Johanna (née Gouverneur) Low and the brother of Nicholas Low. His father was a well-established merchant and shipper who built the Cornelius Low House, an extant 1741 Georgian mansion, and brought prominence to the community of Raritan Landing. Low's family was descended from German, Dutch and French Huguenot settlers.

== Career ==
Low served as a tax commissioner for the New York provincial government during the French and Indian War. Low was a prominent merchant in New York City, with various firms including Lott & Low. He had large real estate holdings, built up sizable trade, and had interests in a slitting mill. Low was chosen as a delegate to the Stamp Act Congress in 1763. Although he accumulated a fortune that placed him in the upper ranks of colonial New York's merchant leaders, he was "nowhere near its absolute pinnacle."

He was an active speaker against taxation without representation and the chairman of New York City's Committee of Correspondence in 1765. He became chairman of New York City's Committee of Sixty in 1774. Low was named one of nine delegates from New York to the First Continental Congress in 1774 (Note: Low was appointed to the First Continental Congress by the Committee of Fifty-one of the City and County of New York and authorized by the counties of Albany, Duchess, and Westchester.) and to New York Provincial Congress the following year where he pursued a moderate approach towards the British. In 1775, he was a founder and the first president of the New York Chamber of Commerce.

=== American Revolutionary War ===
Opposed to armed conflict with the British Crown, Low quit the Patriot cause after the Declaration of Independence was announced in 1776 and relocated to New Jersey, where he was imprisoned on suspicion of treason by the New Jersey Convention. He was eventually released after George Washington intervened. He later collaborated with British occupation forces in New York, and his property was confiscated after the New York assembly passed a motion of attainder in 1779. Four years later, Low emigrated to England where he died in 1791.

== Personal life ==
Low married Margarita Cuyler (1738–1802) in 1760, a scion of the powerful Schuyler and Van Cortlandt families. Both her father, Cornelis Cuyler, and brother, Abraham Cuyler, were mayors of Albany. Another brother, General Cornelius Cuyler, was a British Army officer during the French Revolutionary Wars, who served as Lt. Gov. of Portsmouth and was created a Baronet of St John's Lodge. Together, Isaac and Margarita were the parents of one child, Isaac Low Jr., who was educated in French and became a British army commissary-general.

Low died in Cowes on the Isle of Wight, Great Britain, on August 25, 1791. Although a family tradition holds that his wife joined him, probate records hold that she died in Albany in 1802.
