= Johannes Jacobse Beekman =

American politician

Mayor of Albany, New York
- In office 1783–1786
- Preceded by: Abraham Ten Broeck
- Succeeded by: John Lansing Jr.

Personal details
- Born: August 8, 1733 Albany, Province of New York, British America
- Died: December 17, 1802 (aged 69) Albany, New York, U.S.
- Spouse: Maria Sanders (m. 1759; died 1794)
- Children: 7

Johannes "John" Jacobse Beekman (August 8, 1733 – December 17, 1802) was a New York politician and businessman of Dutch descent. He served as Mayor of Albany, New York and a member of the New York State Assembly.

== Early life ==
Beekman was born on August 8, 1733. He was the youngest of six children born to Debora (née Hansen) Beekman and Jacob Beekman (1685–1739), an Albany businessman and blacksmith. His sister, Debora Beekman, married Gerrit Staats.

His paternal grandparents were Johannes Beekman, who was married to Machtel (née Schermerhorn) Beekman. His aunt, Maritje "Mary" Beekman, was the wife of Arnout Schermerhorn (grandparents of merchant Peter Schermerhorn and great-grandparents of Abraham Schermerhorn).

== Career ==
Beekman was a successful merchant who was one of the wealthiest Albany landowners. In 1756, he was appointed firemaster. In 1763, he was elected Assistant Alderman in the second ward. After several years as assistant Alderman, he was elected Alderman in September 1775. Beekman also served in the Albany County militia becoming a lieutenant by 1768.

Early in Revolutionary War, Beekman supported the Continental Army and signed the "General Association" in 1776. He represented the second ward as an involved member of the Albany Committee of Correspondence. When Albany government resumed operations in 1778, he was again chosen as Alderman for the Second Ward, serving for several years.

Beekman was elected to represent Albany in the New York State Assembly in 1780 for the 4th New York State Legislature and in 1782 for the 6th New York State Legislature. During his time in the Assembly, he was active in Indian diplomacy. He was appointed mayor of Albany in June 1783, coinciding with the end of the War as Beekman. He served as Mayor until October 1786 when he was succeeded by John Lansing Jr. In 1784, he was a regent of the State University of New York.

== Personal life ==
On November 22, 1759, he married Maria Janse Sanders (1740–1794), the eldest daughter of John Sanders and Debora (née Glen) Sanders of Schenectady. Maria's sister, Margaret, married U.S. Representative Killian K. Van Rensselaer. As Johannes was the only surviving son in his family, he inherited his father's house at 52 North Pearl Street in Albany's second ward. Together, they were the parents of:

- Jacob Beekman (1761–1817), who married Ann McKinney.
- Deborah Beekman (1763–1791), who married John De Peyster Douw, son of Mayor Volkert P. Douw and grandson of Mayor Johannes de Peyster III, in 1787.
- Barent Sanders Beekman (1767–1767), who died young.
- Machtel "Matilda" Beekman (1768–1837), who married Douw Jacob Fonda (1769–1842) in 1794.
- Sarah Beekman (1771–1792), who died unmarried.
- Evje "Effie" Beekman (1774–1792), who died unmarried.
- John Sanders Beekman (1781–1845), who died young.

His wife died on November 2, 1794. Beekman died in Albany on December 17, 1802.

=== Descendants ===
Through his daughter Deborah, he was a grandfather of Volkert Peter Douw (1790–1869).

Civic offices
Preceded by Abraham Ten Broeck	Mayor of Albany, New York; 1783–1786	Succeeded by John Lansing Jr.
