= Cornelis Cuyler =

American politician

Cornelius Cuyler

20th Mayor of Albany, New York
- In office October 14, 1742 – September 28, 1746
- Preceded by: Johannes de Peyster III
- Succeeded by: Dirck Ten Broeck

Personal details
- Born: February 14, 1697 New York City, Province of New York
- Died: April 14, 1765 (aged 68) Albany, Province of New York
- Resting place: Albany Rural Cemetery
- Spouse: Catharina Schuyler (m. 1726; died 1758)
- Relations: Dirck Wesselse Ten Broeck (grandfather); Henry Glen (nephew)
- Children: 11, including Cornelius, Abraham
- Parent(s): Johannes Cuyler; Elsje Ten Broeck

Cornelis Cuyler or Cornelius Cuyler (baptized February 14, 1697 – March 14, 1765) was a prominent American of Dutch ancestry who served as the Mayor of Albany, New York, from 1742 to 1746.

== Early life and family ==
Coat of Arms of Cornelis Cuyler

Cuyler was born in 1697 and baptized in the New York City Dutch Church in the then Province of New York of British America. He was the oldest surviving son of twelve children born to Albany Mayor Johannes Cuyler (1661–1740) and Elsje (née Ten Broeck) Cuyler (d. 1752). His father was an admitted freeman of New York City and served for 22 years as a Commissioner of Indian Affairs. His siblings included Anna Cuyler (who married Anthony Van Schaick), Christina Cuyler, Hendrick Cuyler (who died unmarried), Sara Cuyler (who married Mayor Johannes Hansen), Elsie Cuyler (who married Hendrick Johannes Rosenboom), Johannes Cuyler (who married Catherine Glen, daughter of Johannes Jacob Glen), Maria Cuyler (who married Cornelius Cuyler Ten Broeck, son of Wessel Ten Broeck), and Elizabeth Cuyler (who married Jacob Sanders Glen and were the parents of Henry Glen).

His paternal grandparents were Hendrick Cuyler, a tailor who was born in the Netherlands, came to America, and went to Albany in 1664, and Annatje (née Schepmoes) Cuyler. His maternal grandparents were Albany Mayor Dirck Wesselse Ten Broeck and Christyna (née Van Buren) Ten Broeck.

== Career ==
Following his father, he became a prominent fur trader. In 1717, he served as a constable in the Second Ward. In 1724, he swore not to trade with the French and was, therefore, sent into Mohawk country and Canada to represent Albany's interests.

From 1729 to 1735, he was elected and served as Alderman for the Second Ward. In 1742, Cuyler was appointed and served as the Mayor of Albany, succeeding Johannes de Peyster III who was re-nominated but did not take the oath of allegiance required of officeholders. He served from October 14, 1742, to September 28, 1746, and was himself succeeded by Dirck Ten Broeck.

For a total of fourteen years, he served as Commissioner of Indian Affairs for the Province of New York, appointed in 1734, 1739, 1742, 1745, 1752, and 1754, which brought him into contact with Sir William Johnson, 1st Baronet, both as a client and adversary.

During the French and Indian War, which took place from 1754 to 1763, he was a supplier to the troops.

== Personal life ==
On December 9, 1726, he was married to Catalyntie "Catharina" Schuyler (1704–1758). She was the daughter of Johannes Schuyler (1668–1747), of the prominent Schuyler family, and Elizabeth Staats (1647–1737). She was also the sister of Johannes Schuyler, Jr., making her aunt to Gen. Philip Schuyler, as well as the niece of Pieter and Arent Schuyler. Together, Cornelius and Catharina were the parents of eleven children, including:

- Johannes Cuyler (1729–1749)
- Elizabeth Cuyler (1731–1815), who married Jacobus Van Cortlandt (1726–1781), son of Frederick Van Cortlandt, grandson of Jacobus Van Cortlandt and first cousin of James and John Jay, in 1752.
- Philip Cuyler (b. 1733), who married Sarah Tweedy (1739–1825), of Newport, in 1757. He was also a fur trader.
- Hendrick "Henry" Cuyler (1735–1803), who married Catharina Lydius (1743–1818), daughter of John Henry Lydius (1704–1791), in 1767.
- Elsje "Elsie" Cuyler (1737–1761), who married Augustus Van Cortlandt, another son of Frederick Van Cortlandt, in 1760.
- Margarita Cuyler (1738–1802), who married Isaac Low (1735–1791), a prominent merchant, in 1760.
- Cornelius Cuyler (1740–1819), who married Anne Wendell in 1763, and became the first Baronet of St John's Lodge.
- Abraham Cornelius Cuyler (1742–1810), who married Jannetje "Janet" Glen, who was sister to Henry Glen (1739–1814), in 1764.

Cuyler died on March 14, 1765, in Albany. He was buried in Church cemetery but later moved to Albany Rural Cemetery.

=== Descendants ===
Though his son Cornelius, he was the grandfather of Sir Charles Cuyler, 2nd Baronet (1794–1862).

Through his son Abraham, he was the grandfather of Jacob Glen Cuyler (1773–1854), who became a British army officer who was instrumental getting the 1820 Settlers to South Africa.

Political offices
Preceded by Johannes de Peyster III	Mayor of Albany, New York; 1742–1746	Succeeded by Dirck Ten Broeck
