= Johannes Cuyler =

American merchant

Mayor of Albany, New York
- In office 1725–1726
- Preceded by: Myndert Schuyler
- Succeeded by: Rutger Jansen Bleecker

Member of the New York General Assembly
- In office 1705–1727

Recorder of Albany, New York
- In office 1710–1710

Personal details
- Born: c. 1661; New Amsterdam, Province of New York
- Died: July 20, 1740 (aged 78); Albany, Province of New York
- Spouse: Elsje Ten Broeck (m. 1684)
- Children: 12, including Cornelis
- Relatives: Cornelius Cuyler (grandson); Abraham Cuyler (grandson); John Cruger Jr. (nephew)

Johannes Cuyler (1661 – July 20, 1740) was a prominent American merchant of Dutch ancestry who served as the Mayor of Albany, New York, from 1725 to 1726.

== Early life and family ==
Coat of Arms of Johannes Cuyler

Cuyler was born in 1661 in New Amsterdam in the Province of New Netherland, which in 1664 became the Province of New York. He was the eldest son of Hendrick Cuyler (1637–1690), and Annatje (née Schepmoes) Cuyler (1642–1703). His father was a tailor who was born in the Netherlands, came to America, and went to Albany in 1664 after the expansion of British America. His siblings included Abraham Cuyler (d. 1747), who married Caatje Bleecker (1670–1734), Maria Cuyler (d. 1724), who married New York Mayor John Cruger (1678–1744), Sarah Hendrickse Cuyler (1666–1742), who married Albany Mayor Pieter Van Brugh (1666–1740) (the son of Johannes Pieterse van Brugh), and Henry Cuyler (1677–1763), who married Maria Jacobs.

His paternal grandparents, who stayed in the Netherlands, were Isebrant Cuyler and Evertien Jansz. His father was a supporter of Jacob Leisler and his mother was born in Albany, New York, to Dutch immigrants. Through his sister Maria, he was the uncle of John Cruger Jr. (1710–1791), also Mayor of New York and Provincial Assembly Speaker. Through his sister Sarah, he was the uncle of Catharina Van Brugh (b. 1689) who married Philip Livingston (1686–1749), second lord of Livingston Manor.

== Career ==
Cuyler, a merchant in the fur trade, became an admitted freeman of New York City. Before the establishment of Albany's government in 1686, Cuyler had already been a witness, plaintiff, and an attorney at the Albany court. In 1687, he was elected assistant Alderman for the Second Ward and, thus, he began his long association with Albany's government. He was an assistant Alderman until 1698 when he was elected Alderman and served in that role until 1710.

While serving on the city council, his main areas of focus included improving relations with the Native Americans and ensuring the ongoing progress of real estate development within the city and its surrounding areas. In 1710, he was appointed as the Recorder (Deputy Mayor) of Albany. In 1705, he was elected to represent Albany in the New York General Assembly. Notwithstanding two brief breaks, he was elected to five terms, serving from 1705 to 1727.

In 1725, he was appointed Mayor of Albany, succeeding Myndert Schuyler. He served for a year until 1726 when Rutger Bleecker replaced him. For a total of twenty-two years, he served as a Commissioner of Indian Affairs for the Province of New York, appointed in 1706, 1710, 1715, 1720, 1724, 1726, 1728, and 1732.

== Personal life ==
On November 2, 1684, he was married to Elsje Ten Broeck (d. 1752). She was the daughter of Albany Mayor Dirck Wesselse Ten Broeck (1638–1717) and Christyna (née Van Buren) Ten Broeck (1644–1729). Together, Johannes and Elsje were the parents of twelve children, including:

- Anna Cuyler (1685–1741), who married Anthony Van Schaick (1682–1759).
- Christina Cuyler (1689–1755)
- Hendrick Cuyler (1692–1724), who died unmarried.
- Sara Cuyler (b. 1693), who married Mayor Johannes Hansen (1695–1756).
- Elsie Cuyler (1695–1752), who married Hendrick Johannes Rosenboom (1689–1754).
- Cornelis Cuyler (1697–1765), who married Catalyntie "Catharina" Schuyler (1704–1758). She was the daughter of Johannes Schuyler (1668–1747), of the prominent Schuyler family, and Elizabeth Staats (1647–1737). She was also the sister of Johannes Schuyler, Jr., making her aunt to Gen. Philip Schuyler, as well as the niece of Pieter and Arent Schuyler.
- Johannes Cuyler (1699–1746), who married Catherine Glen (b. 1699), daughter of Johannes Jacob Glen.
- Maria Cuyler (1702–1788), who married Cornelius Cuyler Ten Broeck (1706–1772), son of Wessel Ten Broeck.
- Elizabeth Cuylter (b. 1705), who married Jacob Sanders Glen (1703–1746) and were the parents of Henry Glen.

Cuyler died on July 20, 1740, in Albany.

=== Descendants ===
Through his son Cornelis, he was the grandfather of Elizabeth Cuyler (1731–1815), who married Jacobus Van Cortlandt (1726–1781), grandson of Jacobus Van Cortlandt, Philip Cuyler (b. 1733), who married Sarah Tweedy (1739–1825), Hendrick "Henry" Cuyler (1735–1803), who married Catharina Lydius (1743–1818), Elsje "Elsie" Cuyler (1737–1761), who married Augustus Van Cortlandt (1728–1823), another grandson of Jacobus Van Cortlandt, Margarita Cuyler (1738–1802), who married Isaac Low (1735–1791), a prominent merchant, Cornelius Cuyler (1740–1819), who married Anne Wendell in 1763, and became the first Baronet of St John's Lodge, and Abraham Cornelius Cuyler (1742–1810), who married Jannetje "Janet" Glen, who was sister to Henry Glen (1739–1814), in 1764.

Through his son Johannes, he was the grandfather of Jacob Cuyler (1741–1804), a prominent silversmith who participated in the Albany Committee of Correspondence, served as a delegate from Albany to the New York Provincial Congress, and was a member of the Sons of Liberty.

Political offices
Preceded by Myndert Schuyler	Mayor of Albany, New York; 1725–1726	Succeeded by Rutger Bleecker
