= Volkert P. Douw =

American politician (1720–1801)

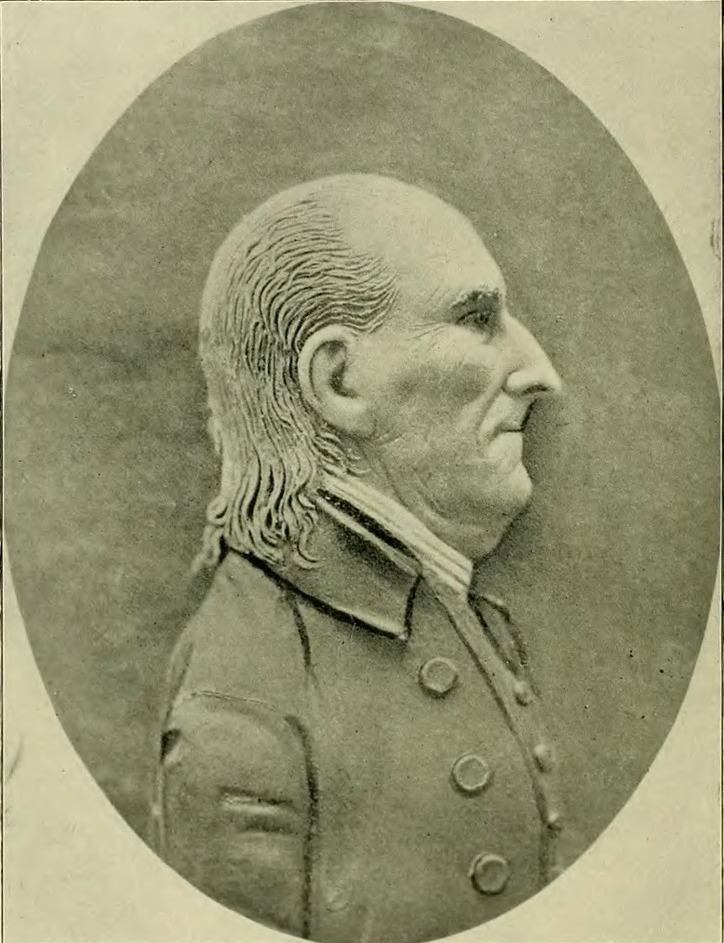

Member of the New York State Senate
- In office July 1, 1785 – June 30, 1793
- Preceded by: William B. Whiting
- Succeeded by: Jacobus Van Schoonhoven

Member of the New York General Assembly
- In office 1761–1780s

Mayor of Albany, New York
- In office 1761–1770
- Governor: Cadwallader Colden; Sir Henry Moore, Bt.
- Preceded by: Sybrant Gozen Van Schaick
- Succeeded by: Abraham Cuyler

Recorder of Albany, New York
- In office 1750–1760
- Preceded by: John G. Roseboom
- Succeeded by: John Ten Eyck

Personal details
- Born: Volkert Petrus Douw; March 23, 1720 Albany, Province of New York, British America
- Died: March 20, 1801 (aged 80) Albany, New York, U.S.
- Resting place: Albany Rural Cemetery
- Spouse: Anna De Peyster (m. 1742; died 1794)
- Children: 9
- Relatives: Peter Gansevoort (nephew); Leonard Gansevoort (nephew); Hendrick van Rensselaer (grandfather)

Volkert Petrus Douw (March 23, 1720 – March 20, 1801) was a merchant and politician from Albany, New York, who was prominent both during colonial times and after the United States was established.

== Early life ==
Douw was born on March 23, 1720, in Albany, New York. He was the only surviving son of nine children born to Petrus Douw (1692–1775), of an old Dutch family, and Anna (née Van Rensselaer) Douw (1696–1756). His siblings included Magdalena Douw (1718–1796), who married Harmen Gansevoort (1712–1801), Maria Douw (1725–1759), who married Johannes Gansevoort, and Rachel Douw (1736–1806).

His maternal grandparents were Hendrick van Rensselaer (1667–1740), director of Fort Crailo, the Eastern patent of the Rensselaerswyck manor, and Catharina Van Brugh, herself the daughter of merchant Johannes Pieterse Van Brugh (1624–1697) and sister of Pieter Van Brugh (1666–1740), mayor of Albany from 1699 to 1700 and again from 1721 to 1723. Through his sister Maria, he was uncle to Brig. Gen. Peter Gansevoort (1749–1812) and State Senator and Assemblymen Leonard Gansevoort (1751–1810).

== Career ==
He worked as a skipper on the Hudson River but eventually returned to Albany to run the family store. During the Seven Years' War, or the French and Indian War as it was known in the colonies, which took place from 1754 to 1763, he was a Captain of the Colonial Militia and the first Judge of Albany County Court, serving from 1757 to 1775. From 1750 to 1760, he was City Recorder (Deputy Mayor) of Albany. In 1760, Douw was appointed as mayor of Albany, New York, serving from 1761 to 1770, following Sybrant Gozen Van Schaick. He was succeeded by Abraham Cuyler. From 1761 until the 1780s, he was a member of the Colonial General Assembly of New York.

In 1774, and again in 1775, he served as Commissioner of Indian Affairs in for the Province of New York. During the first New York Provincial Congress, which was convened in New York City on May 22, 1775, Douw served as vice-president with Peter Van Brugh Livingston as president. During the American Revolution, he was a member of the Albany Committee of Correspondence.

Following the establishment of New York State, Douw served in the new government as a member of the New York State Senate, beginning on July 1, 1785, serving in the 9th, 10th, 11th, 12th, 13th, 14th, 15th, and 16th New York State Legislatures. He retired from the Senate on June 30, 1793, after representing one of five seats for the Western District which consisted of Albany, Montgomery, Herkimer, Ontario, Otsego, Saratoga and Tioga counties. Following Virginia's Ratifying Convention in June 1788, where they became the tenth state to ratify the United States Constitution, New York held their Convention held in Poughkeepsie, New York, in July 1788 presided by Gov. George Clinton. Despite Douw's vote against ratification, New York became the eleventh state to ratify on July 26, 1788. By 1790, his household owned 14 slaves.

== Personal life ==
On May 20, 1742, Douw was married to Anna De Peyster (1723–1794), the daughter of Johannes de Peyster III (1694–1783), who also served as mayor of Albany. They built a home in the country known as Wolvenhook, located on the eastern bank of the Hudson River, about a mile below Albany. Together, they were the parents of nine children, including:

- Anna Douw (1743–1774), who married Dirck Ten Broeck (1738–1780), son of Mayor Dirck Ten Broeck, in 1761.
- Rachel Douw (1745–1799), who married Henry I. Van Renssselaer (1742–1813), son of Johannes Van Rensselaer and Angelica Livingston, in 1765.
- Myndert Schuyler Douw (1746–1747), who died young.
- Magdalena Douw (1750–1817), who married John Stevenson (1734–1810), a wealthy loyalist merchant, in 1770.
- Catrina Douw (1751–1775), who married Harmanis Hoffman.
- Johannes "John" De Peyster Douw (1756–1835), who married three times; first to Deborah Beeckman (1763–1791), daughter of Mayor Johannes Jacobse Beeckman, in 1787, then to Margaret Livingston (1768–1802), daughter of Col. Peter Robert Livingston (1737–1794) and granddaughter of Robert Livingston, 3rd Lord of Livingston Manor, in 1795, and lastly to Catherine Douw Gansevoort (1782–1848), daughter of Leonard Gansevoort Jr. and Maria Van Rensselaer (1760–1841), in 1811.
- Maria Douw (1760–1818), who married her cousin, John De Peyster Ten Eyck (1756–1798), the son of Tobias Coenraedt Ten Eyck, in 1782.

He was a lifelong friend of General Philip Schuyler, and after his death it was said of him that he was "a true patriot; in civil and domestic relations, he was considered a pattern, and no man in Albany died more regretted." He was described as:

He was tall and dignified, standing six feet two inches, as straight as an arrow; said by some to be handsome. He had a clean-shaven face, exposing a firm mouth and piercing eyes. He wore his hair in peculiar fashion, probably common to others of his standing in those times, tied in a queue, with his front hair brushed back in severe lines and powdered. He usually wore a longwaisted coat, the skirts reaching nearly to his ankles, which was adorned with large silver buttons made from Spanish coins. Knee breeches, silk stockings, and shoes with silver buckles shining, these set with rhinestones, heightened the general effect; but more prominent than these was his cocked hat. He carried a silver-headed cane, and bore a turnipshaped, silver watch, from which hung a heavy seal, while his tobacco or snuff-box was engraved with initials and coat-of-arms.

Douw died on March 20, 1801, in Albany. He was buried at the Albany Rural Cemetery.

=== Descendants ===
Through his son John, who was close friends with the Marquis de Lafayette, he was the grandfather of Volckert Peter Douw (1790–1869), Anna De Peyster Douw Cuyler (1798–1871), Margaret Livingston Douw Abbe (1798–1878), John De Peyster Douw (1812–1901), Catharine Louisa Douw Townsend (1817–1891), and Harriet Maria Douw Johnson (1824–1852).

Through his daughter Magdalena, he was the grandfather of James Stevenson (1788–1852), who also served as mayor of Albany from 1826 to 1828.

== See also ==
- Van Rensselaer family

Civic offices
Preceded by Sybrant Gozen Van Schaick	Mayor of Albany, New York; 1761–1770	Succeeded by Abraham Cuyler
