= Dirck Ten Broeck =

American politician (1765–1832)

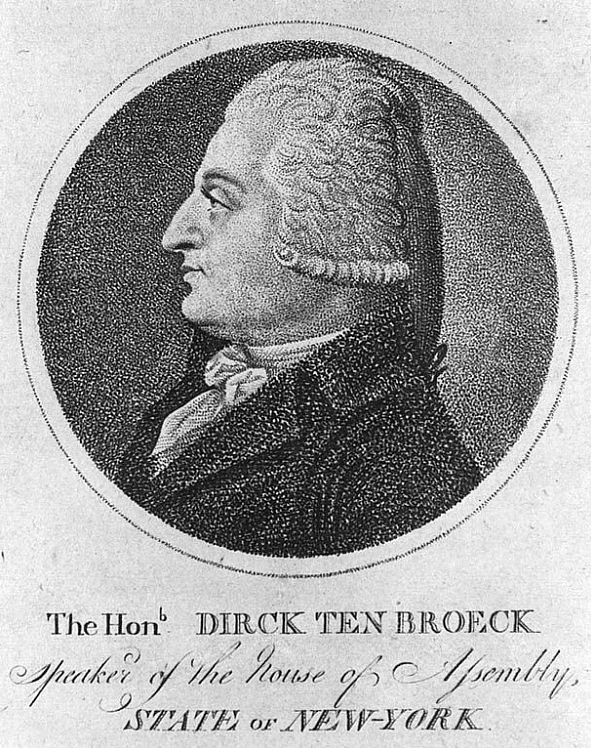

Speaker of the New York State Assembly
- In office 1798–1800
- Preceded by: Gulian Verplanck
- Succeeded by: Samuel Osgood

Member of the New York State Assembly
- In office 1796–1802

Personal details
- Born: November 3, 1765 Albany, Province of New York, British America
- Died: January 30, 1833 (aged 67) North Castle, New York, U.S.
- Party: Federalist
- Spouse: Cornelia Stuyvesant (m. 1785; died 1825)
- Parent(s): Abraham Ten Broeck; Elizabeth Van Rensselaer
- Relatives: Dirck Ten Broeck (grandfather); Stephen Van Rensselaer I (grandfather)

Dirck Ten Broeck (November 3, 1765 – January 30, 1833) was an American lawyer and politician. The first name is sometimes given as Derick.

== Early life ==
He was the only son of Abraham Ten Broeck (1734–1810) and Elizabeth (née Van Rensselaer) Ten Broeck (1734–1813). His twin sister died before her second birthday. His father served as Mayor of Albany from 1779 to 1783, and again from 1796 to 1798. His younger sister, Elizabeth Ten Broeck (1772–1848), was married Rensselaer Schuyler (1773–1847), a son of Philip Schuyler and Catherine Van Rensselaer, making her a sister-in-law to Angelica Schuyler Church, Elizabeth Schuyler Hamilton, Peggy Schuyler Van Rensselaer, and U.S. Representative Philip Jeremiah Schuyler.

His maternal grandfather was Stephen Van Rensselaer I (the 7th Patroon and 4th Lord of the Manor of Rensselaerswyck) and his uncle was Stephen Van Rensselaer II. His mother and uncle were great-grandchildren of the first native-born Mayor of New York City, Stephanus Van Cortlandt. His paternal grandfather was Dirck Ten Broeck (1686–1751), who also served as Mayor of Albany from 1746 to 1748. His father's sister, his aunt Christina Ten Broeck (1718–1801) was married to Continental Congressman and signor of the Declaration of Independence Philip Livingston (1716–1778).

== Career ==
Ten Broeck was a Lieutenant colonel in the 1st Regiment of the City of Albany.

He studied law, and was admitted to the bar in 1791. He served on the Albany City Council in 1793.

He was a Federalist member representing Albany in the New York State Assembly from 1796 to 1802, and was Speaker of the Assembly from 1798 to 1800 when John Jay was Governor of New York.

== Personal life ==
On September 6, 1785, at the age of twenty, he married Cornelia Stuyvesant (d. 1825) at the New York City Dutch Church. She was a daughter of Petrus Stuyvesant (1727–1805) and Margaret (née Livingston) Stuyvesant (1738–1818) and a sister of Peter Gerard Stuyvesant. Her father was a great-grandson of Peter Stuyvesant, the last Dutch governor of New Netherlands. For their wedding, he gave Cornelia a bracelet made by John Ramage featuring a watercolor painting of cupid. Together, they had twelve children who were baptized in Albany and several more babies that were stillborn. Their baptized children were:

- Abraham Stuyvesant Ten Broeck (1788–1810), who died unmarried.
- Margaret Stuyvesant Ten Broeck (1790–1873), who married Rev. Robert Gibson (1792–1829), son of Robert Gibson of Charleston, S.C., on June 11, 1818. Gibson founded the Edgehill School in Princeton.
- Petrus Stuyvesant Ten Broeck (1792–1849), a priest who married Lucretia Loring Cutter (1792–1861), daughter of Mayor Levi Cutter.
- Stephen Van Rensselaer Ten Broeck (1793–1793), who died young.
- Dirck Ten Broeck (1794–1794), who also died young.
- Elizabeth Maria Ten Broeck (1795–1795), who also died young.
- Cornelia Ten Broeck (1798–1798), who also died young.
- Dirck Wessels Ten Broeck (1800–1800), who also died young.
- Stephan Philip Van Rensselaer Ten Broeck (1802–1866), a physician who married Mary Nielson, daughter of William Nielson.
- Nicholas William Ten Broeck (1805–1805), who also died young.
- Elizabeth Ten Broeck (1810–1810), who also died young.
- Elizabeth Van Rensselaer Ten Broeck (1813–1813), who also died young.

Ten Broeck died in North Castle in Westchester County, on January 30, 1833.

=== Descendants ===
Through his daughter Margaret, he was the grandfather of Dr. Robert Phillips Gibson (1819–1890), who married Susan Moser (1822–1902) in 1845. They were the parents of many children, including Susan Meta Gibson, an artist, and Henry Pierson Gibson (1856–1921), who was buried at the Ten Broeck vault in St. Mark's Churchyard.

Through his son Petrus, he was the grandfather of Cornelia Stuyvesant Ten Broeck (1820–1892) who married George Edwin Bartol Jackson (1829–1891), a lawyer from Portland, Maine. on May 30, 1853. They were the parents of Margaret Stuyvesant (née Jackson) White (1855-1939), Elizabeth Deblois (née Jackson) Merrill (1857-1933), Stuyvesant Ten Broeck Jackson (1860–1940).

Political offices
Preceded by Gulian Verplanck	Speaker of the New York State Assembly; 1798–1800	Succeeded by Samuel Osgood
