= Henry Glen =

American politician (1739–1814)

Member of the U.S. House of Representatives from New York's 7th district
- In office March 4, 1793 – March 3, 1801
- Preceded by: New District
- Succeeded by: Killian K. Van Rensselaer

Personal details
- Born: July 13, 1739 Albany, Province of New York, British America
- Died: January 6, 1814 (aged 74) Schenectady, New York, U.S.
- Citizenship: United States
- Party: Federalist
- Spouse: Elizabeth (Elisabet) Vischer
- Children: 6
- Profession: Merchant; Land speculator

Henry Glen (July 13, 1739 – January 6, 1814) was a merchant, military officer and politician who served as a Federalist in the United States House of Representatives during the years immediately following the adoption of the United States Constitution.

== Early life ==
Henry Glen was born in Albany in the Province of New York on July 13, 1739, to Jacob Glen and Elizabeth Cuyler. His sister, Janet (Jannetje), was the wife of Abraham Cuyler, who was the Mayor of Albany from 1770 until 1776 when he was banished for Tory leanings and settled in Canada. His brothers included Johannes (John) Glen and Jacobus (Jacob) Teller Glen. Glens Falls was named for Johannes, and Glenville was named for their ancestor, Sander Leendertse Glen, also known as Alexander Lindsay Glen.

Henry's middle name was Jacob, and his names in Dutch were "Hendrick" (the Dutch version of Henry) and "Jacobse" or "Jacobus." He grew up in the Dutch culture of Albany and Schenectady, and his name often appears in records in English, in Dutch, or in a combination of both languages. In addition, his name is sometimes recorded with his middle name, without his middle name, and with spelling variants, including "Hendrik" and "Hendrick." His last name also sometimes appears in written records as "Glenn."

== Career ==
=== Early career ===
Glen became a merchant and was successful in the Indian Trade and land speculation, operating a company in partnership with his brother Johannes and Jacobus Teller. He was an early white settler of Schenectady, and was appointed Town Clerk in 1767. He held this post until 1809. Glen was a slaveowner; according to the 1790 U.S. Census, he owned seven. In 1800, the U.S. Census recorded Glen as possessing five slaves. According to the 1810 Census, he owned none.

In the 1760s, Glen was appointed a second lieutenant in his brother's militia company.

=== American Revolution ===
At the start of the American Revolution, Glen was appointed commander of the 2nd Company of Schenectady Militia, with the rank of captain. Glen also served as a member of Schenectady's Committee of Safety. In addition, he was elected to the New York Provincial Congress.

Glen was later appointed a Continental Army Assistant Deputy Quartermaster General with the rank of major. He then advanced to deputy quartermaster general, and attained the rank of colonel. Quartermasters were responsible for procuring food, horses, wagons, weapons, ammunition, uniforms, tents and other materiel and arranging for them to be distributed to the Infantry, Cavalry and Artillery units.

During the Revolution, Glen also served as one of New York's three Commissioners of Indian Affairs, and was one of the commission's executive agents. The Commissioners of Indian Affairs were responsible for negotiating with the nations of upstate New York in an effort to end their support for the British, and possibly begin to support the Patriot cause.

=== Post-American Revolution ===
After the Revolution, Glen resumed his Schenectady business interests. An early supporter of what became the Federalist Party, he served in the New York State Assembly from 1786 to 1787.

In 1792, he was a successful candidate for election to the United States House of Representatives. He served four terms, beginning with the Third and through the Sixth Congresses, serving from March 4, 1793, to March 3, 1801. He was not a candidate for reelection in 1800, and was succeeded by Killian K. Van Rensselaer.

In 1810, Glen returned to the New York Assembly and served one term.

== Personal life ==
In 1762, Henry Glen married Elizabeth (Elisabet) Vischer. Their children included:

- Elisabeth Glen, who married Willem Van Ingen
- Catarina Glen, who married Rev. Jacob Sickles
- Jannetje Glen
- Jacob Glen
- Johannes Glen
- Cornelius Glen

Glen died in Schenectady on January 6, 1814. He is presumed to have originally been interred in Schenectady's First Dutch Churchyard. The remains at this site were later moved to Vale Cemetery, presumably including Glen's. Not all the gravestones from Schenectady's first cemeteries were transported to Vale Cemetery, so the exact location of his grave is not known.

U.S. House of Representatives
New district	Member of the U.S. House of Representatives from New York's 8th congressional district 1793 – 1801	Succeeded by Killian K. Van Rensselaer
