= Commissioners for Indian Affairs =

The Commissioners for Indian Affairs were a group of officials of colonial Albany, New York charged with regulating the fur trade and dealing with the Iroquois.

== History ==
Originally the local magistrates, functioning informally, performed these tasks as part of their official duties. In 1685, Governor Andros organized a board of commissioners, the same officials who had previously performed those duties.

This system was affirmed by charter granted to the City of Albany by Governor Thomas Dongan in 1686. In 1696, Governor Benjamin Fletcher appointed an independent board of four members to take over from the magistrates: Pieter Schuyler, Dirck Wesselse Ten Broeck, Domine Godfrey Dellius, and Evert Bancker. In 1698, Governor Bellomont dissolved the independent group and restored the functions to the city government. After this, however, the commissioners received a special commission from the governor. During King George's War (1744–1748), Governor Clinton preempted the authority of the Commissioners and appointed Sir William Johnson to deal with the Iroquois.

The Commissioners were headed by the Secretary for Indian Affairs. Until 1686, the office of Secretary was filled the Secretary of the Manor of Rensselaerswyck. Robert Livingston was appointed to this post in 1675. Robert Livingston the Younger took over from his uncle in 1710, followed by Philip Livingston from 1725 to 1749. Peter Wraxall was secretary from 1750 to 1759. Witham Marshe was secretary from 1759.

During the American Revolution the British Government took over management of Indian affairs from the colonists, and the commissioners ceased to function.

== List of commissioners ==
No.	Named individual	Birth year	Death year	Total service (years)	Dates of commissions
1	Evert Bancker	1665	1734	20	1696, 1706, 1710, 1720, 1724, 1726, 1728, 1729, 1732
2	John Beeckman			3	1752, 1754
3	Hendrick Bleecker			2	1752
4	Johannes Bleecker Jr.	1668	1738	4	1720
5	Nicholas Bleecker			14	1728, 1729, 1732, 1734, 1742, 1745
6	Rutger Bleecker	1675	1756	17	1728, 1729, 1732, 1734, 1739, 1742, 1745
7	Arent Bradt			3	1739
8	Edward Clarke			1	1738
9	Edward Collins	1704	1753	11	1734, 1739, 1742, 1745
10	John Collins	1670	1728	8	1720, 1724, 1726
11	Capt. Cornwell			2	1726
12	Abraham Cuyler	1663	1747	14	1728, 1729, 1732, 1734, 1742, 1745
13	Cornelis Cuyler	1697	1765	14	1734, 1739, 1742, 1745, 1752, 1754
14	Johannes Cuyler	1661	1740	22	1706, 1710, 1715, 1720, 1724, 1726, 1728, 1732
15	Johannes De Peyster III			11	1734, 1739, 1742, 1742, 1745
16	William Dick			4	1734
17	Ryer Gerritse	1675	1752	10	1728, 1729, 1732, 1742, 1745
18	Jacob Glen			7	1734, 1739
19	Peter Groenendyck			2	1752
20	Stephanus Groesbeck	1662	1744	17	1728, 1729, 1732, 1734, 1739, 1742, 1745
21	Hendrick Hansen	1665	1724	14	1710, 1712, 1715, 1720
22	Johannes Hansen	1695	1756	2	1754
23	Edward Holland	1702	1756	6	1734, 1738, 1739
24	Henry Holland	1661	1736	16	1706, 1720, 1724, 1728, 1729, 1732
25	Johannes Lansing			4	1728, 1729
26	John Lansing Jr.	1687	1742	14	1734, 1739, 1742, 1745, 1752
27	John Lindsey		1751	1	1738
28	Philip Livingston			23	1720, 1724, 1726, 1728, 1729, 1732, 1734, 1738, 1742, 1745
29	Capt. Norris			2	1726
30	John Rennselaer			2	1754
31	Johannes Roseboom	1661	1745	8	1710. 1728, 1729, 1732
32	John Rutherford			4	1742, 1745
33	Barent Sanders	1678	1757	6	1728, 1729, 1732
34	Robert Sanders	1705	1765	2	1752
35	Johannes Schuyler	1668	1747	16	1715, 1729, 1734, 1739
36	Johannes Schuyler Jr.	1697	1746	8	1734, 1739
37	Myndert Schuyler	1672	1755	35	1706, 1710, 1712, 1715, 1728, 1729, 1732, 1734, 1739, 1742, 1745, 1752, 1754
38	Peter Schuyler	1657	1724	20	1691, 1696, 1706, 1715, 1720
39	Philip Schuyler	1695	1745	10	1728, 1729, 1732, 1734
40	Dirck Ten Broeck	1686	1751	16	1729, 1732, 1734, 1738, 1739, 1742, 1745
41	Hendrick Ten Eyck			7	1739, 1742, 1745
42	Jacob Coenraedt Ten Eyck	1705	1793	3	1752, 1754
43	Pieter Van Brugh	1666	1740	28	1706, 1710, 1712, 1715, 1720, 1724, 1726, 1728, 1729, 1732
44	David Van Duyck			2	1724
45	Hendrick van Rensselaer	1667	1740	17	1706, 1724, 1726, 1729, 1732, 1734
46	Jeremiah Van Rensselaer			13	1728, 1729, 1732, 1734, 1734
47	Stephen Van Rensselaer II			2	1745
48	Sybrant G. Van Schaick	1708	1774	3	1752, 1754
49	Evert Wendell			8	1724, 1728, 1728, 1732
50	Hermanus Wendell			6	1728, 1729, 1732
51	Johannes Wendell			6	1720, 1724
52	Pieter Winne	1690	1759	4	1739, 1754
53	Albany Commandant			6	1738, 1739, 1752
54	Assembly member for Albany			3	1738, 1752
55	Assembly member for Livingston Manor			2	1752
56	Assembly member for Rensselaerswyck			3	1738, 1752
57	Assembly member for Schenectady			3	1738, 1752
58	New York councillors			5	1739, 1752

== See also ==
- Bureau of Indian Affairs
