= Philip Livingston =

American Founding Father, merchant, and politician (1716–1778)

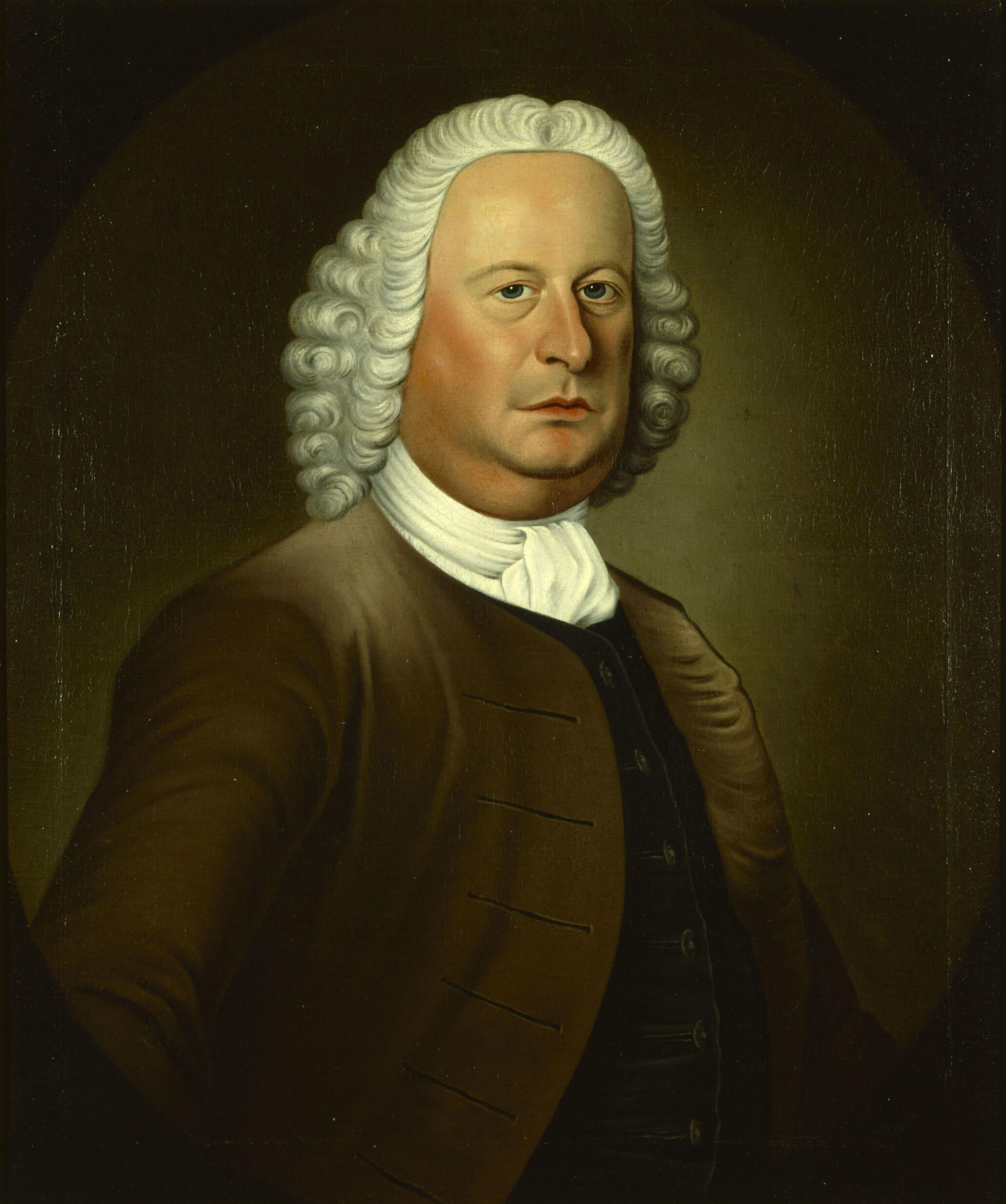
- Portrait attributed to Thomas McIlworth, c. 1764

Member of the New York State Senate
- In office September 9, 1777 – June 12, 1778
- Preceded by: Created
- Succeeded by: James Jay

Personal details
- Born: January 15, 1716 Albany, New York, British America
- Died: June 12, 1778 (aged 62) York, Pennsylvania, U.S.
- Spouse: Christina Ten Broeck (m. 1740)
- Children: 9
- Parent(s): Philip Livingston; Catherine Van Brugh
- Relatives: See Livingston family
- Education: Yale College
- Occupation: Merchant, politician
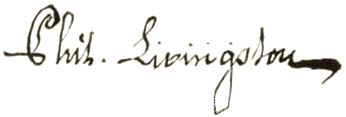
- Signature

Philip Livingston (January 15, 1716 – June 12, 1778) was an American Founding Father, merchant, politician, and slave trader from New York City. He represented New York at the October 1774 First Continental Congress, where he favored imposing economic sanctions upon Great Britain as a way of pressuring the British Parliament to repeal the Intolerable Acts. Livingston was also a delegate to the Second Continental Congress from 1775 to 1778, and signed the Declaration of Independence.

== Early life and education ==
Livingston was born in Albany, New York, on January 15, 1716, the fourth surviving son of Philip Livingston (1686–1749), 2nd Lord of the Manor, and Catherine Van Brugh Livingston, the daughter of New York Mayor Pieter Van Brugh. Along with his brother, William Livingston (1723–1790), he grew up in the Albany area, dividing his time between his father's Albany townhouse and the manor house in Linlithgo, at the junction of the Roeliff Jansen Kill and the Hudson River.

Livingston graduated from Yale College in 1737.

== Career ==
=== Mercantile career ===
Following graduation, he returned to Albany to undergo a mercantile apprenticeship under his father. Through his father's influence, he obtained clerkships in Albany's municipal government. Livingston subsequently moved to New York City and pursued a career in the import business, trading with the British West Indies. During King George's War, Livingston made a fortune provisioning British forces and engaging in privateering. He also speculated heavily in real estate and the slave trade, financing at least fifteen slave-trading voyages, which transported hundreds of enslaved Africans to New York.

He purchased a stone townhouse on Duke Street, Manhattan, a forty-acre estate in Brooklyn Heights and personally owned several slaves, one of whom ran away in November 1752; Livingston published advertisements in several city newspapers, including the New-York Mercury and New-York Gazette, offering a reward for his recapture. He also served as an alderman of the East Ward from 1754 to 1762.

Livingston also became involved in the establishment of King's College and helped to organize the New York Society Library in 1754. In 1756 he was president and founding member of the St. Andrew's Society, New York's first benevolent organization, and he founded New York City's first chamber of commerce in 1768. Livingston was also one of the first governors of New York Hospital.

=== Politics ===
In 1754, Livingston was a delegate to the Albany Congress. There, he joined delegates from several other colonies to negotiate with Indigenous nations and discuss common plans for dealing with the French and Indian War. Livingston became an active promoter of efforts to raise and fund troops for the war. According to Cynthia A. Kiemer, he owned shares in six privateers, making him one of the colony's leading investors.

He served as a member of the provincial house of representatives from 1763 to 1769 and in 1768 served as speaker. In October 1765, he attended the Stamp Act Congress, which produced the first formal protest to the Crown as a prelude to the American Revolution. He joined New York City's Committee of Correspondence to continue communication with leaders in the other colonies, and New York City's Committee of Sixty. When New York established the New York Provincial Congress in 1775, he was named its president.

He was selected as one of the delegates to the Continental Congress. His brother William, a prominent lawyer in New Jersey, was also a delegate to the Continental Congress from 1774 to June 1776. In July 1775, Philip signed the Olive Branch Petition, a final attempt to achieve an understanding with the Crown.

When the British occupied New York City, Philip and his family fled to Kingston, New York, where he maintained another residence. During this time, his abandoned slaves "may have sought their freedom in enemy-occupied Manhattan, where the British offered freedom to any black Americans willing to aid them in stamping down the American 'rebellion.'" After the Battle of Long Island, General George Washington and his officers met at Philip's residence in Brooklyn Heights and decided to evacuate the island. The British subsequently used Philip's Duke Street home as a barracks and his Brooklyn Heights residence as a Royal Navy hospital.

After the adoption of the new New York State Constitution, he was appointed to the New York State Senate southern district in 1777, while continuing to sit in the Continental Congress. Livingston suffered from dropsy, and his health deteriorated in 1778.

== Personal life ==
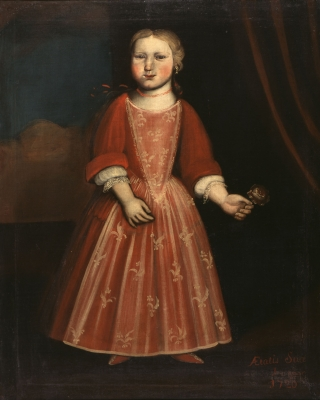
Christina Ten Broeck in a childhood oil portrait by Nehemiah Partridge

On April 14, 1740, he married Christina Ten Broeck (1718–1801), daughter of Dirck Ten Broeck (1686–1751) and Margarita Cuyler (1682–1783). Christina was the sister of Albany Mayor Abraham Ten Broeck and the great-granddaughter of Albany Mayor Dirck Wesselse Ten Broeck (1638–1717), through her maternal grandfather, Wessel Ten Broeck (1664–1747). Together, Philip and Christina had nine children:

- Philip Philip Livingston (1741–1787), who married Sara Johnson (1749–1802)
- Dirck "Richard" Livingston (b. 1743), who died unmarried.
- Catherine Livingston (1745–1810), who married Stephen van Rensselaer II (1742–1769) in 1764. After his death, she married Eilardus Westerlo (1738–1790) in 1775.
- Margaret Livingston (1747–1830), who married Dr. Thomas Jones (1733–1794) of New York.
- Peter Van Brugh Livingston (b. 1751), who died unmarried.
- Sarah Livingston (1752–1814), who married Rev. John Henry Livingston (1746–1825), her second cousin.
- John Abraham Livingston (1754–1782), who served as commissary to the Continental Army during the Revolutionary War and who died unmarried in Charleston, South Carolina.
- Alida Livingston (b. 1757), who died unmarried.
- Henry Philip Livingston (b. 1760), a captain in General Washington's Life Guard, who died unmarried.

=== Death ===
On June 12, 1778, Livingston died suddenly while attending the sixth session of Congress in York, Pennsylvania, and is buried in the Prospect Hill Cemetery there. Livingston was a Presbyterian and a Mason. When Livingston died, his estate was insufficient to meet his debts, and his executors renounced the administration of the estate. On February 25, 1785, the New York Legislature passed an act, entitled An Act for vesting the Estate of Philip Livingston, late of the City of New-York, Esquire, deceased, in Trustees for the Payment of his Debts, and other Purposes therein mentioned, which named as trustees his son and heir, Philip Philip Livingston, Isaac Roosevelt, and Robert C. Livingston, his nephew who was a son of Robert Livingston, 3rd Lord of the Manor. The trustees were responsible for administering Livingston's "property, pay all debts, and discharge the pecuniary legacies." After his son's death in 1788, Rev. John Henry Livingston, Thomas Jones, both his sons-in-law, Henry Brockholst Livingston, his nephew, and Alexander Hamilton were appointed the executors of his will.

=== Descendants ===
Through his son Philip, the only of his sons to have children, he was the grandfather of Philip Henry Livingston (1769–1831) and Edward Philip Livingston (1779–1843), the Lieutenant Governor of New York. Through Philip Henry, he was the great-grandfather of Edward Livingston (1796–1840), Speaker of the New York State Assembly. His granddaughter, Christina Livingston, married John Navarre Macomb (1774–1810), the son of Alexander Macomb (1748–1831) and brother of Maj. Gen. Alexander Macomb (1782–1841). Through his daughter Catherine, he was the grandfather of Stephen Van Rensselaer III (1764–1839), the patroon of Rensselaerswyck, Philip S. Van Rensselaer (1767–1824), the Mayor of Albany, Rensselaer Westerlo (1776–1851), a U.S. Representative, and Catharine Westerlo (1778–1846), who married John Woodworth, the New York State Attorney General.

=== Legacy ===
Livingston Avenue and the former Philip Livingston Magnet Academy, both in Albany, New York, are named for him. A public school in Brooklyn, PS 261 in Boerum Hill, used to be named for him, but the name was changed in 2022 to the Zipporiah Mills School, to honor the memory of a beloved and influential former principal at the school.

== See also ==
- Livingston family
- Memorial to the 56 Signers of the Declaration of Independence
