= List of mayors of Albany, New York =

Mayor of Albany
- Seal of the City of Albany

- Flag of the City of Albany
- Incumbent; Dorcey Applyrs since January 1, 2026
- Style: The Honorable
- Term length: Four years; renewable
- Inaugural holder: Pieter Schuyler
- Formation: 1686
- Salary: $135,402 (2017)

From its formal chartering on 22 July 1686 until 1779, the mayors of Albany, New York, were appointed by the royal governor of New York, per the provisions of the original city charter, issued by Governor Thomas Dongan.

From 1779 until 1839, mayors were chosen by the New York State's Council of Appointment, typically for a one-year term that began in September. From 1840 on, Albany's mayors were directly elected by the city's residents. Beginning in 1886, mayoral terms began on January 1 of the year after the mayor was elected.

A total of 74 men and two women have served as mayor since the city's inception; eighteen of them served multiple terms that were not consecutive. Erastus Corning 2nd served for over 40 years, longer than any other mayor of any other major United States city. Dorcey Applyrs (Democrat) is the current mayor; she was first elected in 2025, began service on January 1, 2026, and is currently in her first term of office.

== Seventeenth century ==
Mayor	Start	End	Comment
Pieter Schuyler	1686	1694	Colonel of the militia in King William's War. Much trusted by the Iroquois, he took their five Sachems to London to visit the court of Queen Anne, 1709-1710 (Note: Johannes Wendell was appointed in opposition in 1690 by political upstart Jacob Leisler in an attempt to supplant the existing provincial governance structure; no record exists that Wendell actually served, and Leisler was arrested and executed in 1691).
Johannes Abeel	1694	1695	Merchant and trader. Also served as alderman, judge, sheriff and recorder.
Evert Bancker	1695	1696	Farmed in Guilderland; one of the few city fathers who accepted an appointment to the council during the regime of Jacob Leisler; also served as Justice of the Peace, Commissioner of Indian Affairs and Master in Chancery; married to sister of Mayor Johannes Abeel.
Dirck Wesselse Ten Broeck	1696	1698	Served for 30 years as Indian Commissioner. Also captain in the militia. Alderman of the first city board in 1686. His great-grandson-in-law was Philip Livingston, signer of the Declaration of Independence. Philip Livingston was first cousin once removed of mayor Robert Livingston the Younger. Philip Livingston's wife, Christina Ten Broeck also was a cousin of Maria Ten Broeck, who married Continental Army General Gozen "Goose" Van Schaick, son of Albany Mayor Sybrant Gozen Van Schaick. Goose Van Schaick's sister was married to Continental Army General Peter Gansevoort—a great-nephew of Albany Mayor Pieter Van Brugh.
Hendrick Hansen	1698	1699	Provincial Assemblyman, Alderman, Indian Commissioner, trader, merchant.
Pieter Van Brugh	1699	1700	Surname sometimes spelled Verbrugge. Captain of the militia. Great-granduncle of Continental General Peter Gansevoort; constable, high constable, assessor, collector and contractor; one of the last people to be buried beneath the Old Albany Dutch church. His sister Catherina was the wife of Hendrick van Rensselaer, a brother-in-law of Albany Mayor Pieter Schuyler.

== Eighteenth century ==
Mayor	Start	End	Comment
Jan Jansen Bleecker	1700	1701	Born in Holland; emigrated to Albany in 1658. Negotiated support from the Iroquois tribes in the Dutch struggles against the French in Canada. Also served as City Chamberlain, Indian Commissioner, Recorder, Justice of the Peace and as a member of the Provincial Assembly.
Johannes Bleecker Jr.	1701	1702	Interpreter to the Indians. Carried captive to Canada in 1686, returned as year later. Also served as Recorder and member of the General Assembly. Son of Mayor Jan Jansen Bleecker and brother of Mayor Rutger Bleecker. City wall strengthened during his term in expectation of an attack from the French.
Albert Janse Ryckman	1702	1703	One of the most prominent Albany brewmasters of the late seventeenth century. Captain of the militia. Deacon in the Dutch Reformed Church.
Johannes Schuyler	1703	1706	Militia officer, trader, river transport operator. Brother of Pieter Schuyler and grandfather of Continental General Philip Schuyler. Enacted a law mandating that each homeowner had to build an eight-foot sidewalk. Also served as Indian Commissioner, member of Colonial Assembly and alderman.
David Davidse Schuyler	1706	1707	Brother of Mayor Myndert Schuyler; "fyre-masters" were ordered to inspect chimneys during his term. Also served as alderman, Justice, County Sheriff, Indian Commissioner and delegate to the Council of the Onondagas.
Evert Bancker	1707	1709	See first term entry above
Johannes Abeel	1709	1710	See first term entry above
Robert Livingston the Younger	1710	1719	Nephew of Mayor Robert Livingston. Married to daughter of Mayor Pieter Schuyler. Born in Scotland, emigrated in 1687. Accused by the Boston Board of Trade of being a partner with pirate Captain Kidd since Kidd was using his ship, he was later exonerated. Member of the Colonial Assembly, Indian Commissioner, Secretary of the City.
Myndert Schuyler	1719	1720	Merchant. Ordered construction of small houses outside the city walls to house Indians who came to trade. Also served as member of the Assembly, Church Master, Indian Commissioner, Lieutenant Colonel of the Militia, Alderman.
Pieter Van Brugh	1720	1723	See first term entry above
Myndert Schuyler	1723	1725	See first term entry above
Johannes Cuyler	1725	1726	Elder in the Dutch Church, Indian Commissioner, trader. Admitted freeman of New York City. Commissioner of Indian Affairs. Married to daughter of Mayor Dirck Wesselse Ten Broeck.
Rutger Bleecker	1726	1729	Merchant. Son of Mayor Jan Jansen Bleecker, brother of Mayor Johannes Bleecker; married to widow of Mayor Johannes Abeel. Enacted laws restricting the sale of intoxicants to Indians. Also served as Recorder.
Johannes DePeyster	1729	1731	Son of Johannes de Peyster, a Mayor of New York City and a Huguenot. Purchased Albany's first fire-fighting equipment, ladders and fire-hooks. Married daughter of Mayor Myndert Schuyler. Also served as Recorder, Indian Commissioner, member of Provincial Assembly, Captain of the Cavalry, Inspector of Ordinance, Surrogate of Albany County and Paymaster of the New York Forces. His daughter married Albany Mayor Volkert P. Douw.
Johannes "Hans" Hansen	1731	1732	Trader, son of Mayor Hendrick Hansen, married daughter of Mayor Johannes Cuyler. Spent much of his youth west of Albany in Indian lands.
Johannes DePeyster	1732	1732	See first term entry above
Edward Holland	1733	1740	First English Mayor of Albany, his father commanded the Albany garrison. Signed a City Ordinance "To prevent Negroes or Indian slaves to appear in the streets after eight at night without a lanthorn and lighted candle in it."
Johannes Schuyler Jr.	1740	1741	Son of Mayor Johannes Schuyler, father of General Philip Schuyler. Businessman with lucrative government contracts and large dowry from his New York City Dutch wife's family; appointed to a second term as mayor but declined to take required oath of allegiance and did not serve. Also served as Indian Commissioner and alderman.
Johannes DePeyster	1741	1742	See first term entry above
Cornelis Cuyler	1742	1746	Fur trader and merchant, represented Albany's interests in Mohawk Country and Canada; alderman, active member of Indian Affairs Commission. Son of Mayor Johannes Cuyler, grandson (via mother) of Mayor Dirck Wesselse Ten Broeck, father of Mayor Abraham Cuyler.
Dirck Ten Broeck	1746	1748	Merchant, grandson of Mayor Dirck Wesselse Ten Broeck. Also served as City Inspector of Skins, Alderman, Recorder and Commissioner of Indian Affairs.
Jacob Coenraedt Ten Eyck	1748	1750	Indian Commissioner, silversmith, judge, and member of Albany's Committee of Safety during the Revolutionary War
Robert Sanders	1750	1754	English native who married into the influential Dutch Schuyler family at a time when it was without a strong male leader; his administration hosted the Albany Congress.
Johannes (Hans) Hansen	1754	1756	See first term entry above; died in office during this term
Sybrant Gozen Van Schaick	1756	1761	Trader and landholder, his administration witnessed some of the most active local phases of the French and Indian War.
Volkert Petrus Douw	1761	1770	Merchant and one of the founders of Albany Savings Bank, second oldest bank in New York. Married daughter of Mayor Johannes DePeyster. Also served as alderman, recorder, captain of the militia, judge, member of the Colonial Assembly, Indian Commissioner, Committee of Safety, Commissary of the Northern Army, New York State Senator.
Abraham Cornelis Cuyler	1770	1778	Third generation member of his family to serve as mayor, grandson (via mother) of Mayor Johannes Schuyler. Last mayor of colonial Albany, cooperated with English interests as local tensions mounted; arrested by Revolutionaries and exiled to Connecticut; condemned to death in 1779 under Act of Attainder; after peace with Britain was secured, he attempted to return to Albany but was unable to reclaim his property and died in Canada in 1810.
John Barclay	1778	1779	Member of Albany Committee of Correspondence; first mayor under new State government; died in office.
Abraham Ten Broeck	1779	1783	Lawyer, banker. Son of Mayor Dirck Ten Broeck. During his term, Albany was designated the capital of New York and whipping posts were abolished in the city; a prominent citizen and co-administrator of the Manor of Rensselaerswyck for Patroon Stephen Van Rensselaer, also served as member of the Colonial Assembly, delegate to the Continental Congress, Brigadier-General of the Army, President of the Committee of Safety, New York State Senator, Judge, President of the Bank of Albany.
Johannes Jacobse Beekman	1783	1786	Firemaster, alderman, member of New York State Assembly; active in Albany Committee of Correspondence
John Lansing Jr.	1786	1790	Also delegate to the U.S. Constitutional Convention, member of the Continental Congress, Speaker of the Assembly and Chief Justice of the New York Supreme Court, among other duties. During his term, the New York Convention ratified the United States Constitution. He disappeared on December 12, 1829 in New York City; he was last seen by the doorman at City Hotel.
Abraham Yates Jr.	1790	1796	Financier. Delegate to the Continental Congress, Albany's first Postmaster and founding trustee of Union College. Oil street lamps installed during his term. New York State Senator for first 13 sessions. Delegate to the Continental Congress.
Abraham Ten Broeck	1796	1798	See first term entry above
Philip S. Van Rensselaer	1799	1816	Grandson of Philip Livingston. Third longest total time of service by an Albany mayor, after Erastus Corning II and Gerald D. Jennings; ordered the State Capitol built; Robert Fulton's North River Steamboat arrived in Albany on its first voyage during his term, and Schenectady County was created from Albany.

== Nineteenth century ==
Mayor	Start	End	Comment
Elisha Jenkins	1816	1819	Key figure in an early Albany scandal in 1807, when he was assaulted by General Solomon Van Rensselaer after passing a resolution questioning Van Rensselaer's honesty. A riot ensued, and Jenkins' nephew, Francis Bloodgood, struck and seriously wounded Van Rensselaer with a cane. Suits and countersuits were filed. Jenkins' appointment as mayor has been viewed as a politically motivated move and further slight against the Van Rensselaer family; Jenkins resigned in 1819 and his term was completed by Philip Schuyler Van Rensselaer. Bloodgood later became Mayor of Albany as well. Jenkins also served as New York State Senator, State Comptroller, Secretary of State and Quartermaster to the General Northern Department during the War of 1812.
Philip Schuyler Van Rensselaer	1819	1820	See first term entry above
Charles E. Dudley	1821	1824	Merchant. Key early petitioner for the Erie Canal, helped found Cohoes Company to tap the power of the Mohawk River. The Albany Basin of Erie Canal completed during his term and canal began operation. His widow donated funds to found Dudley Observatory.
Ambrose Spencer	1824	1826	His wife was the sister of Governor DeWitt Clinton; also Attorney General of New York and Chief Justice of the New York Supreme Court, and member of the United States House of Representatives.
James Stevenson	1826	1828	Lawyer, one of the first governors of Albany City Hospital. During his term, a large celebration was held in Albany on the effective date of the emancipation of slaves in New York; resigned in 1828.
Charles E. Dudley	1828	1829	See first term entry above; resigned in 1829
John Townsend	1829	1830	Laid the cornerstone for Albany's old City Hall in 1829; major cholera outbreak during his term. Advised DeWitt Clinton in Erie Canal matters. Also president of National Commercial Bank, president of the Albany Exchange Company, president of the Water Commission, vice president of Albany Savings Bank.
Francis Bloodgood	1831	1831	Clerk of the New York State Supreme Court, president of New York State Bank. See entry under Elisha Jenkins above for his role in a politically motivated brawl in 1807.
John Townsend	1832	1832	See first term entry above
Francis Bloodgood	1833	1833	See first term entry above
Erastus Corning	1834	1837	Founder of the New York Central Railroad and member of the United States House of Representatives; resigned in 1837.
Teunis Van Vechten	1837	1839	President of Albany Insurance Company and attorney to Patroon Stephen Van Rensselaer; first locomotive arrived from Boston during his term, though passengers disembarked in Greenbush (Rensselaer) and crossed the river by ferry; resigned in 1839.
Jared Lewis Rathbone	1839	1841	Last mayor chosen by the common council, appointed to complete Mayor Van Vechten's term. Elected mayor in 1840 after city charter amendment provided for popular vote for mayor. President of Albany Medical College. Also served as alderman. Father of Henry Rathbone
Teunis Van Vechten	1841	1842	See first term entry above
Barent Philip Staats	1842	1843	Physician, alderman, strong temperance sensibilities.
Friend Humphrey	1843	1845	Born in Connecticut, relocated to Albany in 1811. Albany Rural Cemetery was consecrated and Albany's first telegraph office opened during his term. Advocate for public morality, he closed public markets on Sundays. New York State Senator.
John Keyes Paige	1845	1846	New York State Supreme Court Clerk from 1825 until his election as mayor. President of the Canal Bank.
William Parmelee	1846	1848	Lawyer. Also served as city attorney, judge and recorder.
John Taylor	1848	1849	Brewer. Known for his fine private library.
Friend Humphrey	1849	1850	See first term entry above
Franklin Townsend	1850	1851	Adjutant General of the State of New York, Assemblyman, President of New York State National Bank, Vice-President of Albany Savings Bank; nephew of Mayor John Townsend
Eli Perry	1851	1854	Merchant in livestock and provisions. Contracted to supply Union forces during the Civil War but lost his fortune in the process. Cousin of Commodore William Perry; Albany Law School organized during his tenure as mayor. Also served as alderman and Member of United States House of Representatives. Organized Albany Orphan Asylum.
William Parmelee	1854	1856	See first term entry above; died in office
Charles Watson Godard	1856	1856	Appointed by common council on the death of William Parmalee. Also served as captain of the Port of New York, and was a prominent lecturer and philanthropist.
Eli Perry	1856	1860	See first term entry above
George Hornell Thacher	1860	1862	Owned Thacher Carwheel Co., headed Albany's substantial humanitarian efforts during the Civil War. Also served as an alderman.
Eli Perry	1862	1866	See first term entry above
George Hornell Thacher	1866	1868	See first term entry above
Charles Edward Bleecker	1868	1870	Planned Washington Park. During his term, construction of the Capitol began. First Mayor to have veto power.
George Hornell Thacher	1870	1874	See first term entry above; resigned during electoral challenge
John G. Burch	1874	1874	Coal and wood dealer and alderman. Appointed to serve as mayor during contested election between George Hornell Thacher and Edmund Lewis Judson.
Edmund L. Judson	1874	1876	Flour and provision merchant. Election was contested by George Thacher; contest dragged through the courts for two years; Judson was declared the winner only weeks before his first term ended. Also served as alderman.
Anthony Bleecker Banks	1876	1878	Principal partner of Banks & Brothers, law publishers, booksellers, and importers; one of the oldest legal publishing houses in the United States. Served in New York State Assembly, New York State Senate. President of the Greenbush Bridge Company.
Michael N. Nolan	1878	1883	Born in Ireland, also served in United States House of Representatives. Albany's City Hall was destroyed by fire during his term; he resigned in 1883. He was the first Roman Catholic Mayor of Albany.
John Swinburne	1883	1884	Physician who served as a Medical Officer during the Civil War, and Surgeon-in-Chief of American Ambulance Corps during the Franco-Prussian War. Electric streetlights installed in Albany during his time as mayor. His election was contested, and he was not formally seated until near the end of his elected term. He was one of the four founding physicians involved in establishing Albany Medical College.
Anthony Bleecker Banks	1884	1886	See first term entry above
John Boyd Thacher	1886	1888	Author, philanthropist, bibliophile. Son of Mayor George Hornell Thacher, uncle of Mayor John Boyd Thacher II. Also served as New York State Senator. In 1914, his widow donated the family land that formed the nucleus of the present-day John Boyd Thacher State Park.
Edward A. Maher	1888	1890	President of Union Railway Company and South End Bank.
James Hilton Manning	1890	1894	Son of Daniel Manning. Publisher, President of the Weed Parsons Printing Company. Albany Railway Company (operator of Albany's trolleys) converted to electric power during his term, eliminating horse-drawn carriages. Also President of the Hudson River Telephone Company and President of National Savings Bank.
Oren Elbridge Wilson	1894	1895	President of the Board of Education, Chief Accountant for Whitney's Dry Goods Company. Also served as School Commissioner and President of the Board of Education. Appointed a Water Board favorable to building a filtration plant for the city, and significantly increased the size of the fire department. (Note: from this point forward, terms end on December 31, and the next Mayor's term begins on January 1, hence non-overlapping years)
John Boyd Thacher	1896	1897	See first term entry above
Thomas J. Van Alstyne	1898	1899	Civil War veteran, attorney; first public water filtration plant opened during his term. Also served as Judge, member of United States House of Representatives, and as a trustee of the Albany Institute.

== Twentieth century ==
Mayor	Start	End	Comment
James H. Blessing	1900	1901	Inventor of the return steam trap; superintendent of the Townsend and Jackson Foundry and Machine Works; first Republican elected mayor in over 20 years. His election marked the beginning of two decades of control by Albany's Republicans, who were led by William Barnes Jr. Albany's first public baths were opened during Blessing's administration.
Charles H. Gaus	1902	1908	Pharmacist and military officer. Major labor unrest at various times during his term, with butchers, trolley drivers, stovemounters, printers, composers and others striking. Also served as School Commissioner and Street Commissioner. Resigned to become New York State Comptroller.
Henry F. Snyder	1909	1909	Completed the fourth term of Charles H. Gaus; after completing his term as mayor was appointed Postmaster of Albany.
James B. McEwan	1910	1913	President of McEwan Coal Company. Glenn Curtiss flew non-stop from Albany to New York City during his term. Also served in New York State Assembly, New York State Senate, and Postmaster.
Joseph William Stevens	1914	1917	Tobacco merchant, Civil War veteran, also served as alderman and president of the common council.
James R. Watt	1918	1921	Last mayor of the Barnes Republican machine era and last Republican mayor of Albany to date (see James Henry Blessing above); major corruption scandals related to Barnes (primarily surrounding the misdirection of coal purchased by the city to machine favorites at a time of extremely high coal prices to the general populace) and a lengthy transit strike allowed Democrats to reclaim nearly every city office behind newly elected Mayor Hackett; Daniel P. "Uncle Dan" O'Connell and his brothers were instrumental in rallying Democrats, and went on to be major Democratic power brokers in Albany, in allegiance with brothers Parker and Edwin Corning, grandsons of Mayor Erastus Corning; Edwin was also father to Erastus Corning 2nd. In 1919, Watt became the first Albany mayor to win an election in which women voted.
William Stormont Hackett	1922	1926	Banker and attorney; admitted to the bar by reading law. Died while in office, killed in a car accident in Cuba; contemporary accounts indicate that he would have been the next Democratic nominee for Governor of New York had he lived. First mayor elected under the patronage of the emerging Dan O'Connell and Edwin Corning-led political alliance, which merged blue-collar Irish Catholic and wealthy Episcopal factions into a machine that dominated Albany politics for most of the 20th Century.
John Boyd Thacher II	1927	1940	Attorney and banker; fourth longest total time of service by an Albany mayor, after Erastus Corning 2nd, Philip S. Van Rensselaer and Gerald D. Jennings; a loyal O'Connell-Corning patronage selectee who resigned in 1940 to serve as Judge of the Albany County Children's Court.
Herman F. Hoogkamp	1940	1941	Linotype machinist for the Knickerbocker News. Completed unexpired term of John Boyd Thacher II.
Erastus Corning 2nd	1942	1983	Insurance salesman and son of Edwin Corning, long-time Dan O'Connell ally. Longest-serving mayor of a major city in American history. Great-grandson of Mayor Erastus Corning; with O'Connell, presided over one of the most successful political patronage machines in American history. Corning died in office during his eleventh term as mayor.
Frank Salisbury Harris	1944	1945	Real estate agent; acting mayor during Corning's military service in World War II.
Thomas Michael Whalen III	1983	1993	Attorney. His tenure is noted for its focus on successful financial and civil service reform, opening the processes of city hall, using the arts and the city park system as a catalyst for growth and improving the city's image both domestically and worldwide. The city was designated an "All-American City" under his leadership, attained the highest possible bond rating from Moody's and hosted many successful downtown cultural events. A memorial statue of him can be found in downtown Albany's Tricentennial Park.
Gerald D. Jennings	1994	2013	Public school teacher and administrator, and former Albany Alderman. He won a shocking upset in the 1993 Democratic mayoral primary over Harold Joyce, who had the Democratic Party's formal endorsement and had only recently been its chairman. This primary victory is often viewed as marking the end of the Corning-O'Connell machine era in Albany. While Mayor Jennings was serving his fifth term in office, in May 2013, he announced that he would not seek a new term. He retired on December 31, 2013, as the second longest-serving mayor in Albany's history, after only Erastus Corning 2nd.

== Twenty-first century ==
Image	Mayor	Start	End	Comment
	Kathy Sheehan	2014	2025	Mayor Sheehan was the 75th mayor of Albany. She was previously the city treasurer. She was the first female mayor of Albany and the first new mayor in 20 years.
	Dorcey Applyrs	2026	Present	Mayor Applyrs is the 76th mayor of Albany. She holds a PhD from the University at Albany and was previously the chief city auditor. She is the first Black mayor of Albany.

== See also ==
- Mayoral elections in Albany, New York
