= Dirck Wesselse Ten Broeck =

American politician

Mayor of Albany, New York
- In office 1696–1698
- Preceded by: Evert Bancker
- Succeeded by: Hendrick Hansen

Personal details
- Born: December 18, 1638
- Died: November 24, 1717 (aged 78) Clermont, Province of New York
- Spouse: Christyna Van Buren (m. 1663)
- Children: 13
- Parent: Wessel Ten Broeck
- Relatives: Johannes Cuyler (son-in-law)

Dirck Wesselse Ten Broeck (December 18, 1638 – November 24, 1717), also known as Dirck Wessels, was a prominent early settler of Albany, New York. He is known as "the progenitor of the Albany family of Ten Broecks."

== Early life ==
Dirck Ten Broeck was born on December 18, 1638, the second of five children of Wessel Ten Broeck, who worked for the West India Company.

== Career ==
In 1663, he was listed as "a free merchant in Albany", and purchased a house and lot on the corner of State and James Streets. In 1676, Governor Thomas Dongan appointed him Magistrate Commissary, and later Envoy to Canada. In 1686 he was a signatory of the "Charter of Beverwijck." After the first election under the charter he was appointed Recorder, in which office he served for ten years.

In 1684, he was one of the purchasers of the 150,000-acre Saratoga Patent together with Cornelis Van Dyck, Jan Jansen Bleecker, Pieter Schuyler, Johannes Wendel, David Schuyler, and Robert Livingston the Elder. He was one of the purchasers of the disputed Mohawk Patent in 1697, and other properties.

=== Political career ===
At the time of the Schenectady massacre in 1690 Ten Broeck served as envoy to the Mohawks, Oneidas, and Onondagas to determine their loyalties. At this time also he served as a Major in the militia under Colonel Pieter Schuyler.

In 1696, he was appointed Mayor of Albany by Governor Benjamin Fletcher. He was elected to the first Provincial Assembly of New York, and served through the Fifth Assembly. During Leisler's Rebellion he refused his support to Jacob Leisler.

Together with Pieter Schuyler, Godfridius Dellius, and Evert Bancker, he was one of the four original members of the Commissioners for Indian Affairs appointed by Governor Fletcher in 1696.

== Personal life ==
Coat of Arms of Dirck Wesselse Ten Broeck

In 1663, he married Christyna Van Buren (1644–1729), the daughter of Cornelis Maessen Van Buren and Catalyntje Martensen, in Albany. The couple had six sons and seven daughters:

- Wessel Ten Broeck (1664–1747), who married Catherina Loockermans (1669–1729) in 1684.
- Elsje Ten Broeck (d. 1752), who married Johannes Cuyler (1661–1740) in 1684.
- Catalyntje Ten Broeck (1666–1725), who married Johannes Legget in 1688.
- Cornelia Ten Broeck (1669–1729), who married Johannes Wynkoop, son of Cornelius Wynkoopm, in 1696.
- Christina Ten Broeck (1672–1774), who married Johannes Van Alen (d. 1750), son of Pieter Van Alen, in 1701.
- Geertruy Ten Broeck (1675–1728), who married Abraham Davidse Schuyler (1663–1726), a nephew of Philip Pieterse Schuyler, in 1691.
- Elizabeth Ten Broeck (d. 1757), who married Anthony Coster (d. 1753) in 1698.
- Lidia Ten Broeck (1675–1748), who married Volkert Van Vechten, son of Gerrit Teunisse Van Vechten, in 1702.
- Samuel Ten Broeck (1680–1756), who married Maria Van Rensselaer (1689–1756), daughter of Hendrick van Rensselaer, in 1712.
- Ephraim Ten Broeck (b. 1681), twin that died young.
- Manassa Ten Broeck (b. 1681), twin that died young.
- Johannes Ten Broeck (b. 1683), who married Elizabeth Wendell, daughter of Johannes Wendell and Elizabeth Staats, in 1709. After her death, he married Catryna Van Rensselaer, another daughter of Hendrick van Rensselaer, in 1714.
- Tobias Ten Broeck (1689−1724), who married Maritie Van Stryen in 1714. After her death, he married Dominic Johannes Van Driessen (d. 1734), in 1727.

Dirck Ten Broeck died on November 24, 1717, at his estate called "The Bouwerie" in Clermont, Province of New York and was buried there.

== See also ==
- History of Albany, New York

Political offices
Preceded by Evert Bancker	Mayor of Albany, New York; 1696–1698	Succeeded by Hendrick Hansen
