= Schuyler family =

Dutch-American family

Schuyler
- Current region: United States
- Etymology: Possibly derived from Scheulder, a hamlet near Valkenburg aan de Geul, Netherlands
- Origin: Netherlands
- Connected families: Bayard family Livingston family Van Cortlandt family Van Rensselaer family Roosevelt Family; Hamilton family Cuyler baronets
- Estates: Schuyler, New York; Schuyler Mansion; Schuyler House; Schuyler–Colfax House; Schuyler House, Pompton Lakes, New Jersey; The Grove; West Neck, Pelham, New York; New Barbadoes Neck; Schuyler Flatts

The Schuyler family (/ˈskaɪlər/; Dutch pronunciation: [sxœylər]) was a prominent Dutch family in New York and New Jersey in the 18th and 19th centuries, whose descendants played a critical role in the formation of the United States (especially New York City and northern New Jersey), in leading government and business in North America and served as leaders in business, military, politics, and society. The other two most influential New York dynasties of the 18th and 19th centuries were the Livingston family and the Clinton family.

== History ==
By 1650, Philip Pieterse Schuyler immigrated to New Netherland, settling in Beverwyck. His brother, David Pieterse Schuyler, also emigrated from The Dutch Republic.

The Schuyler family ancestry and ties were factors in several major American families, including the Livingston family, the Oyster Bay branch of the Roosevelt family, the Bayard family, the Bush family and the Kean family, among others. Descendants also exist in some noble families in the United Kingdom (including the Gage family, the Kennedy family, the Bertie family, and the Fitzroy family, among others).

== Family tree ==
=== Philip Pieterse Schuyler line ===
- Pieter Tjercks (patronymic, not a family name) (c. 1601–1656) m. Geertruyt Philips van Schuylder (1603–1651)
  - Philip Pieterse Schuyler (1628–1683) m. Margarita Van Slichtenhorst (1627–1710)
    - Geertruy Schuyler (b. 1654) m. Stephanus van Cortlandt (1643–1700)
      - Margaretta van Cortlandt m. 1696: Judge Samuel Bayard (b. 1669), son of Nicholas Bayard, Mayor of New York
        - Gertrude Bayard m. Peter Kemble (1704–1789), a prominent New Jersey businessman and politician
          - Margaret Kemble (1734–1824) m. Thomas Gage (1718/19–1787), General of the British Army during the American Revolutionary War. Descendants of this union are found in England, including amongst the Viscounts Gage and the noble Bertie family in England (including those holding the title of Earl of Abingdon).
      - Anne van Cortlandt (1676–1724) m. Stephen DeLancey (1663–1741)
        - James DeLancey (1703–1760), New York Governor
        - Susannah de Lancey (1707–1771) m. Vice-Admiral Sir Peter Warren (1703–1752)
        - Oliver De Lancey Sr. (1718–1785) m. Phila Franks, daughter of Abigail Franks and member of prominent Jewish colonial family.
        - Anne de Lancey (b. 1723) m. John Watts, ancestors of the Marquess of Ailsa in Scotland, the Duke of Grafton and the Viscount Daventry in England.
      - Catherine van Cortlandt m. Andrew Johnston (1694–1762), a New Jersey politician and son of John Johnstone, the 32nd Mayor of New York City.
      - Elizabeth van Cortlandt m. Reverend William Skinner
        - Lt. General William Skinner, a Loyalist
        - Brig. Gen. Cortlandt Skinner (1727–1799), a Loyalist m. Elizabeth Kearney (1731–1810)
      - Philip van Cortlandt (1683–1746) m. Catherine De Peyster
        - Pierre van Cortlandt (1721–1814), the 1st Lieutenant Governor of New York m. Joanna Livingston (granddaughter of Robert Livingston)
          - Philip van Cortlandt (1749–1831)
          - Pierre van Cortlandt, Jr. (1762–1848)
    - Alida Schuyler (b. 1656) m. (1) 1675: Nicholas van Rensselaer (1636–1678); m. (2) 1679: Robert Livingston the Elder (1654–1728)
      - Johannes Livingston (1680–1720)
      - Margaret Livingston (b. 1681)
      - Joanna Philipina Livingston (1683–1689)
      - Philip Livingston (1686–1749) m. Catherine Van Brugh
        - Robert Livingston (1708–1790) m. (1) 1731: Maria Thong (granddaughter of Gov. Rip Van Dam); m. (2) 1766: Gertrude (née Van Rensselaer) Schuyler.
          - Walter Livingston (1740–1797) m. Cornelia Schuyler (1746–1822), his cousin
            - Henry Walter Livingston (1768–1810) m. 1796: Mary Allen
        - Peter Van Brugh Livingston (1712–1792) m. Mary Alexander, sister of William Alexander, Lord Stirling
        - Philip Livingston (1717–1778) m. 1740: Christina Ten Broeck
          - Sarah Livingston (1752–1814) m. John Henry Livingston (1746–1825), her second cousin
        - Mary Livingston (1738-1821) m. James Duane (1733-1797)
          - Adelia Duane (1675-1860) m. Alfred Sands Pell (1786-1831)
            - Robert Livingston Pell (1818-1880) m. Maria Louisa Brinckerhoff (1816-1866)
            - James Duane Pell (1813-1881) m. Sophia Gertrude Pell (1815-1885)
      - Robert Livingston (1688–1775) m. Margaret Howarden (1693–1758)
      - Hubertus ("Gilbert") Livingston (b. 1690) m. Cornelia Beekman, granddaughter of Wilhelmus Beekman
      - William Livingston (1692–1692), died young.
      - Joanna Livingston (b. 1694)
      - Catherine Livingston (1698–1699), died young.
    - Pieter Schuyler m. Engeltie Van Schaick (d. 1689) m. Maria Van Rensselaer
      - Margarita Schuyler m. Robert Livingston the Younger
        - Engeltie Livingston m. Johannes Van Rensselaer
          - James Van Rensselaer (1747–1827)
      - Gertruj Schuyler (b. 1694) m. Johannes Lansing
      - Col. Phillipus Schuyler (b. 1696) m. Margarita Schuyler
      - Pieter Schuyler (b. 1698), a twin of Jeremiah m. Catherine Groesbeck.
        - Pieter P. Schuyler (1723–1753) m. Geertruy "Gertrude" Schuyler (1724–1813), his cousin
          - Cornelia Schuyler (1746–1822) m. Walter Livingston (1740–1797)
          - Pieter P. Schuyler, Jr. (1748–1792) m. Geertruy "Gertrude" Lansing (b. 1748/9)
        - Stephen Schuyler (1732–1798) m. Engeltje Van Vechten (1732–1792)
          - John Schuyler (1768–1843) m. Anna Cuyler m. Maria Miller (1784–1832)
            - Angelica Schuyler (1820–1896) m. Clarkson Floyd Crosby (1817–1858)
              - John Schuyler Crosby (1839–1914) m. Harriet Van Rensselaer (1838–1911)
          - Jeremiah Schuyler (1768–1843) m. 1793: Jane Cuyler (1770–1832)
            - Cornelius Schuyler (1795–1876) m. 1817: Harriett L. Hillhouse (1798–1857)
        - Philip P. Schuyler (1736–1808) m. Anna Wendell (1743–1802)
          - Catharina Schuyler (1766–1820) m. Abraham Van Vechten (1762–1837)
      - Jeremias Schuyler (1698–1753), a twin of Pieter m. Susanna Bayeux
    - Brandt Schuyler (1659–1752) m. Cornelia Van Cortlandt (1659–1722)
    - Arent Schuyler (1662–1730) m. (1) Jannetje Teller, m. (2) Swantje Van Duyckhuysen (1679–1720), m. (3) Maria Walter
      - Margareta Schuyler (b. 1685)
      - Philip Schuyler (b. 1687) m. Hester Kingsland
      - Maria Schuyler (b. 1689), died young
      - Olivia Schuyler
      - Judik Schuyler (b. 1692)
      - Casparus Schuyler (1695–1754) m. Mary Schuyler
        - Arent Schuyler m. 1748: Jannetje Van Wagenen
      - Wilhemus Schuyler (b. 1700), died young
      - Peter Schuyler (1707–1762) m. (1) Hester Walter, m. (2) Mary Walter
        - Katherine Schuyler (1737–1765) m. Archibald Kennedy, 11th Earl of Cassilis (1736–1794)
      - Eva Schuyler (d. 1737) m. Peter Bayard
      - Adonijah "Adonis" Schuyler (1708–1763) m. Gertrude Van Rensselaer (b. 1714), daughter of Kiliaen Van Rensselaer
      - John Schuyler (1710–1773) m. Anne Van Rensselaer (b. 1719), daughter of Kiliaen Van Rensselaer
        - Elsey Schuyler Heminover (1760–1848) m. Anthony Heminover (1750/1824), Patriot Soldier From Moravia
        - Mary Schuyler Roosevelt (b.1762) m. Johannes Roosevelt (1751/1820), Great uncle to Theodore
      - Cornelia Schuyler (1715–1785) m. Pierre Guillaume DePeyster (1707–1785)
        - Arent Schuyler DePeyster (1736–1822), British military officer
    - Philipse "Philip" Schuyler (1666–1724) m. (1) 1687: Elizabeth De Meyer; m. (2) 1719: Catherine Schierph (widow of Ritsert Brouwer)
      - Nicholas Schuyler (1691–1748) m. (1) 1714: Elsie Wendell (1689–1744); m. (2) 1744: Mary Stevenson
        - Ariaantie Schuyler (1720–1763) m. Kiliaen van Rensselaer (1717–1781)
          - Killian K. Van Rensselaer (1763–1845) m. 1791: Margaret Sanders (1764–1830)
        - Harmanus Schuyler (1727–1796) m. Christina ten Broeck
          - John Harmanus Schuyler (1763–1846) m. Annatje Schuyler (1770-1851)
            - George W. Schuyler (1810–1888) m. Matilda Scribner
              - Eugene Schuyler (1840–1890)
              - Walter S. Schuyler (1850–1932)
    - Johannes Schuyler (1668–1747) m. 1695: Elizabeth Staats (d. 1737)
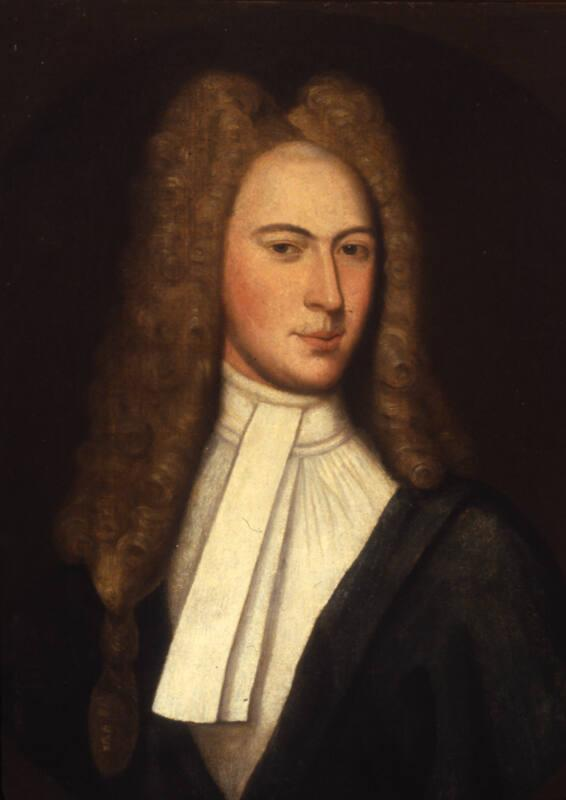
      Philip Johannes Schuyler
      - Philip Johannes Schuyler (d. 1745), killed during the French and Indian raid on Saratoga on November 28, 1745.
      - Johannes Schuyler Jr. (1697–1741) m. Cornelia van Cortlandt (1698–1762), (daughter of Stephanus Van Cortlandt his first cousin)
        - Geertruy "Gertrude" Schuyler (1724–1813) m. (1) Pieter P. Schuyler (1723–1753), her cousin; m. (2) John Cochran (1730–1807)
          - James Cochran (1769–1848) m. Catherine Van Rensselaer Schuyler (1781–1857), his first cousin
        - Cortlandt Schuyler (1735-1773) m. (1) Francis Fox
        - Stephanus Schuyler (1737-1820) m. (1) Lena Ten Eyck (1745-1818)
          - Stephen Van Rensselaer m. Mary De Bright
            - Cortlandt Van Rensselaer (1820-1879) m. Salina Sarah Smith
              - Cortlandt Ten Eyck (1856-1909) m. Anne Fanning Carroll
        - Gen. Philip Schuyler (1733–1804) m. Catherine Van Rensselaer (1734–1803) (see above)
          - Angelica Schuyler (1756–1814) m. John Barker Church (1748–1818)
            - Philip Schuyler Church m. Anna Matilda Stewart, daughter of Walter Stewart
          - Elizabeth Schuyler (1757–1854) m. Alexander Hamilton (1755/7–1804), the first Secretary of the United States Treasury, and the Senior Officer of the United States Army from 1799-1800.
            - Hamilton family
          - Margarita "Peggy" Schuyler (1758–1801) m. Stephen Van Rensselaer III (1764–1839)
            - Stephen Van Rensselaer IV (1789–1868) m. Harriet Elizabeth Bayard (1799–1875)
              - Margaret Schuyler Van Rensselaer (1819–1897) m. (1) John de Peyster Douw (1812–1901) m. (2) Wilmot Johnson (1820–1899)
              - Cornelia Patterson Van Rensselaer (1823–1897) m. Nathaniel Thayer, Jr. (1808–1883)
              - Stephen Van Rensselaer (1824–1861) m. Annie Louise Wild
              - Catherine Van Rensselaer (1827–1909) m. Nathaniel Berry (1811–1865)
              - Justine Van Rensselaer (1828–1912) m. Dr. Howard Townsend (1823–1867)
              - Bayard Van Rensselaer (1833–1859) m. Laura Reynolds (1830–1912)
              - Harriet Van Rensselaer (1838–1911) m. John Schuyler Crosby (1839–1914)
              - Eugene Van Rensselaer (1840–1925) m. Sarah Boyd Pendleton (1846–1923)
          - John Bradstreet Schuyler (1765–1795) m. Elizabeth Van Rensselaer (1768–1841)
          - Philip Jeremiah Schuyler (1768–1835) m. (1) Sarah Rutsen (d. 1805) m. (2) Mary Anna Sawyer
            - Philip P. Schuyler (1789–1875) m. Rosanna Livingston
            - Stephan Van Rensselaer Schuyler (1792–1859) m. Catherine Morris
            - Catherine Schuyler (1793–1875) m. Samuel Jones (1770–1853)
            - John Rutsen Schuyler (1796–1875)
            - Robert Livingston Schuyler (1798–1855) m. Lucinda Waldron "Lucy" Wood (1807–1882)
              - Julia Wood Schuyler m. 1850: Rev. William Orne Lamson (1824–1909)
                - George Henry Lamson (1852–1882)
                - Robert Schuyler Lamson (1855–1876)
              - Robert Sands Schuyler (1830–1895) m. 1864: Caroline E. Acker (1840–1905)
              - William Sawyer Schuyler (1840–1864) m. 1859: Florence Miriam Barbour (1840–1895) (niece of Reuben H. Walworth)
            - William Schuyler (1807–1829)
            - Sybil Schuyler (1809–1813)
            - George Lee Schuyler (1811–1890) m. (1) Eliza Hamilton (1811–1863) m. (2) Mary Morris Hamilton (1815–1877)
          - Henry Schuyler Thibodaux (1769–1827), Acadian orphan adopted by Gen. Philip Schuyler, fourth Governor of Louisiana (1824)
            - Bannon Goforth Thibodeaux (1812–1866), member of the U.S. House of Representatives from Louisiana (1845–1849)
          - Rensselaer Schuyler (1773–1847) m. Elizabeth Ten Broeck, daughter of Abraham Ten Broeck
          - Catherine Van Rensselaer Schuyler (1781–1857) m. (1) Samuel Malcolm m. (2) James Cochran (1769–1848), her first cousin
      - "Madame" Margarita Schuyler (b. 1701) m. Phillipus Schuyler, her first cousin
      - Catalentie Schuyler (b. 1704) m. Mayor Cornelis Cuyler (1697–1765)
        - Johannes Cuyler (1729–1749)
        - Elizabeth Cuyler (1731–1815) m. 1752: Jacobus Van Cortlandt (1726–1781) (grandson of Jacobus Van Cortlandt)
        - Philip Cuyler (b. 1733) m. 1757: Sarah Tweedy (1739–1825)
        - Hendrick "Henry" Cuyler (1735–1803), royalist m. 1767: Catharina Lydius (1743–1818)
        - Elsje "Elsie" Cuyler (1737–1761) m. 1760: Augustus Van Cortlandt (1728–1823) (grandson of Jacobus Van Cortlandt)
        - Margarita Cuyler (1738–1802) m. 1760: Isaac Low (1735–1791), a royalist
          - Isaac Low, became a field officer in the British army.
          - Helena Low m. Dirck Hansen, operator of the Albany-Greenbush ferry
        - Sir Cornelius Cuyler, 1st Baronet (1740–1819) m. 1763: Anne Wendell
        - Abraham Cornelius Cuyler (1742–1810) m. 1764: Jannetje "Janet" Glen
          - Jacob Glen Cuyler (1773–1854) m. 1808: Maria Elizabeth Hartman
    - Margareta Schuyler (1672–1748) m. Jacobus Verplanck (1671–1771)

=== David Pieterse Schuyler line ===
- Pieter Tjercks (c. 1601–1656) m. Geertruyt Philips van Schuylder (1603–1651)
  - David Pieterse Schuyler (1636–1690) m. Catharina Verplanck (1639–1690), daughter of Abraham Isaacsen Verplanck (1606–1690); the couple died during the Schenectady massacre of 1690
    - Myndert Schuyler (1672–1755), Mayor of Albany, m. Rachel Cuyler (1674–1747), sister of Johannes Cuyler (1661-1740)
      - Anna Schuyler (1697–1750) m. Johannes De Peyster III (1694–1789), Mayor of Albany and son of Johannes de Peyster
        - Anna de Peyster (1723–1794), m. Volkert Petrus Douw (1720–1801), New York State Senator, Mayor of Albany, grandson of Hendrick van Rensselaer
          - John De Peyster Douw (1756-1835), m. 1) Deborah Beekman (1763–1791), daughter of Johannes Jacobse Beekman; 2) Margaret Livingston (1768–1802), daughter of Peter Robert Livingston; 3) Catherine Douw Gansevoort (1782–1848)
    - Pieter Davidse Schuyler (b. 1659) m. Alida Van Slictenhorst
      - David Pieterse Schuyler (1688–1764) m. Anna Bradt
        - Peter David Schuyler (1723–1763) m. Elizabeth Barbara Herkimer, sister of General Nicholas Herkimer (1728–1777) and loyalist Johan Jost Herkimer (1732–1795)
          - Johan Joseph "Hon Yost" Schuyler (1743–1810), militia member and spy during the American Revolution
        - Philip David Schuyler (1730–1777) m. Anna
    - Maria Schuyler (1666–1742) m. Dr. Hendrick van Dyck (1665–1707)
      - David Hendrick Van Dyke (1693–1763) m. Christina Ten Broeck (1694–1750), sister of Dirck Wesselse Ten Broeck (1638–1717)
      - Arent Van Dyck (1700–?) m. Heyetie Van Dyck
      - Lydia Van Dyck (1704–1785) m. Cornelius Van Schaack (1705–1776)
        - Cornelius Van Schaack Jr. (1734–1797) m. Angeltie (Angelica) Yates; brother of Peter van Schaack
          - Maria Helen Van Schaack (1773–1845) m. James Jacobus Roosevelt (1759–1840)
            - Cornelius Van Schaack Roosevelt (1794–1871) m. Margaret Barnhill (1799–1861)
              - Roosevelt family (Oyster Bay)
    - David Davidse Schuyler (1669-1715), Mayor of Albany, m. Elsje Rutgers
    - Jacobus Schuyler (b. 1675)
    - Catharina Schuyler (b. 1678) m. 1) Johannes Abeel (1667–1711), Mayor of Albany; 2) Rutger Jansen Bleecker (1675-1756), Mayor of Albany, son of Jan Jansen Bleecker, brother of Johannes Bleecker Jr.
      - Christoffel Abeel (b. 1696) m. Margueritta Breese (Bries)
        - Johannes Abeel (1722–1794) m. Gah-hon-no-neh
          - Gaiänt'wakê (Cornplanter) John Abeel (1751–1836), Seneca leader
      - Catalina Abeel (b. 1698) m. Vincent Mathews
        - Fletcher Mathews (1725-1799) m. Sarah Woodhull (1726-1791), sister of Nathaniel Woodhull (1722-1776)
          - Sarah Mathews (1760-c. 1785) m. Thomas Beekman
          - Julia Ann (Juliana) Mathews (1765-1811) m. John Evertson of the Great Nine Partners (1762-1795), brother-in-law of Governor John Cotton Smith of Connecticut (1765-1845)
        - David Mathews (1739–1800), Loyalist Mayor of New York during the American Revolution m. Sarah Seymour
          - Catalina Mathews (b. 1759) m. James Lamb, Jr. (b. 1755) of Lamb House, Rye, East Sussex, a British officer
            - Sarah Lamb (b. 1777) m. James Noble (b. 1779), Vice-admiral of the White
              - Edith Elizabeth Noble (1811–1875) m. Rev. William Wollaston Pym (1792–1852), son of Francis Pym (ancestor of the Lord Pym)
                - Horatio Noble Pym (1844–1896), British solicitor, book collector and editor
          - Harriet Mathews (1763–1847) m. Francis Green (1742–1809), son of Benjamin Green
            - Anna Winslow Green m. Samuel Webber (1759–1810), President of Harvard
          - Amelia Mathews (d. 1816) m. 1807: John Corbett Ritchie (1775–1860)
            - Caroline Maria Ritchie (b. 1808) m. 1830: Edmund Murray Dodd (1797–1876)
              - Murray Dodd (1843–1905) m. 1879: Laura Isabel
              - Rosina Uniacke Dodd (d. 1899) m. 1872: Henry Arthur Keith-Murray (b. 1846), son of Sir William Keith-Murray, 7th Baronet
              - Emily Mary Dodd (1832-1908) m. Lewis Johnstone (c. 1827-1899), son of James William Johnston (1792-1873), Premier of Nova Scotia
                - Lewis Wilkieson Johnstone (1862–1936), Member of the House of Commons of Canada m. Annie Brown
        - James Mathews (b. 1742) m. Hannah Strong (b. 1742)
          - Congressman Vincent Mathews (1766-1846)
          - Juliana Strong Mathews (1775–1830) m. Lazarus Hammond (1777–1848), founder of Hammondsport
            - Samuel Haight Hammond (1809–1878) m. Emeline Anne Humphrey (1808–1873), granddaughter of Congressman Reuben Humphrey
          - Sarah Mathews (1778–1830) m. General Samuel S. Haight (1778–1863)
            - Fletcher Mathews Haight (1799–1866), United States federal judge m. Elizabeth Stuart McLachlan (1799–1827)
              - Henry Huntly Haight (1825–1878), tenth Governor of California m. Anna E. Bissell (1834–1898)
      - Cornelia Abeel (b. 1701) m. Goose Van Schaick
        - Anthony Van Schaick, Jr. (b. 1721)
          - Anna Van Schaick (b. 1754)
      - David Abeel (b. 1705)
        - Catharina Abeel (b. 1723)
      - Johannes Rutger Bleecker (1713–1800), m. Elizabeth Staats (1725–1811)
      - Margareta Bleecker (1714–1760), m. Edward Collins (1704–1753), son of Lt. John Collins and Margareta (née Schuyler) Verplanck, widow of Jacobus Verplanck (as above)
      - Jacobus Bleecker (1716-1791), m. Abigail Lispenard (1718–1807), sister of Leonard Lispenard
        - Anthony Lispenard Bleecker (1741-1816), namesake of Bleecker Street, Manhattan, m. Mary Noel
          - Anthony Bleecker (1770-1827)
      - Myndert Bleecker (b. 1720)

== Schuyler Family Association ==
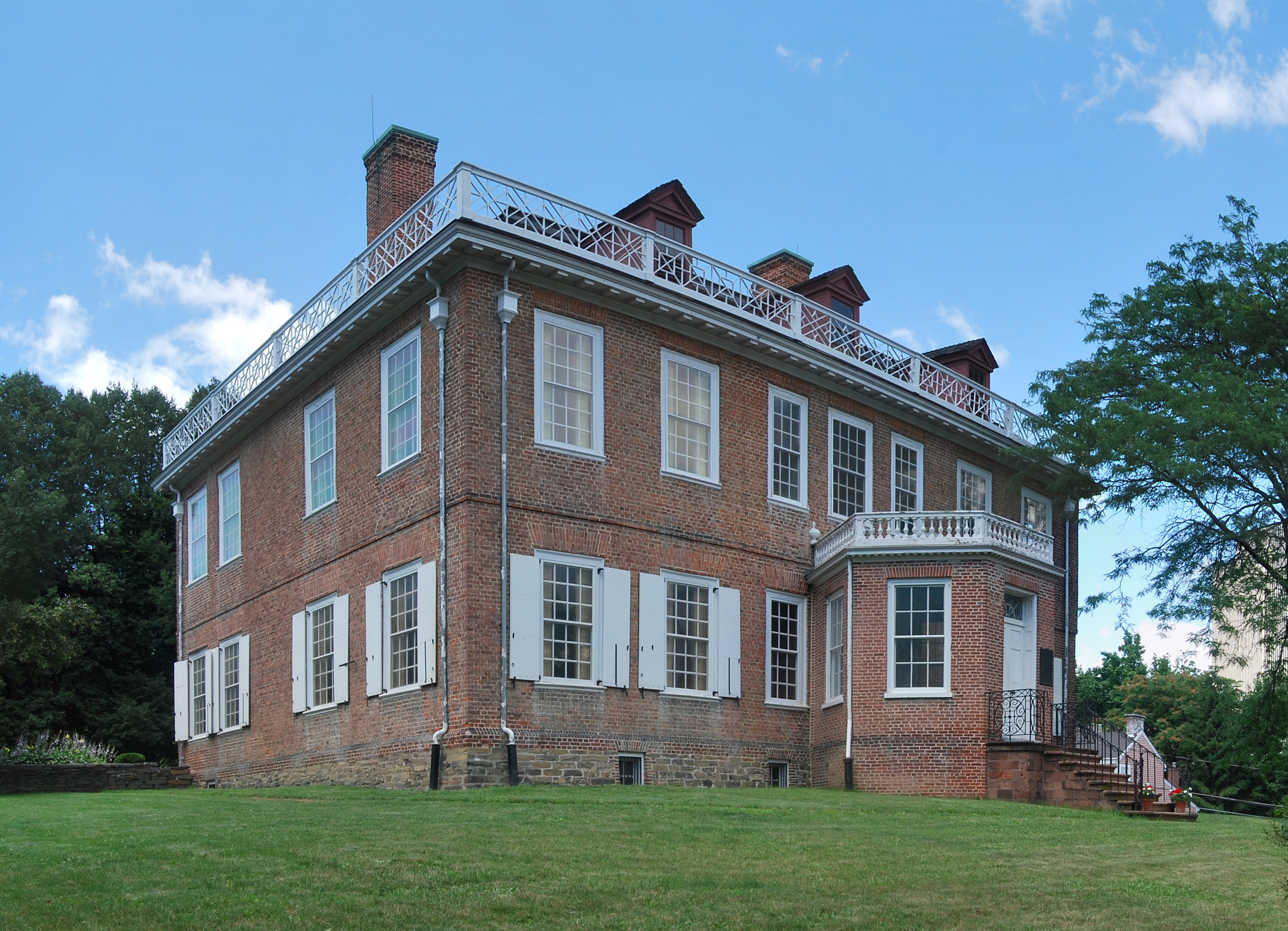
Schuyler Mansion in Albany, built 1761–65 for Philip Schuyler

On 25 March 2020, members of the Schuyler family formed the Schuyler Family Association, with a founding governing board including Charles Neuhauser (chair) and Katherine Rosman. The association periodically publishes items of interest to the family in a newsletter called Kindred.

== See also ==
- The Schuyler Sisters
- Van Rensselaer family
- Van Cortlandt family
- Temple Bowdoin
- Peter Schuyler (New Jersey soldier)
- Schuyler Colfax
- Schuyler Copper Mine
- Schuyler Island

de Peyster family tree
- Johannes de Peyster Sr. (c. 1600–c. 1685)
  - Abraham de Peyster (1657–1728), Mayor of New York City
    - Catherine de Peyster, married Philip Van Cortlandt, son of Stephanus Van Cortlandt
      - Pierre Van Cortlandt (1721–1814)
    - Abraham de Peyster (1696–1767), Treasurer of the Province of New York, married Margaret Van Cortlandt, daughter of Jacobus Van Cortlandt
      - James Abraham de Peyster (1726–1799)
        - Capt. Abraham de Peyster (1753–1798), married Catherine Livingston, granddaughter of Philip Livingston
        - Frederick de Peyster (1758–1834)
          - James Ferguson de Peyster (1794–1874), married (1) Susan Maria Clarkson (1800–1823), daughter of Matthew Clarkson; married (2) Frances Goodhue Ashton (1805–1871)
            - Susan Maria de Peyster (1823–1910), married Robert Edward Livingston (1820–1889)
              - Goodhue Livingston (1867–1951), an architect, married Louisa Robb (1877–1960), daughter of James Hampden Robb
            - Frederic James de Peyster (1839–1905), lawyer, married Augusta McEvers Morris (1851–1911)
          - Frederic de Peyster (1796–1882), lawyer
            - John Watts de Peyster (1821–1907), military officer, married Estelle Livingston
              - John Watts de Peyster Jr. (1841–1873), Union Army officer
              - Johnston de Peyster (1846–1903), New York State Assembly member
    - Pierre Guillaume de Peyster (b. 1707), married Cornelia Schuyler
      - Arent DePeyster (1736–1822), British military officer
      - Pierre Guillaume de Peyster (1745–1807)
        - William Sheriff de Peyster, married Mary Roosevelt, niece of Nicholas Roosevelt
        - Cornelia de Peyster, married Jacob R. Van Rensselaer
  - Johannes de Peyster (1666–1719), Mayor of New York City, married Anna Bancker, sister of Albany mayor Evert Bancker
    - Johannes de Peyster III (1694–1783), married Anna Schuyler, daughter of Albany mayor Myndert Schuyler
      - Anna de Peyster (1723–1794), who married Albany mayor Volkert P. Douw
    - Maria de Peyster, married Gerard Bancker
      - Gerard Bancker (1740–1799), surveyor and politician
    - William de Peyster, married Margaret Roosevelt
      - William de Peyster
        - Elizabeth de Peyster, married Charles Willson Peale (1741–1827), painter
          - Franklin Peale (1795–1870), Philadelphia Mint officer
          - Titian Peale (1799–1885), naturalist
    - Catharina de Peyster, married Hendrick Rutgers (1712–1779)
      - Henry Rutgers (1745–1830), Revolutionary War hero, namesake of Rutgers University
  - Elizabeth de Peyster, married New Jersey provincial Governor John Hamilton
  - Maria de Peyster, married New York City Mayor David Provost
