= Myndert Schuyler =

American trader and merchant

Mayor of Albany, New York
- In office 1723–1725
- Preceded by: Pieter Van Brugh
- Succeeded by: Johannes Cuyler
- In office 1719–1720
- Preceded by: Robert Livingston the Younger
- Succeeded by: Pieter Van Brugh

Personal details
- Born: January 16, 1672 Schuyler Flatts, Province of New York
- Died: October 18, 1755 (aged 83) Albany, Province of New York
- Spouse: Rachel Cuyler (m. 1693; died 1747)
- Children: Anna Schuyler
- Parent(s): David Pieterse Schuyler; Catharina Verplanck
- Relatives: David Davidse Schuyler (brother); Alida Schuyler (cousin); Pieter Schuyler (cousin); Arent Schuyler (cousin); Johannes Schuyler (cousin); Philip P. Schuyler (uncle); Johannes de Peyster (son-in-law)

Myndert Schuyler (January 16, 1672 – October 18, 1755) was a colonial trader and merchant with extensive real estate holdings who served as Mayor of Albany, New York, twice between 1719 and 1725.

== Early life ==
Schuyler was born on January 16, 1672, at the family homestead, Schuyler Flatts (near present-day Menands, New York). He was one of eight children born to his parents, David Pieterse Schuyler (1636–1690), who was born in the Netherlands, and Catharina Verplanck (1639–1690), between 1659 and 1678. Both of his parents died during the Schenectady massacre of 1690. He was the younger brother of David Davidse Schuyler, also a mayor of Albany.

His paternal grandparents were Pieter Tjercks Van Schuylder and Geertruyt Philips and his uncle was Philip Pieterse Schuyler (1628–1683), the prominent colonist landowner. Through his uncle, he was first cousins with Gertruj Schuyler (b. 1654), who married Stephanus van Cortlandt (1643–1700), the patroon of Van Cortlandt Manor and a Mayor of New York City, Alida Schuyler (1656–1727), who married Nicholas van Rensselaer and after his death, Robert Livingston the Elder, Pieter Schuyler (1657–1724), the first mayor of Albany, Arent Schuyler (1662–1730), and Johannes Schuyler.

== Career ==
Schuyler was a prominent merchant and trader who turned his profits into extensive real estate holdings throughout the New York region.

He served the Albany government as a juror, constable, Alderman, and mayor. He also was elected five times to represent Albany in the New York General Assembly, serving from 1701 to 1709, in 1713, from 1716 to 1726, and again in 1728. In addition, he was the Albany County surrogate for many years.

In 1726, Schuyler was appointed and began serving as Mayor of Albany for two non-consecutive times. The first term began in 1719 and he was in office until 1720 when he was succeeded by Pieter Van Brugh, who served from 1720 to 1723. Schuyler succeeded him in 1723 and was in office until 1725 when he was replaced by Johannes Cuyler.

For thirty-five years, the longest of any Commissioner, he served as Commissioner of Indian Affairs for the Province of New York, appointed in 1706, 1710, 1712, 1715, 1728, 1729, 1732, 1734, 1739, 1742, 1745, 1752, and 1754.

== Personal life ==
In December 1693, Schuyler married Rachel Cuyler (1674–1747), the daughter of Hendrick Cuyler and Anna Schepmoes, pioneers of New Netherland, at the New York Reformed Church, New York City. Together, they were the parents of one child:

- Anna Schuyler (1697–1750), who married Johannes de Peyster III (1694–1783). He was the son of Albany Mayor Johannes De Peyster Jr. and grandson of Johannes de Peyster, Sr., the 23rd Mayor of New York City, nephew of Mayor Abraham de Peyster, Maria De Peyster, who was married to Mayor David Provost, and Evert Bancker, the 3rd and 12th Mayor of Albany, New York. His nephews included Gerard Bancker (1740–1799), New York State Treasurer from 1778 to 1798, and Henry Rutgers (1745–1830), namesake of Rutgers College.

Schuyler died on October 18, 1755, and was buried beneath the Albany Dutch church.

=== Descendants ===
He was the grandfather of Anna de Peyster (1723–1794), who married Volkert Petrus Douw (1720–1801), a New York State Senator and Mayor of Albany who was the grandson of Hendrick van Rensselaer, Rachel de Peyster (1728–1794), who married Tobias Coenraedt Ten Eyck (1717–1785), and his namesake, Myndert Schuyler de Peyster (1736–1745), who died young.

Through his granddaughter Anna, he was the great-grandfather of nine children, including John De Peyster Douw (1756–1835), who took part in the Clinton-Sullivan Expedition and also served as Surrogate of Albany County, replacing de Peyster in 1782. Through his granddaughter Rachel, he was also the great-grandfather of Johannes De Peyster Ten Eyck (d. 1798), Myndert Schuyler Ten Eyck (1753–1805), Henry Ten Eyck (b. 1755), and Tobias Ten Eyck (b. 1764).

Political offices
Preceded by Pieter Van Brugh	Mayor of Albany, New York; 1723–1725	Succeeded by Johannes Cuyler
Preceded by Robert Livingston the Younger	Mayor of Albany, New York; 1719–1720	Succeeded by Pieter Van Brugh
