= Philip Verplanck =

Former American politician in New York (1695–1771)

Member of the New York General Assembly for Van Cortlandt Manor
- In office 1737–1764
- Preceded by: None

Sheriff of Albany
- In office September 1722 – September 1723
- Succeeded by: Thomas Williams

Personal details
- Born: June 1695 Albany, Province of New York, British America
- Died: October 13, 1771 (aged 76)
- Spouse: Gertrude Van Cortlandt (after 1718)
- Relations: Gulian Verplanck (grandfather)
- Children: 9
- Parent(s): Samuel Verplanck; Arianntie Bayard Verplanck

Philip Verplanck (June 1695 – October 13, 1771) was an American sheriff and politician in colonial New York.

== Early life ==
Verplanck was born in June 1695 in Albany in the Province of New York. He was the son of Ariaantie "Harriet" (née Bayard) Verplanck and Samuel Verplanck (1669–1698), who was lost at sea in 1698. Reportedly, Pieter Schuyler and Johannes Schuyler were his godfathers.

His paternal grandparents were Gulian Verplanck and Hendrickje (née Wessels) Verplanck. His uncle, Jacobus Verplanck, married Margarita Schuyler (youngest daughter of Philip Pieterse Schuyler) and his aunt, Anna Verplanck, married Andrew Teller. His maternal grandparents were the Rev. Balthazar Bayard (son of Samuel Bayard and Ann Stuyvesant, sister of Peter Stuyvesant, the last Dutch Director-General of New Netherland) and Maritje Loockermans.

== Career ==
In 1722, Verplanck, a surveyor, was appointed Sheriff of Albany by the Governor William Burnet, holding office for a year until he was replaced by former sheriff Thomas Williams in September 1723.

By 1730, Verplanck controlled a manor estate and was the land agent for the Van Cortlandt family, ordering a survey of the manor in 1734. Reportedly, acting according to a directive established by Stephanus Van Cortlandt, he partitioned the manor into 40 tracts. Eight family estates were formed within the manor and individual Van Cortlandt family members sold or leased to farmers. According to the manor grant of 1697, the landlord could send a representative to the legislature, but that was not exercised until 1734 when Verplanck was elected to represent the Van Cortlandt Manor in the New York General Assembly. He served in that body until 1768 while living on the Manor, he was prominent in provincial affairs. In the 1750s, however, his wife's cousin, Pierre Van Cortlandt, superseded Verplanck and took charge of the manor lands. In March 1762, he was made co-executor of the estate of his cousin, David Verplanck of Beeren Island in the Manor of Rensselaerswyck.

== Personal life ==
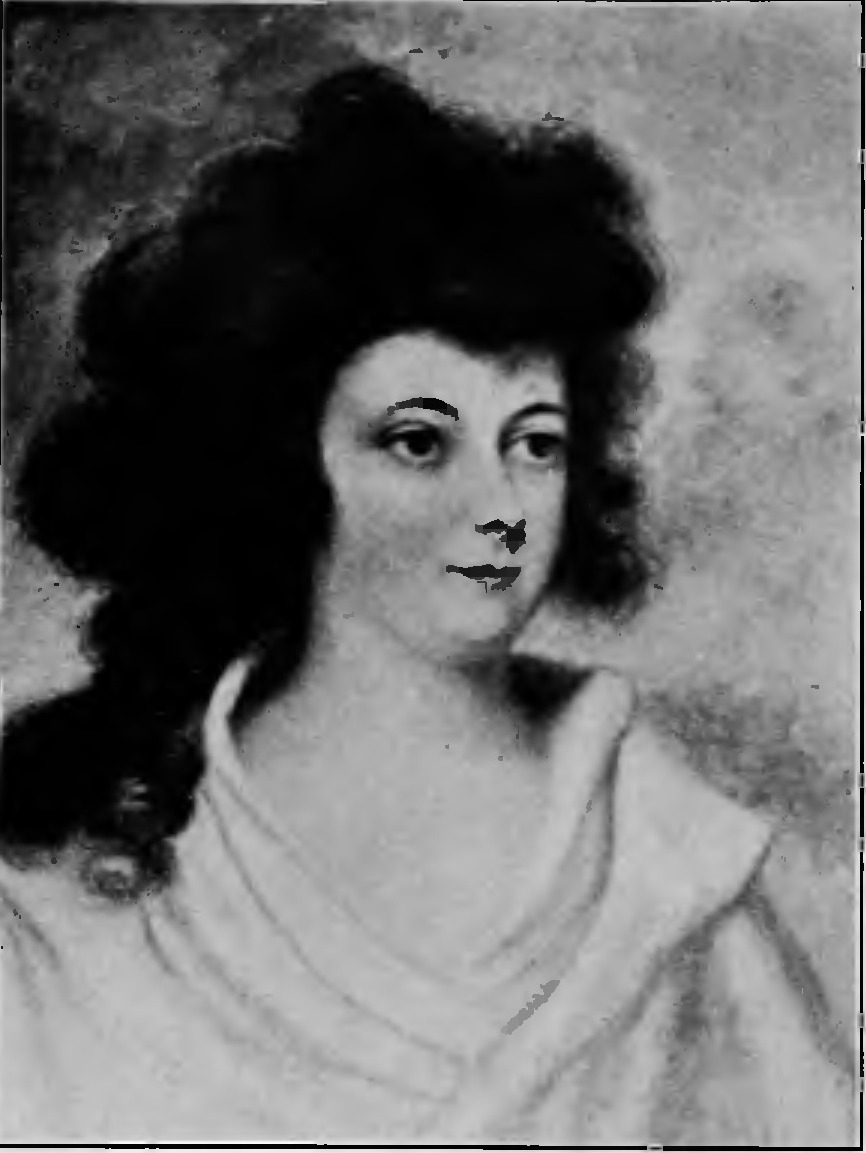
His granddaughter, Anna Maria (née Verplanck) Deveaux

In April 1718, Philip married Gertrude Van Cortlandt, the only daughter of Anna Maria (née Van Schaick) Van Cortlandt and Johannes Van Cortlandt (son of Stephanus Van Cortlandt and Gertrude Schuyler Van Cortlandt). Gertrude eventually inherited a portion of the Van Cortlandt Manor in Westchester. Together, they were the parents of nine children, including:

- Anna Maria Verplanck (1719–1726), who died young.
- Jacobus "James" Verplanck (1721–1774)
- Johannes Verplanck (1723–1724), who died young.
- Margret Verplanck (1725–1767)
- Johannes "John" Verplanck (1727–1774)
- Anna Maria Verplanck (1729–1779)
- Gertruy Verplanck (1731–1794)
- Catherine Verplanck (1734–1804)
- Philip Verplanck (1736–1777), who married Aefje "Eve" Beekman, a daughter of Gerardus Beekman (son of Gov. Gerardus Beekman) and Catharine (née Provost) Beekman (niece of Mayor David Provost), in 1736.

Verplanck died on October 13, 1771.

=== Descendants ===
Through his son Philip, he was a grandfather of Anna Maria Verplanck (1773–1816), who married Col. Andrew Deveaux, the Loyalist from South Carolina who is most famous for his recapture of the Bahamas in 1783.
