= David Davidse Schuyler =

Mayor of Albany, New York from 1706 to 1707

Mayor of Albany, New York
- In office 1706–1707
- Preceded by: Johannes Schuyler
- Succeeded by: Evert Bancker

Personal details
- Born: June 11, 1669 Schuyler Flatts, Province of New York
- Died: December 16, 1715 (aged 46) Albany, Province of New York
- Spouse: Elsje Rutgers (m. 1694)
- Children: 6
- Parent(s): David Pieterse Schuyler; Catharina Verplanck
- Relatives: Myndert Schuyler (brother); Alida Schuyler (cousin); Pieter Schuyler (cousin); Arent Schuyler (cousin); Johannes Schuyler (cousin); Philip P. Schuyler (uncle)

David Davidse Schuyler (June 11, 1669 – December 16, 1715) was a colonial fur trader who was mayor of Albany, New York, from 1706 to 1707.

== Early life ==
Schuyler was born on January 16, 1672, at the family homestead, Schuyler Flatts (near present-day Menands, New York). He was the third son of eight children born to his parents, David Pieterse Schuyler (1636–1690), who was born in the Netherlands, and Catharina Verplanck (1639–1690), between 1659 and 1678. Both of his parents died during the Schenectady massacre of 1690. His younger brother was Myndert Schuyler, who was also mayor of Albany.

His paternal grandparents were Pieter Tjercks Van Schuylder and Geertruyt Philips and his uncle was Philip Pieterse Schuyler, the prominent colonist landowner. Through his uncle, he was first cousins with Gertruj Schuyler, who married Stephanus van Cortlandt, the patroon of Van Cortlandt Manor and a Mayor of New York City; Alida Schuyler, who married Nicholas van Rensselaer and after his death, Robert Livingston the Elder; Pieter Schuyler, the first mayor of Albany; Arent Schuyler;, and Johannes Schuyler.

== Career ==
Like others in his family, he became prominent in the fur trade. In 1697, he was elected Assistant Alderman. In 1699, he was elected Alderman representing the First Ward, serving for many years. He was considered an active member of the council and often was sent to Canada on official Albany business.

In 1705, Schuyler was appointed both the Sheriff of Albany, city and county, which roles he served for a year.

In 1706, he was appointed and began serving as Mayor of Albany, succeeding Johannes Schuyler. In February 1707, he secured Soquon's deed to the "Schaahtecogue Tract 2 by 2 by 12 by 14 miles in extent". After a year, he was succeeded by Evert Bancker, who had previously been mayor.

== Personal life ==
In 1694, Schuyler married Elsje "Elsie" Rutgers (1674–1752), the daughter of Harmanus and Catrina (née de Hooges) Rutgers, a prominent New York merchant. Her maternal grandparents were Eva Albertse Bratt, daughter of Albert Andriessen Bratt, and Anthony de Hooges (1620-1655), the secretary of the colony of Rensselaerswyck. Together, they were the parents of six children:

- Catrina Schuyler (1694–1775), who married Igenas Engines Du Mont (1701–1737).
- David Schuyler (1697–1764)
- Harmanus Schuyler (1700–1748), who married Jannetje Bancker (1701–1757), daughter of Evert Bancker.
- Myndert Schuyler (1711–1772/3)
- Anthony Schuyler (1715–1775), who married Rachel Van Buren (b. 1717), daughter of Tobias Martens Van Buren.

Schuyler died on December 16, 1715, at the age of f46. His widow, who had to care for six young children, remarried to the older Reverend Petrus Vas (d. 1756), pastor of the Kingston Dutch Church, in 1772.

== See also ==
- Schuyler family

Political offices
Preceded by Johannes Schuyler	Mayor of Albany, New York; 1706–1707	Succeeded by Evert Bancker
