= Catharina Verplanck =

Daughter of Abraham Isaacsen Verplanck and wife of David Pieterse Schuyler

- Born: Callyntje Verplanck; February 1639; New Amsterdam
- Died: 8 October 1708 (aged 69); Albany
- Spouse: David Pieterse Schuyler (m. 1657; died 1690)
- Children: 8
- Parent(s): Abraham Isaacsen Verplanck; Maria de la Vigne
- Relatives: Gulian Verplanck (brother)

Catharina Verplanck, also known as Callyntje Verplanck, Catalina Verplanck, or Catharina Schuyler (February 1639 – 8 October 1708) was the daughter of Verplanck family progenitor and land developer Abraham Isaacsen Verplanck and wife of David Pieterse Schuyler who was a progenitor of the Schuyler family.

== Early life ==
Verplanck was born in February 1639 to New Netherland pioneers Abraham Isaacsen Verplanck and Maria de la Vigne. Her father was Dutch-born and her mother was French-born. Her siblings were Abigael Van Lear, Gulian, Isaac, Susanna, Jacomyntjie, Ariantje, Hillegondt, Isaac. The first Isaac lived and died in 1641, and his younger brother was born 10 years after his death in 1651 and lived to 1729.

== Marriage and children ==
Verplanck was married to newly arrived David Pieterse Schuyler in 1657 at the New Amsterdam Dutch Church. They had 8 children between 1659 and 1678. Their children included Myndert Schuyler, who was Mayor of Albany and David Davidse Schuyler who was a fur trader as well as a Mayor of Albany.

- Peter Schuyler (1659–1696), a Judge who married Alyda van Slichtenhorst, niece of Margaretta Schuyler (wife of Philip Pieterse Schuyler); they had seven children before his death at the young age of 36.
- Catylyn Schuyler (b. 1659), who married Johannes Abeel; grandmother of Loyalist New York City Mayor David Mathews and the great-grandmother of Seneca Chief Cornplanter.
- Geertruyt Schuyler (b. 1661), who grew up in Albany and married Willem Nicolasz Groesbeck in 1684; they had six children.
- Abraham Davidse Schuyler (1663–1726), who represented his fathers trading interests in the Indian Country; he married Geertruy ten Broeck, the daughter of Major Dirck Wesselse ten Broeck who was Mayor of Albany (two of Geertruy's brothers married daughters of Hendrick van Rensselaer), and had five children. Abraham lived with the Seneca people for a while, but when his father died, he returned to Albany to take care of the business. In 1709, he and his cousin Pieter Schuyler (great uncle to Gen. Phillip John Schuyler) as well as four Mohawk chiefs went to see Queen Anne.
- Maria Schuyler (1666–1742), who married Dr. Hendrick van Dyck and had four children.
- David Davidse Schuyler (1669–1715), who was born at Schuyler Flatts; he married Elsje Rutgers, the great-granddaughter of Albert Andriessen Bratt, and had six children.
- Myndert Schuyler (1672–1755), who served the Albany government as a juror, constable, Alderman, and mayor; he married Rachel Cuyler and they had one child named Anna, who married Johannes de Peyster III.
- Jacob Davidtse Schuyler (1675–1707), who served the community as a constable for the third and as a firemaster and juror. In 1702, his third ward property was taxed at a rate comparable to a moderately successful merchant; he married Catharina Wendell. After her death, he married Susanna Wendell and they had two children before his death in 1707 at the age of 31.

Catharina died in Albany on 8 October 1708.

=== Descendants ===
Her second great-granddaughter, Maria Helen Roosevelt was the second great-grandmother of First Lady Eleanor Roosevelt. Her great-grandson Johannes Abeel was the father of the Seneca war chief Cornplanter. Some of her other descendants and relatives married into families such as the van Rensselear family and the Roosevelt family.

== See also ==
- Schuyler family
