= Johannes Abeel =

American merchant and public official

2nd and 13th Mayor of Albany, New York
- In office 1709–1710
- Preceded by: Evert Bancker
- Succeeded by: Robert Livingston
- In office 1694–1695
- Preceded by: Pieter Schuyler
- Succeeded by: Evert Bancker

Personal details
- Born: March 23, 1667 Albany, New York
- Died: January 28, 1711 (aged 43) Albany, New York
- Citizenship: Great Britain
- Spouse: Catalina Schuyler (m. 1694)
- Children: 5
- Relatives: David Mathews (grandson); Cornplanter Abeel (great-grandson)
- Occupation: Merchant, public official, mayor

Johannes Abeel (March 23, 1667 – January 28, 1711) was an Albany, New York, merchant and public official. He was the second and thirteenth mayor of Albany.

== Early life ==
Johannes (sometimes written John) was born on March 23, 1667, in Albany, New York, the son of Christopher Janse Abeel (1621–1684), a prosperous merchant and landowner, and Neiltje Jans Croom. He was the third of four children and the only boy born to his parents, who emigrated to New York from Holland in 1647.

Johannes was born shortly after Great Britain assumed control of the former Dutch colony of New Netherland and renamed it as New York in 1664.

== Career ==
After his father died when Abeel was 13, Abeel became a successful trader and merchant in Albany and New York City, establishing relationships with Native American tribes in Western New York that enabled him to acquire furs for resale in Albany. He exported the furs to London and received rum, rice, dry goods, and other items, some of which were for British soldiers garrisoned in Albany and Upstate New York, and most of which he resold at a profit.

Abeel used some of his profits to take part in land purchase, resale and development, including the 1705 Westenhook Patent.

=== Public career ===
Abeel served as assistant alderman for the Third Ward in 1688, and was alderman from 1691 to 1693 and again in 1700. From 1694 to 1695 and 1709 to 1710 Abeel served as mayor of Albany, appointed by the royal governor of New York, per the provisions of the original city charter, issued by Governor Thomas Dongan.

In 1695, 1701, and 1702 Abeel served as a member of the New York Assembly. In 1702 he was appointed judge of the Albany County Court and Albany city recorder (deputy mayor), and in 1705 he accepted appointment as a master in chancery.

== Personal life ==
On April 10, 1694, Abeel married Catalina Schuyler (1678–1747). She was the daughter of David Pieterse Schuyler (1636–1690) and Catharina Verplanck (1639–1690), who both died during the Schenectady massacre of 1690, and the sister of Albany mayors, David Davidse Schuyler (1669–1715) and Myndert Schuyler (1672–1755). They had five children:

- Christoffel Abeel (1696–1771), who married Margueritta Breese (1701–1758) in 1720.
- Catalina Abeel (b. 1698), who married Vincent Matthews.
- Neiltje Abeel (b. 1700)
- David Abeel (1705–1777), who married Mary Duyckinck (1702–1780)
- Jannette Abeel (b. 1705)

Abeel died in Albany on January 28, 1711. He was originally buried in the Second Dutch Reformed Church Cemetery on Beaver Street, one of several downtown burial grounds that had their remains removed to Albany Rural Cemetery in the 1830s. According to a contemporary newspaper account, workmen moving remains at Second Church uncovered his tombstone, which was inscribed "Here lies the body of John Abeel who departed this life ye 28 day of Jan'y. 1711, and in the 44 year of his age." It is not known what subsequently happened to the grave marker.

After his death, his widow remarried to Rutger Janse Bleecker (1675–1756), a son of Jan Jansen Bleecker, both of whom served as mayor of Albany.

=== Descendants ===
Abeel had several descendants serve in prominent clergy roles, including David Abeel and Gustavus Abeel.

Through his eldest daughter Catalina, he was the grandfather of David Mathews (1739–1800), the Mayor of New York City under the British during the American Revolution.

Through his son Christoffel, he was the grandfather of Johannes Abeel (1722–1794), who lived with the Native Americans and had a child with Gah-hon-no-neh, John "Cornplanter" Abeel (1732/6–1836), who became the chief of the Seneca Indians.

Other descendants of Johannes Abeel through his daughter include Murray Dodd (1843–1905) and Lewis Wilkieson Johnstone (1862–1936), both members of the House of Commons of Canada. Through Cornplanter, Abeel's descendants also include Chief Edward Cornplanter (1856–1918) and artists Carrie Cornplanter (1887–1918) and Jesse Cornplanter (1889–1957).

Political offices
Preceded by Evert Bancker	Mayor of Albany, New York; 1709–1710	Succeeded by Robert Livingston the Younger
Preceded by Pieter Schuyler	Mayor of Albany, New York; 1694–1695	Succeeded by Evert Bancker
