= Peter Schuyler (New Jersey soldier) =

American colonist 1710–1762

- Born: Pieter Schuyler; 1707; New Barbadoes Neck, New Jersey
- Died: March 7, 1762 (aged 54–55); Near Newark, New Jersey
- Spouses: Hester Walter; Mary Walter
- Children: 1
- Parent(s): Arent Schuyler; Swantje Van Duyckhuysen
- Relatives: See Schuyler family

Pieter "Peter" Schuyler (1707 – March 7, 1762), a member of the Schuyler family, was a wealthy farmer of Dutch descent from New Barbadoes Neck, now western Hudson County, New Jersey. He was a colonel during King George's War and was captured and exchanged as a prisoner during the French and Indian Wars.

== Early life ==
Peter Schuyler was born in 1707 in New Barbadoes Neck, opposite Belleville, New Jersey. He was the son of Swantje Van Duyckhuysen (1679–1724) and Arent Schuyler (1662–1730) of Rensselaerswyck, now (Albany), New York. He was the grandson of Philip Pieterse Schuyler (1628–1683) and Margarita Van Slichtenhorst (1627–1710) and the nephew of Pieter Schuyler (1657–1724), mayor of Albany.

In 1710, his father purchased a large tract of land along the shores of the Passaic River where large amounts of copper were discovered and mined at the Schuyler Copper Mine. When his father died in 1730, he received 787 acres of land and a large home. He also received one-third of the profits from his father's copper mine.

== Career ==
In order to pump out mines which would fill with water in his father's copper mine, Schuyler arranged for the first steam engine in North America to be built. Schuyler Avenue, which runs along the eastern edge of the ridge honors the early settlement.

=== Military service ===
In 1746, during King George's War, Schuyler, a colonel of militia, raised a detachment of 500 volunteer soldiers to fight in the Jersey Blues. After arriving in Albany in September 1746, the expedition was abandoned and his soldiers complained and threatened to leave. He wrote to the governor in February 1747, asking for a surgeon, medicine, clothing, flints, bread and peas. Governor Hamilton replied in May 1747, complimenting Col. Schuyler for his zeal and offered each man "two speckled shirts and one pair of shoes." As this did little to calm down his men, he paid thousands of his own pounds to still the situation. Later, Schuyler and his detachment were sent to Saratoga to garrison the fort.

In 1754, when the French and Indian Wars began, he was placed in command of the New Jersey forces. They went from Schenectady to Fort Oswego, but returned because of battle losses in New Jersey. In 1755, they returned to Oswego and Fort Ontario, but was captured when Oswego surrendered to the French under the command of General Marquis de Montcalm. Schuyler remained a captive in Montreal until he was paroled in October 1757. Schuyler surrendered to Montcalm in July 1758, and was sent back to Montreal. In November 1758, he was exchanged for Pierre-Jacques Payen de Noyan et de Chavoy, who was the commandant at Fort Frontenac, and paid the ransom for approximately 114 of his former men from captivity in Quebec with his own money.

== Personal life ==
He first married Hester Walter, granddaughter of Robert Walter and daughter of John Walter, a wealthy man from New York City who lived in Hanover Square. Schuyler became even wealthier after his marriage to Walter, who was a business associate of his father. Together they had one daughter:

- Katherine Schuyler (1737–1765), who married Archibald Kennedy, the 11th Earl of Casselis (1736–1794), a Scottish peer who lived in the United States.

After Hester's death, he married her sister, Mary Walter.

=== Death ===
On March 7, 1762, Schuyler died at his home, which was then called Petersborough, on the east bank of the Passaic, a short distance above Newark. As he only had one child, his entire estate passed to his daughter upon his death. She died shortly thereafter in 1765, leaving the entire estate to her husband, Archibald Kennedy, Earl of Casselis, who remarried in 1769 to Anne Watts (1744–1783), the sister of John Watts (1749–1836), both of whom were descendants of the Schuyler family.

== See also ==
- Schuyler family
- Kearny, New Jersey
