= David Schuyler =

David Schuyler may refer to:

- David Pieterse Schuyler (1636–1690), fur trader, alderman of Albany, captain, and merchant
- David Davidse Schuyler (1669–1715), fur trader and mayor of Albany, New York
