= Johannes Schuyler Jr. =

Mayor of Albany, New York

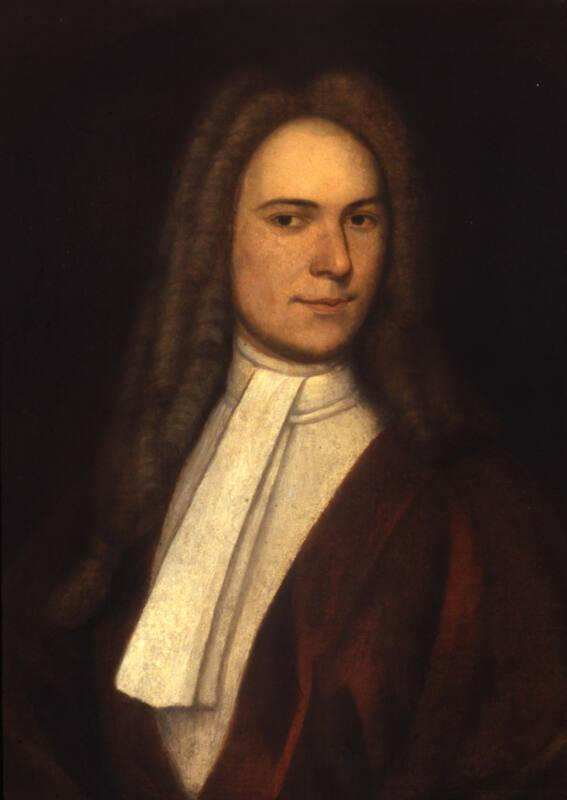

Mayor of Albany, New York
- In office 1740–1741
- Preceded by: Edward Holland
- Succeeded by: Johannes de Peyster III

Personal details
- Born: October 1, 1697 Albany, Province of New York
- Died: November 5, 1741 (aged 44) Albany, Province of New York
- Spouse: Cornelia van Cortlandt (m. 1723)
- Children: 10, including Philip Schuyler
- Relatives: See Schuyler family

Johannes Schuyler Jr. (October 1697 – November 5, 1741) was an American politician and merchant of Dutch ancestry who served as the Mayor of Albany, New York, from 1740 to 1741, and as an alderman and Commissioner of Indian Affairs. Schuyler married Cornelia van Cortlandt. Her family offered a large dowry to Schuyler and a large inheritance. Together, they were the parents of ten children.

== Early life and family ==
Schuyler was born in 1697 in Albany, New York, Province of New York. He was one of four children born to Johannes Schuyler Sr. and Elizabeth (née Staats) Wendell. His father was appointed and served as the 10th Mayor of Albany from 1703 to 1706, and was later a member of the provincial assembly. His mother was a widow when she married his father and already had 11 children from her first husband, Johannes Wendell. His older brother, Philip, was killed during the French and Indian raid on Saratoga in 1745.

Schuyler's maternal grandfather was Maj. Abraham Staats. His paternal grandparents were Philip Pieterse Schuyler, a Dutch-born landowner, and Margarita Van Slichtenhorst. His wife was the daughter of Gertruj Schuyler and Stephanus van Cortlandt, the patroon of Van Cortlandt Manor and a Mayor of New York City. Schuyler's aunt, Alida, was first married to Nicholas van Rensselaer, a clergyman; and then Robert Livingston the Elder, first Lord of Livingston Manor. His uncle, Arent Schuyler, fought in King William's War and later owned a copper mine. Schuyler was the uncle of Abraham Cuyler, the last mayor of colonial Albany (and the third generation in a row to serve in that office).

== Career ==
In 1733, he was a commissary at Oswego and a Commissioner of Indian Affairs for eight years, having been appointed in 1734 and again in 1739. Schuyler was elected alderman of the first ward in 1738 and 1739. In 1739, while a prominent merchant, his father gave him the family farm at the Flats, and he became seen as the head of the Albany Schuyler family. In September 1740, Schuyler was appointed and served as the Mayor of Albany, succeeding Edward Holland. He served from 1740 to 1741 when he was re-nominated, but did not take the oath of allegiance required of officeholders. Therefore, Johannes de Peyster III was appointed Mayor after Schuyler.

== Personal life ==
On October 18, 1723, Schuyler was married to Cornelia Van Cortlandt, the daughter of Stephanus Van Cortlandt. Van Cortlandt was the grandmother of Angelica Schuyler Church and Elizabeth Schuyler Hamilton (who married Alexander Hamilton). Cornelia was born in 1698 to Stephanus van Cortlandt, the 10th and 17th Mayor of New York City, and Gertruj Schuyler, the daughter of Philip Pieterse Schuyler. Philip Pieterse was her grandfather and grandfather in law, making her and her husband first cousins.

With his marriage to Cornelia, Schuyler gained a large dowry and a substantial inheritance from one of the wealthiest families in the Province of New York. Together, they were the parents of ten children. Their son was Philip Schuyler (1733–1804), who married Catherine Van Rensselaer, the daughter of Johannes Van Rensselaer and Engeltie Livingston.

Schuyler died on November 5, 1741, in Albany, leaving his entire estate to his widow as long as she did not remarry. She never remarried, and died 21 years later, at the age of 64, in Albany, New York.

=== Descendants ===
Political offices
Preceded by Edward Holland	Mayor of Albany, New York; 1740–1741	Succeeded by Johannes de Peyster III
