= Margarita Schuyler =

- Born: January 12, 1701
- Died: August 28, 1782 (aged 81); Schuyler Flatts, near Albany, New York
- Burial place: Albany Rural Cemetery
- Other names: Madame Schuyler, Aunt Schuyler
- Known for: Subject of Memoirs of an American Lady by Anne Grant
- Spouse(s): Colonel Philip Schuyler, son of Pieter Schuyler and Maria Van Rensselaer
- Parent(s): Johannes Schuyler and Elsie Staats Wendell Schuyler

Margarita Schuyler (January 12, 1701 – August 28, 1782), known primarily as Madame Schulyer and Aunt Schuyler during her lifetime, daughter of Johannes Schuyler, society leader, and advisor. The wife of Colonel Philip Schuyler, she frequently hosted Native Americans, British soldiers, travelers, and family members. Schuyler was a leader of Albany society and a philanthropist. She had her large barn outfitted and operated as a hospital during the Battle of Ticonderoga in 1777. She did not have children of her own, but she took in children of family members to ensure that they had a good education. She was the subject of Memoirs of an American Lady by Anne McVickar Grant.

== Early life ==
Born January 12, 1701, Margarita Schuyler was the daughter of widow Elsie Staats Wendell Schuyler and Col. Johannes Schuyler (1668–1747), from the large extended family, Schuyler family. Elsie was a widow with eleven children when she married Johannes, who was ten years her junior. Johannes was a fur trader, member of the militia, a businessman, and a politician. From her father, she learned Indian Affairs, military tactics, and politics.

Margarita was one of four children born to Elsie and Johannes, her siblings were Phillip, Johannes, and Catalyntja (wife of Cornelis Cuyler). She grew up on a family farm and a house on State Street in Albany. She later inherited a house on State Street from her father's estate.

== Personal life ==
She married Phillip Schuyler (1695–1758), son of her paternal uncle Pieter Schuyler and Maria Van Rensselaer. They were married in December 1720 at the Albany Dutch Church. They did not have any children. Phillip Schuyler was a "gentleman of distinction and high respectability in the colony". Her husband was known as Colonel Phillipus Schuyler.

== Leader ==
Schuyler became known lovingly as "Aunt" by her extended family (Note: "Every one who could claim the most distant relationship to this amiable woman, and whose years did not render the appellation disrespectful, called her 'aunt'—You may be certain of that, aunt, for their equals are not to be found in this colony.—James Fenimore Cooper") and "Madame Schuyler" for her role in Albany as a matriarchal figure and hostess. She was called "Good Lady, Madame Schuyler" by French Canadian prisoners. Known for her intelligence, common sense, refinement and courtesy, she was said to be the "arbiter of elegance and morals" in Albany. She was also a political and military advisor.

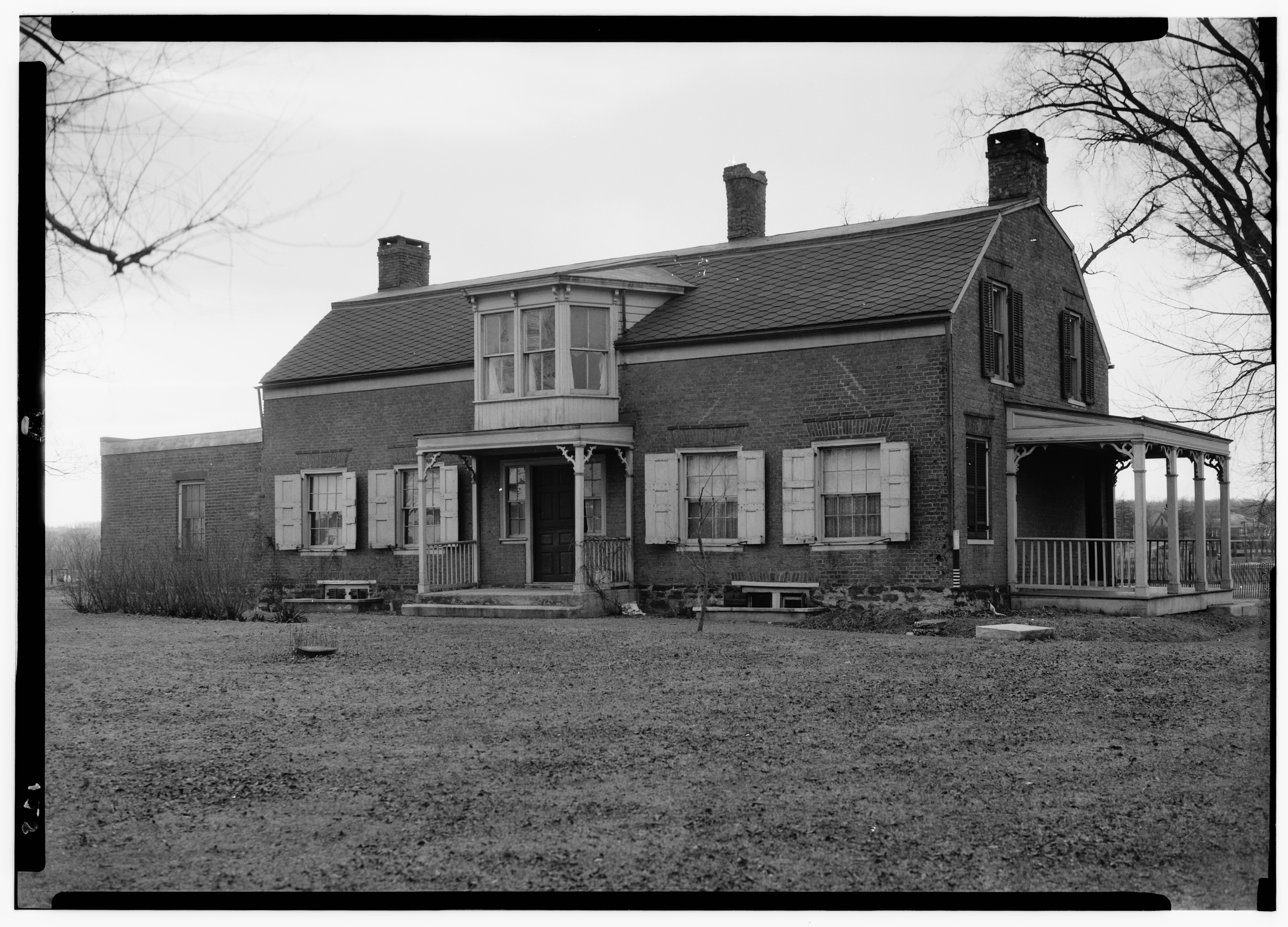
Schuyler Flatts, Troy Road Vicinity, Albany County, New York

The Schuylers lived at Schuyler Flatts, a manor between Troy and Albany along the banks of the Hudson River, that was a retreat for Schuyler family members and travelers, since she had a home large enough to take in guests and there were no hotels at that time. The location, alongside the Hudson and along routes traveling from New England through Kinderhook or Bennington, Vermont, made it a convenient stop for travelers. It was also the "centre of the best society" that Albany could furnish". Leading up to and during war time, she had more guests, while also more involved in tending to a greater number of neighbors in need, so that it was difficult to manage having enough food and provisions. Her pantry was augmented by meat provided by Native Americans who had enjoyed her hospitality.

Schuyler provided hospitality for British officers, including General John Bradstreet who was a friend. (Note: The Schuyler Flatts caught fire in 1863. Bradstreet assigned some of his soldiers to repair the house.) During the French and Indian Wars, Seven Years' War and the American Revolution, Schuyler Flatts was used for staging of the troops, lodging for women and children as their men were at war, and tending to the sick and injured in the large barn that was outfitted as a hospital, where Schuyler and other women could tend to up to 500 soldiers. The hospital was used during the Battle of Ticonderoga in 1777.

Concerned about her continual interest in education, she scheduled time each day to read consequential book and she ensured that "her own flock of nieces and nephews" received a proper education. Although she did not have children of her own, there were always children around her who benefited from lessons provided by Schuyler "in preparation for their future duties in life". After her husband died, she "clung more closely" to the children in her charge. During the throes of war, whose stores of food were taken and as they were besieged by battles and racketeers, she became the spokesperson for the residents. She negotiated a meeting in 1765 with the family members near and far and Native Americans for the release of children taken during war while their parents worked in the fields or had been orphaned. The mothers reunited with their children were joyful, while the Native American mothers who had taken in the children were sorrowful. They were upset to lose the children that they raised, and many believed that the children would not be as happy in their birth family's homes.

== Death and legacy ==
Phillip died on February 16, 1758. Schuyler died on August 28, 1782, at Schuyler Flatts. They were originally interred at a burial plot at Schuyler Flatts and were later reinterred at Albany Rural Cemetery.

She was the subject of Memoirs of an American Lady by Anne McVickar Grant and "The Aunt Schuyler House" in The Annals of Albany.
