= Gulian Verplanck (merchant) =

American colonial merchant

Gulian Verplanck (also known as Gulyne, Galyna and Geleyn; 1637–1684) was a colonial American fur trader and merchant in New York.

== Early life ==
He was the eldest son of Abraham Isaacsen Verplanck, was a merchant, fur trader, and purchaser of a 1/3rd interest in what became the sprawling Rombout Patent in the southeast of the then Province of New York. His younger sister, Catharina Verplanck, was the wife of David Pieterse Schuyler, the Dutch born fur trader who became an Alderman of Albany.

== Career ==
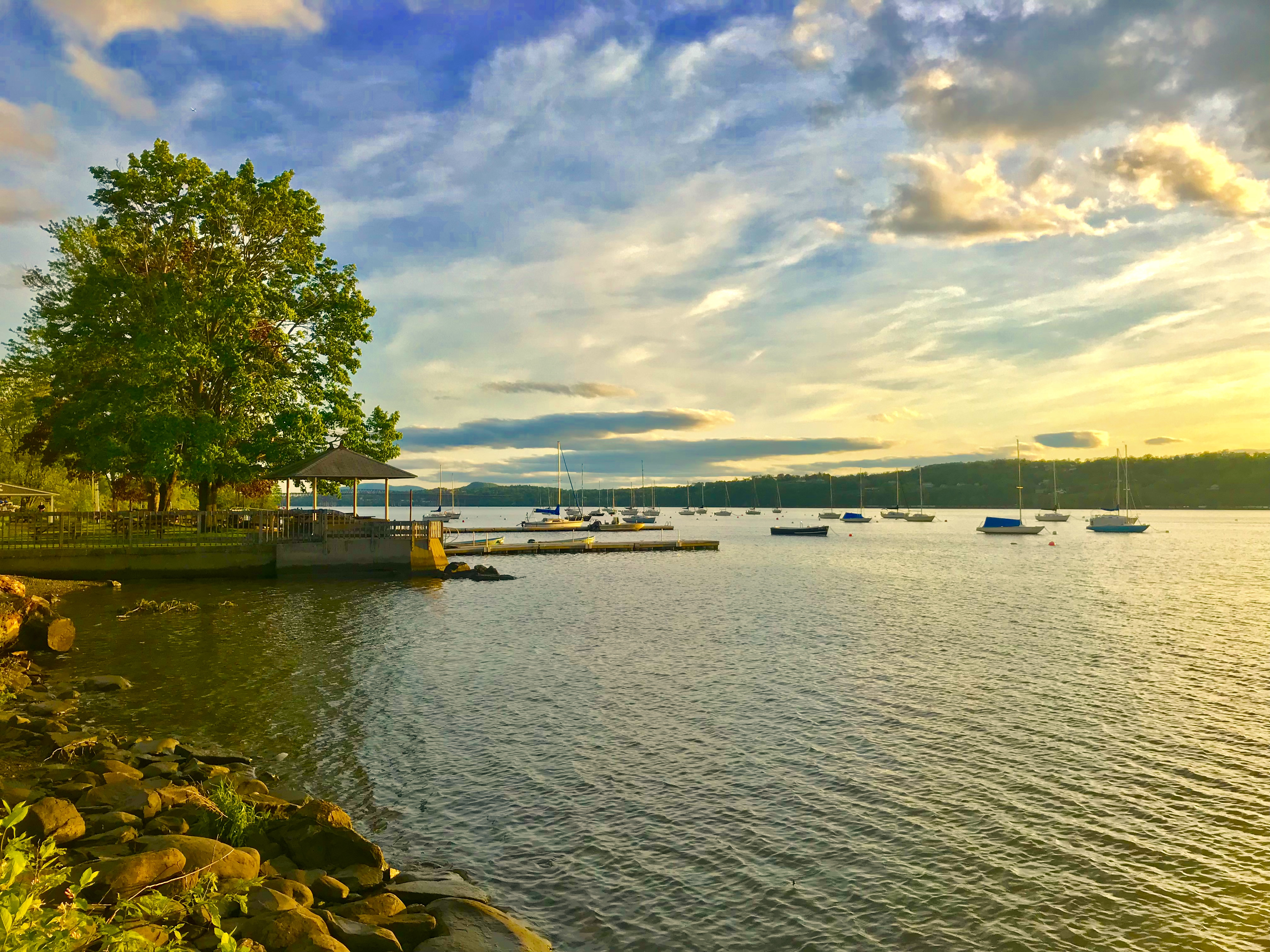
The Hudson River shore of the Rombout Patent in the town of Wappinger, New York

In 1685, King James II of England issued a royal grant for some 85,000 acres (340 km^{2}) of land to Verplanck and partners Francis Rombouts, and Stephanus Van Cortlandt (both former mayors of New York City) they had purchased from Wappinger Indians on the east bank of the Hudson River in what is today's southern Dutchess County, New York.

== Personal life ==
Verplanck was married to Hendrikja Wessels (also known as "Henrica"). Together, they were the parents of:

- Samuel Verplanck (1669–1698), who married Ariaantie "Harriet" Bayard, a daughter of Rev. Balthazar Bayard.
- Jacobus Verplanck (1671–1699), who married his first cousin, Margarita Schuyler, the youngest daughter of Philip Pieterse Schuyler.
- Abraham Verplanck (b. 1674)
- Anna Verplanck (b. 1680), who married merchant Andries "Andrew" Teller, a son of Andries Teller and Sophia (née Van Cortlandt) Teller.

Verplanck died in 1684. After his death, his widow Henrica married Jacobus Kip, grandson of Hendrick Hendricksen Kip, and the family's share of the patent passed down through that line.

=== Descendants ===
Through his son Jacobus, he was a grandfather of Philip Verplanck (1695–1771), who married Gertrude Van Cortlandt, a granddaughter of Stephanus Van Cortlandt.

== See also ==
- Philipse Patent
