= Gulian Verplanck =

Gulian Verplanck may refer to:

- Gulian Verplanck (merchant), Dutch-American fur trader
- Gulian Verplanck (speaker) (1751–1799), colonial American banker and politician who served as Speaker of the New York General Assembly.
- Gulian C. Verplanck (1786–1870), American attorney, politician, and writer
