= David Pieterse Schuyler =

- Born: David Pieterse Schuyler; 12 February 1636; Amsterdam, the Dutch Republic
- Died: 9 February 1690 (aged 53); Schenectady, New York, British America
- Spouse: Catharina Verplanck
- Children: 8, including Myndert Schuyler and David Davidse Schuyler
- Relatives: Schuyler family

David Pieterse Schuyler was a Dutch-born member of the Schuyler family. He was a fur trader, Alderman of Albany, captain, and merchant.

== Early life ==
Schuyler was born in the Republic of the Seven United Provinces, in 1636 as the son of Pieter Tjercks (no family name) and Geertruyt Philips Van Schuylder. His brother was Philip Pieterse Schuyler, the ancestor of the descendants of founding father Alexander Hamilton with his wife Elizabeth Schuyler Hamilton, several members of the van Cortlandt, van Rensselaer and Livingston families.

== Marriage and children ==
Schuyler was married to Catharina Verplanck in 1657 at the New Amsterdam Dutch Church, daughter of Dutch-born Abraham Isaacsen Verplanck and French-born Maria de la Vigne. They had 8 children between 1659 and 1678. David Pieterse Schuyler died before 29 Nov 1692, when his wife was recorded as his widow. His wife Catharina died between 1699, when she petitioned for an addition of 14 feet to her lot, and 1709, when the lot was occupied by her sons Their children included Myndert Schuyler, who was Mayor of Albany and David Davidse Schuyler who was a fur trader as well as a Mayor of Albany.

- Judge Peter Schuyler was born April 18, 1659. He married Alyda van Slichtenhorst, niece of Margaretta Schuyler, wife of Philip Pieterse Schuyler. They had 7 children. He died on March 7, 1696, aged 36.
- Geertruyt Schuyler was born on September 19, 1661, and grew up in Albany. She married Willem Nicolasz Groesbeck in 1684 and had 6 children. She was a regular baptism sponsor at the Albany Dutch Church. In 1688, she was named an heir in the will of her father.
- Abraham Davidse Schuyler was born August 16, 1663. He married Geertruy ten Broeck, the daughter of Major Dirck Wesselse ten Broeck who was Mayor of Albany. Two of Geertruy's brothers married daughters of Hendrick van Rensselaer. He represented his fathers trading interests in the Indian Country. They had five children. He lived with the Seneca people for a while, but when his father died he returned to Albany to take care of the business. In 1709, he and his cousin Pieter Schuyler (great uncle to General Phillip John Schuyler) as well as 4 Mohawk chiefs went to see Queen Anne. He died on July 6, 1726, after a brief illness in Seneca country.
- Maria Schuyler was born September 29, 1666, in Albany. She married Dr. Hendrick van Dyck and they had four children. She died on June 7, 1742, in Kinderhook, New York.
- David Davidse Schuyler was born June 11, 1669, at Schuyler Flatts. He married Elsje Rutgers, the great granddaughter of Albert Andriessen Bratt. They had six children.
- Myndert Schuyler was born January 16, 1672. He married Rachel Cuyler and they had one child named Anna, who married Johannes de Peyster III. He served the Albany government as a juror, constable, Alderman, and mayor.
- Jacob Davidtse Schuyler was born June 14, 1675. He was married to Catharina Wendell. She died, so he remarried Susanna Wendell and they had two children. Beginning in 1697, he served the community as a constable for the third and as a firemaster and juror. In 1702, his third ward property was taxed at a rate comparable to a moderately successful merchant. He died on March 27, 1707, at the young age of 31.
- Catharina Schuyler was born in 1678. She married Johannes Abeel. After his death she married Rutger Jansen Bleecker. She was the grandmother of Loyalist Mayor of New York David Mathews and great-grandmother of Seneca Chief Cornplanter.

== Descendants ==
His second great-granddaughter, Maria Helen Roosevelt was the second great grandmother of First Lady Eleanor Roosevelt. His great-grandson Johannes Abeel was the father of the Seneca war chief Cornplanter. Some of his other descendants and relatives married into families such as the van Rensselear family and the Roosevelt family.

== See also ==
- Schuyler family
