= Gustavus Abeel =

American religious writer (1801–1887)

Personal life
- Born: June 6, 1801 New York City, US
- Died: September 4, 1887 (aged 86) Stanford, New York, US
- Education: Union College; New Brunswick Theological Seminary; Columbia College

Religious life
- Church: Dutch Reformed Church
- Ordination: 1824

Rev. Gustavus Abeel (June 6, 1801 – September 4, 1887) was an American pastor, missionary and writer. He was pastor of several Dutch Reformed Churches in New York and New Jersey.

== Biography ==
Abeel was born in New York City, June 6, 1801, son of John Nielson Abeel, who was minister of the Arch Street Presbyterian Church in Philadelphia, Pennsylvania and the Collegiate Reformed Protestant Dutch Church in New York, and grandson of Col. James S. Abeel, revolutionary soldier. He was a descendant of Albany, New York Mayor Johannes Abeel.

Abeel graduated from Union College in 1823 and then studied at New Brunswick Theological Seminary. He was ordained in the Classis of Bergen in 1824. In 1826 he became a minister of the Reformed church, and preached for a short time in English Neighborhood and in Belleville, New Jersey, while completing his Doctor of Divinity at Rutgers College. He then removed to Geneva, New York, where in 1829 he was installed, and where he remained until 1844, when he accepted a call to preach at the new second Reformed church. He earned his Doctor of Theology degree at Columbia College in 1842. His last post was in Newark, New Jersey, serving from 1849 to 1864.

He was an active member of the New Jersey Historical Society. Abeel married Mary Jane Nest in 1827. He died at Stanford, New York, September 4, 1887.

== Writings ==
- The Aged Penitent
- The Departed to the Bereaved
- Systematic Benevolence
- A Decennial Sermon, May 6, 1860
- A Eulogy in 1858 for Rev. Dr. James Scott.
