= Hon Yost Schuyler =

American undercover agent (1744–1810)

- Born: Hon Yost Schuyler; 1 January 1744
- Died: 1810 (aged 66)
- Relatives: Schuyler family

Johannes Justus (Hon Yost) Schuyler (1744 – 1810) was a patriot in the American Revolution, a militia member posing as a Tory, who was sent by American General Benedict Arnold to repel the British and Native American forces of Colonel Barry St. Leger and Joseph Brant from their siege of Fort Stanwix following the Battle of Oriskany during the American Revolution.

== Early life ==
Hon Yost was the son of Peter David Schuyler (b.1723) and Elisabeth Barbara Herkimer (b.1726). His parents were married June 9, 1743 in Albany, NY. His mother was the sister of American General Nicholas Herkimer (1728–1777) and loyalist Johan Jost Herkimer (1732–1795). His father was a cousin of American General Philip Schuyler (see Schuyler family). Hon Yost grew up in the Mohawk Valley in the Colony of New York, prior to the American Revolution. Hon Yost's father was a militia officer in the Colonial forces during the Seven Years War, and Mohawk leaders held him in high regard, telling Sir William Johnson in 1756 they were "very desirous of having Peter Schuyler the officer of the Militia to be posted in the Fort as soon as the Regulars were withdrawn." Hon Yost's parents were later said to be poor, but in fact owned about 4000 acres of land when Peter Schuyler died in 1761, which Hon Yost stood to inherit as the eldest son of an eldest son. Between the wars, Hon Yost lived close to his Mohawk and Oneida neighbors, and an Oneida elder who knew him said he spoke their language fluently. Some early historians called Hon Yost dim-witted, coarse or ignorant, a half idiot, a madman, and a lunatic, but others described him as "an American of some wealth and influence" and possessing "no small degree of shrewdness." Whatever the traits of this "singular being," the Haudenosaunee respected him as someone gifted and persuasive, who served with them in war, lived with them in peacetime, and earned their confidence as his father and grandfathers had before him.

== Serving the Patriots ==
Contrary to a popular view that Hon Yost was a Tory, service records in the US National Archives show that Hon Yost (John Jost) Schuyler served in Capt. Jost Dygert's militia regiment in the Revolution and received a final payment for his service on September 27, 1784. He famously used his influence against the British in 1777, when he seems to have infiltrated a group led by Lieutenant Walter N. Butler (Colonel John Butler's son) from St. Leger's army at a meeting of Tories at the home of a Mr. Shoemaker in German Flatts, near Fort Dayton. Butler was sentenced to hang, but eventually escaped. Historians have claimed that Hon Yost Schuyler was also condemned to die, but that was apparently a cover story - the original court martial record shows he was only sentenced to flogging, a sentence that was not carried out. Hon Yost's mother traveled from her home in Little Falls, New York to Fort Dayton where he was being held, presumably around the same time that General Arnold's force arrived to aid in the defense of Fort Stanwix, which had recently been captured and rebuilt by the Americans and renamed Fort Schuyler. Hon Yost's brother Nicholas, who was also a member of the American militia in the same company as Hon Yost, joined them for talks with General Arnold.

Under the impression that Han Yost was condemned to hang, Mrs. Schuyler pleaded with Arnold to spare her son's life; it was suggested that, because of Hon Yost's influence with the Mohawks and Tories, he be sent to Fort Stanwix to alert St. Leger's forces of Arnold's intention to attack, and to greatly exaggerate the number of forces. His mother offered to allow herself to be taken hostage to insure her son's return. Arnold agreed however to take Hon Yost's brother Nicholas to pose as a hostage in her place.

Hon Yost's clothing was hung up and shot to make it look like he had narrowly escaped his capture by the patriots. Then he and an Oneida messenger (Oneidas sided with the Americans during that war) traveled by different routes to the vicinity of Fort Schuyler. Separately they talked up the size of Arnold's army among both Brant's warriors and St. Leger himself. Hon Yost is said to have looked up and pointed to leaves in the trees when asked how many men Arnold had.

The Iroquois with St. Leger were impressed by Hon Yost's tale, especially when other Iroquois messengers arrived with increasing estimates. The British and their allies left the siege through Oneida Lake. Hon Yost followed the British forces a short way and then returned to Fort Dayton. His brother was released, and Hon Yost may or may not have rejoined the Tories for a time. After the war, Hon Yost and his brother Nicholas were given their final payments for their NY militia service on the same day, September 27, 1784. A few months later, the two brothers appear in the records again, for a double wedding at the Dutch Reformed Church in German Flatts, NY. Nicholas married a Herkimer cousin, and Hon Yost married their young uncle's widow Anna Schuyler that day. Hon Yost had not gone off to live with former Tories in Canada after the war as has been suggested.

In fact, after the war Hon Yost lived alongside his Oneida neighbors in the village of Canaseraga. He was interviewed there by Reverend Jeremy Belknap in 1798, and he died nearby at his final home in Canestota NY in 1810. His descendents by at least two marriages still live in the area today. Hon Yost Schuyler may have been one of America's most successful, and most unsung patriot undercover agents.

== See also ==
- Schuyler family
