= John Cochran (physician) =

American physician (1730–1807)

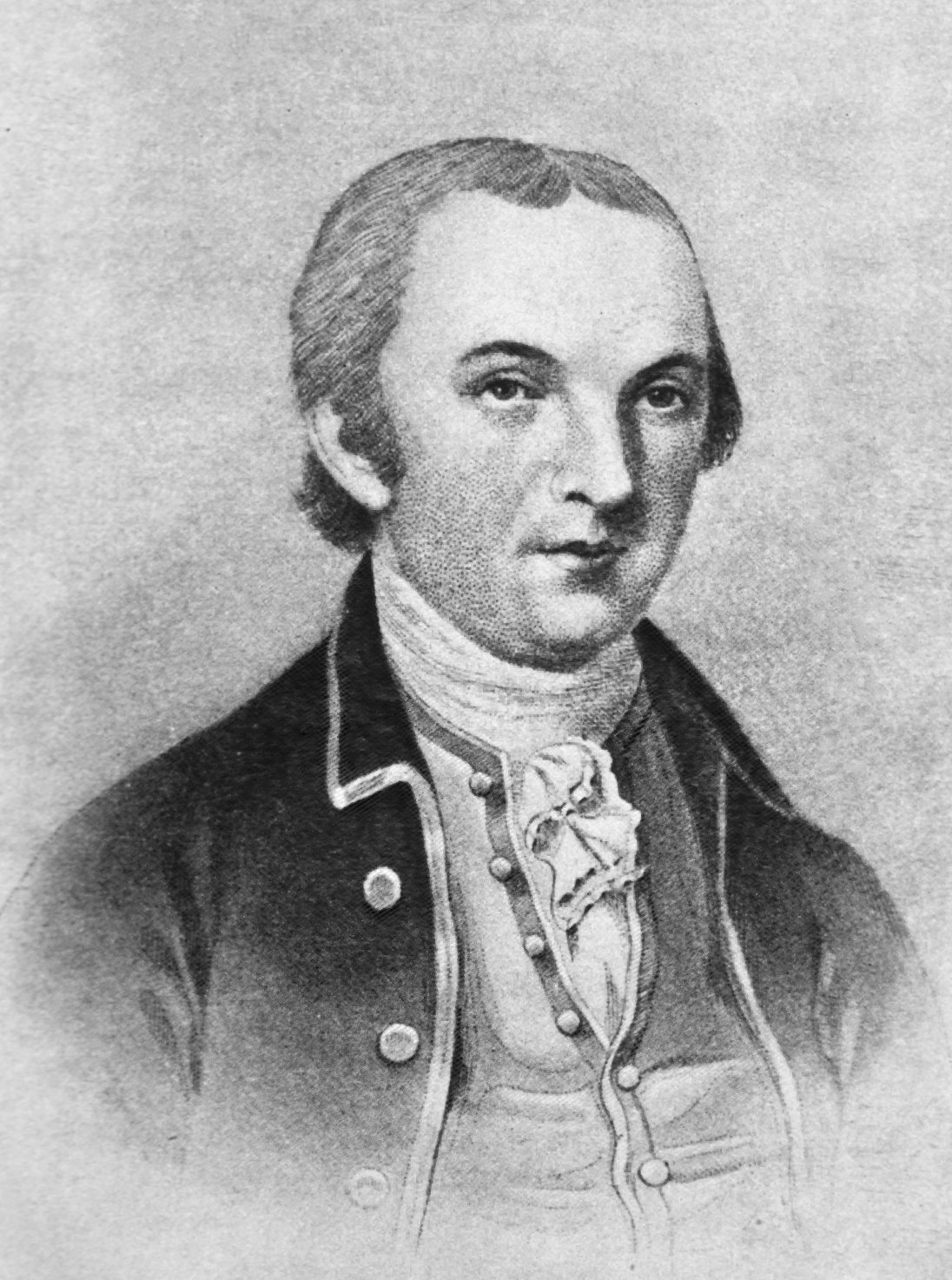

4th Surgeon General of the United States Army
- In office 1781–1783
- Preceded by: William Shippen, Jr.
- Succeeded by: Richard Allison

3rd President of the Medical Society of New Jersey
- In office 1768–1770
- Preceded by: William Burnet
- Succeeded by: Isaac Smith

Personal details
- Born: September 1, 1730 Sadsbury, Pennsylvania, U.S.
- Died: April 6, 1807 (aged 76) Palatine, New York, U.S.
- Resting place: Forest Hill Cemetery; Utica, New York, U.S.
- Spouse: Gertrude Schuyler
- Children: James Cochran

John Cochran (September 1, 1730 – April 6, 1807) was the 4th Surgeon General of the Continental Army during the American Revolution. He was president of the Medical Society of New Jersey from 1769 to 1770, and was re-elected in 1770 and served until 1771.

== Biography ==
Cochran was born in Sadsbury, Chester County, Pennsylvania, on September 1, 1730, the son of Irish immigrants. He served as physician under Lieutenant-Colonel John Bradstreet during his march on Fort Frontenac in 1758. He was president of the Medical Society of New Jersey from 1769 to 1770, and was re-elected in 1770 and served until 1771.

On April 10, 1777, Cochran was made physician and surgeon general of the Middle Department of the Medical Department of the Continental Army. Subsequently, he became physician and surgeon general of the Continental Army and director general of the Hospitals of the United States (January 17, 1781, to 1783). Because of the infighting and other troubles of his three predecessors as surgeon general, he is considered by some military medical historians as the "best of the Revolutionary period chief physicians."

== Personal life ==
Cochran was married to Geertruy "Gertrude" Schuyler (1724–1813), a widow who was the eldest daughter of Cornelia (née Van Cortlandt) Schuyler and Johannes Schuyler Jr., the mayor of Albany from 1740 to 1741. Gertrude was the sister of Gen. Philip Schuyler and the widow Pieter P. Schuyler (1723–1753), her cousin and the grandson of Pieter Schuyler, with whom she had two children (Cornelia, the wife of Walter Livingston and Pieter Jr., the wife of Gertrude Lansing). Together, Gertrude and John were the parents of:

- James Cochran (1769–1848), who married Catherine Van Rensselaer Schuyler (1781–1857), his first cousin and daughter of Philip Schuyler

He died on April 6, 1807, in Palatine, New York.

=== Legacy ===
Cochran's descendants added a final e to the family name. His grandson was Congressman, general, and New York State Attorney General John Cochrane. Cochran is buried at Forest Hill Cemetery in Utica.
