= Johannes Schuyler =

American politician

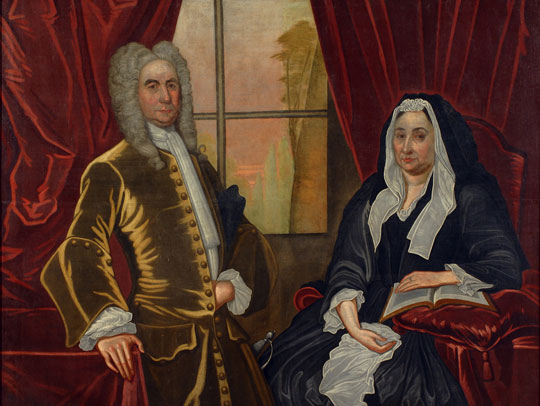
- Johannes Schuyler and his wife

10th Mayor of Albany, New York
- In office 1703–1706
- Preceded by: Albert Janse Ryckman
- Succeeded by: David Davidse Schuyler

Personal details
- Born: October 15, 1668 Albany, Province of New York
- Died: November 5, 1747 (aged 79) Albany, Albany County, Province of New York
- Spouse: Elizabeth Staats Wendell (m. 1695; died 1737)
- Relations: Pieter Schuyler (brother); Arent Schuyler (brother); Stephanus van Cortlandt (brother-in-law); Nicholas van Rensselaer (brother-in-law); Robert Livingston the Elder (brother-in-law); Philip Schuyler (grandson); Abraham Cuyler (grandson)
- Parent(s): Philip Pieterse Schuyler; Margarita Van Slichtenhorst

Johannes Schuyler (October 15, 1668 – November 5, 1747) was a prominent American of Dutch ancestry who served as the 10th Mayor of Albany, New York from 1703 to 1706, and later was a member of the provincial assembly. He was the paternal grandfather of U.S. Senator Philip Schuyler and Mayor Abraham Cuyler.

== Early life and family ==
Coat of Arms of Johannes Schuyler

Johannes Schuyler was born in 1668 in Albany, New York, the son of Philip Pieterse Schuyler (1628–1683) and Margarita Van Slichtenhorst. His father was a Dutch-born landowner who was the progenitor of the American Schuyler family.

He was the youngest of six sons and one of 10 children born to his parents, including Gysbert Schuyler (1652–1664/5), Gertruj Schuyler (b. 1654), who married Stephanus van Cortlandt (1643–1700) (the patroon of Van Cortlandt Manor and a Mayor of New York City from 1677 to 1678 and again from 1686 to 1688), Alida Schuyler (b. 1656), who first married Nicholas van Rensselaer (1636-1678) and then second, Robert Livingston the Elder (1654–1728), Brant Schuyler (1659-1702), who married Cornelia Van Cortlandt, Arent Schuyler (1662–1730), who married Jannetje Teller and later Swantje Van Duyckhuysen, Sybilla Schuyler (b. 1664), Philip Schuyler (b. 1666), and Margritta Schuyler (b. 1672), who married Jacobus Verplanck.

== Career ==
Several English governors used him as an envoy to the Iroquois because as he was well liked and trusted by them. In 1724, Lieutenant Governor William Dummer of Massachusetts appointed him a commissioner to negotiate with the Iroquois. He again visited Canada in 1713 and again in 1725 to seek the return of prisoners.

Later, he became well known and wealthy as a trader and river transport operator. In 1703, he was appointed the 10th Mayor of Albany, serving until 1706, and later as a member of the provincial assembly. He enacted a law mandating that each homeowner had to build an eight-foot sidewalk. Also served as Indian Commissioner, member of Colonial Assembly and alderman. He also served in Albany as a justice of the peace, an alderman, a lieutenant of cavalry.

== Personal life ==
In 1695, he married Elizabeth (née) Staats Wendel (1659–1737), daughter of Abraham Staats (1620–ca. 1694), who was ten years his elder. She had previously been married to Johannes Wendell (1649–1692), who was already the father of her 11 children, including Jacob Wendell (1691–1761). Together, they were the parents of:

- Philip Johannes Schuyler (1695–1745), who was killed during the French and Indian raid on Saratoga on November 28, 1745.
- Johannes Schuyler Jr. (1697–1741), who married Cornelia van Cortlandt (1698–1762), his first cousin.
- Margarita Schuyler (1701–1782), who married Phillipus Schuyler (1696–1758), her first cousin and the son of Schuyler's brother, Pieter
- Catalyntie "Catharina" Schuyler (1704–1758), who married Cornelis Cuyler (1697–1765), the son of Johannes Cuyler (1661–1740)

Schuyler died on November 5, 1747, in Albany.

=== Descendants ===
Through his second son, Johannes Jr., Schuyler was the grandfather of Continental General Philip Schuyler (1733–1804), whose cousin Hester Schuyler who married General William Colfax and were the grandparents of Schuyler Colfax, a Congressman and later Vice President of the United States. Colfax married a niece of Senator Benjamin Franklin Wade and who was related to Justice Oliver Wendell Holmes. His granddaughter, Philip Schuyler's sister, married Dr. John Cochran, the Director General of the Military Hospitals of the Continental Army, and were the grandparents of U.S. General and Congressman John Cochran.

Through his youngest daughter, Catharina, he was also the grandfather of Abraham Cuyler (1742–1810), the last mayor of colonial Albany and the third generation in a row to serve in that office.

Schuyler's sister-in-law, Catherina Van Rensselaer (née Van Brugh) was the great-grandmother of Continental General Peter Gansevoort (1749–1812), who married Catherina Van Schaick, the sister of Continental General Goose Van Schaick. Catherine and Goose were the children of Albany mayor Sybrant Van Schaick. The Gansevoort's were the grandparents of author Herman Melville.

Political offices
Preceded by Albert Janse Ryckman	Mayor of Albany, New York; 1703–1706	Succeeded by David Davidse Schuyler
