= Medical Society of New Jersey =

American professional society

The Medical Society of New Jersey was founded on July 23, 1766. It is the oldest professional society in the United States.

== History ==
It was founded as the New Jersey Medical Society on July 23, 1766, at a meeting in Duff's Tavern, New Brunswick, New Jersey. Seventeen physicians responded to an advertisement in the New York Mercury on June 27, 1766. The advertisement read:

A considerable number of the practitioners of physic and surgery in New Jersey, having agreed to form a society for the advancement of their profession and promotion of the public good, request and invite every gentleman of the profession in the province to attend a meeting at Mr. Duff's, in the city of New Brunswick, on Wednesday, the 23d of July, at which time and place, the Constitution and Regulations of the Society are to be settled and subscribed.

The first elected president was the Reverend Robert McKean (1732–1767), a pastor and physician from Perth Amboy, New Jersey. He served from 1766 to his death in 1767.

== Presidents ==
- 225 – Christopher Gribbin – 2017.
- 001 – Reverend Robert McKean (1732–1767), pastor and physician from Perth Amboy, New Jersey – 1766 to 1767.

== Publications ==
- Journal of the Medical Society of New Jersey
- Transactions of the Medical Society of New Jersey
