= James Cochran (New York politician) =

American politician and lawyer (1769–1848)

Member of the New York State Senate from the Eastern District
- In office July 1, 1813 – June 30, 1817

Member of the U.S. House of Representatives from New York's 10th district
- In office March 4, 1797 – March 3, 1799
- Preceded by: William Cooper
- Succeeded by: William Cooper

Personal details
- Born: February 11, 1769 Albany, Province of New York
- Died: November 7, 1848 (aged 79) Oswego, New York, US
- Party: Federalist
- Spouses: Eleanor P. Barclay (m. 1798, died) Catherine V.R. Schuyler (m. 1822)
- Children: 1
- Parent(s): John Cochran; Gertrude Schuyler
- Education: Columbia College (1788)

Military service
- Allegiance: United States
- Branch/service: U.S. Army
- Rank: Major

James Cochran (February 11, 1769 – November 7, 1848) was an American politician and a member of the United States House of Representatives from New York.

== Early life ==
Cochran was born in Albany, New York, on February 11, 1769, the son of John Cochran (1730–1807) and Gertrude Schuyler (1724–1813). His brother was Walter Livingston Cochran (1771–1857), father of General, congressman, and New York State Attorney General John Cochrane, and his maternal uncle was General Philip Schuyler. He graduated from Columbia College in New York City in 1788.

== Career ==
He studied law, was admitted to the bar, and was commissioned as a major in the Army by President John Adams. He was a regent of the University of the State of New York from 1796 to 1820.

James Cochran was elected as a Federalist to the Fifth Congress, March 4, 1797, to March 3, 1799, succeeding William Cooper, father of James Fenimore Cooper, the author.

He was a member of the New York State Senate from 1814 to 1818. He moved to Oswego, New York, in 1826 and served as the city's postmaster from September 27, 1841, to July 21, 1845. For several years, he was the editor of the Oswego Democratic Gazette.

== Personal life ==
He was first married to Eleanor P. Barclay, granddaughter of John Barclay of Philadelphia, on July 14, 1798. She died young.

In 1822, James Cochran married his first cousin, Catherine Van Rensselaer Schuyler (1781–1857), the youngest daughter of Philip Schuyler and Catharine Van Rensselaer. Catharine Schuyler was the widow of Samuel Bayard Malcolm (1776–1814), with whom she had two sons. Malcolm was a son of William Malcolm and served as Adam's secretary during his presidency. Through this marriage, he was the brother-in-law (and cousins) of Angelica Schuyler (1756–1814) and John Barker Church (1748–1818); Elizabeth Schuyler (1757–1854) and Alexander Hamilton (1755/7–1804); and Margarita "Peggy" Schuyler (1758–1801) and Stephen Van Rensselaer III (1764–1839), 9th Patroon of Rensselaerswyck. Together, Catherine and James were said to have had one child.

Cochran died in Oswego on November 7, 1848, and was interred in Riverside Cemetery. His widow died in August 1857.

U.S. House of Representatives
Preceded by William Cooper	Member of the U.S. House of Representatives from New York's 10th congressional district 1797–1799	Succeeded by William Cooper
