= Arent Schuyler =

American surveyor (1662–1730)

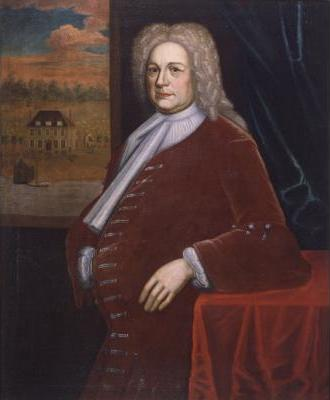
- Born: Arent Philipse Schuyler; June 25, 1662; New Barbadoes Neck, New Jersey
- Died: November 26, 1730 (aged 68); Near Newark, New Jersey
- Spouses: Janneke Teller (m. 1684; died 1703) Swantje Van Duyckhuysen (m. 1703; died 1724) Maria Walter (m. 1724)
- Children: 12, including Pieter Schuyler
- Parent(s): Philip Pieterse Schuyler; Margarita Van Slichtenhorst
- Relatives: See Schuyler family

Arent Philipse Schuyler (June 25, 1662 – November 26, 1730) was a member of the influential Schuyler family (among the first settlers to New Netherland). He was a surveyor, Native American trader, miner, merchant, and land speculator.

== Early life ==
Arent Philipse Schuyler was born on June 25, 1662, in Rensselaerswyck, New York. He was the son of Philip Pieterse Schuyler (1628–1683) and Margarita Van Slichtenhorst (1627–1710) and the younger brother of Pieter Schuyler (1657–1724).

He was one of 10 children born to his parents, including Gysbert Schuyler (1652-1664/5), Gertruj Schuyler (b. 1654), who married Stephanus van Cortlandt (1643–1700) (the patroon of Van Cortlandt Manor and a Mayor of New York City from 1677 to 1678 and again from 1686 to 1688), Alida Schuyler (b. 1656), who first married Nicholas van Rensselaer (1636-1678) and then second, Robert Livingston the Elder (1654–1728), Pieter Schuyler (1657–1724), who married Engeltie Van Schaick and Maria Van Rensselaer, Brant Schuyler (1659-1702), who married Cornelia Van Cortlandt, Sybilla Schuyler (b. 1664), Philip Schuyler (b. 1666), Johannes Schuyler (b. 1668), and Margritta Schuyler (b. 1672), who married Jacobus Verplanck.

The many Schuyler children established the family name and homes, including the Schuyler Mansion in Albany. They were closely related with the great family patroons of New York, the Van Cortlandts.

== Career ==
Schuyler participated in the military actions of an early French and Indian War in Canada in the 1690s. In 1694, Schuyler traveled into north-western New Jersey to investigate rumors that the French were trying to incite the local Lenape population to attack English colonial settlements. Schuyler found no evidence of such rumors, but discovered a rich fertile valley where the Lenape grew a variety of crops. Schuyler reported his findings to his superiors and then convinced Major Anthony Brockholst, Samuel Bayard, Samuel Berry, Hendrick and David Mandeville, George Ryerson and John Mead to invest in the purchase of the land he referred to as the Pompton Valley. The seven chose Schuyler to be negotiator with the Lenape for the rights to the area. Samual Bayard, however, was chosen to negotiate with the East Jersey Company, which maintained land rights over the area that is now Wayne. Approximately 5,000 acres (20 km^{2}) were purchased on November 11, 1695. He built the Schuyler-Colfax House along the Pompton River.

In 1710, he bought a large tract on New Barbadoes Neck. The new purchase (present-day Kearny, North Arlington, and Lyndhurst and Kingsland) had a significant deposit of copper, and the family became wealthy as they started to mine the metal at the Schuyler Copper Mine.

== Personal life ==
Arent Schuyler married three times, first to Jenneke Teller (1662–1703) on November 26, 1684. Together, they had:

- Margareta Schuyler (b. 1685)
- Philip Schuyler (b. 1687), who married Hester Kingsland
- Maria Schuyler (b. 1689), who died young
- Olivia Schuyler
- Judik Schuyler (b. 1692)
- Casparus Schuyler (1695–1754)
- Wilhemus Schuyler (b. 1700), who died young

After her death in 1703, he married Swantje Van Duyckhuysen (1679–1724). With his second wife, he had:

- Pieter Schuyler (1707–1762), who first married Hester Walter, and then second, Mary Walter
- Eva Schuyler (d. 1737), who married Peter Bayard
- Adonijah "Adonis" Schuyler (1708–1763), who married Gertrude Van Rensselaer (b. 1714), daughter of Maria Van Cortlandt and Kiliaen Van Rensselaer (1663–1719), the fifth Patroon and second Lord of the manor of Rensselaerwyck
- John Schuyler (1710–1773), who married Anne Van Rensselaer, sister of Gertrude Van Rensselaer
- Cornelia Schuyler (1715–1785), who married Pierre Guillaume DePeyster (1707–1785)

In 1724, after Swantje's death, he married for the third time, to Maria Walter (1689–1764), the daughter of Robert Walter and Catharine Leisler. They did not have any children.

Schuyler died in Belleville, New Jersey, on November 26, 1730. After his death, his widow, Maria Walter, married Archibald Kennedy (1685–1763), with whom she had five children, including Archibald Kennedy (1736–1794), who would eventually marry Schuyler's granddaughter, Katherine.

=== Descendants ===
Schuyler's son, Peter Schuyler (1710–1762), was responsible for the introduction of the first steam engine assembled in the United States. Schuyler Avenue in Kearny and was named for Peter in honor of the early settlers.

His grandson, Arent Schuyler DePeyster (1736–1822), was a British military officer. His granddaughter, Katherine Schuyler (1737–1765), married Archibald Kennedy, Earl of Casselis, a Scottish peer who lived in the United States, and was the son of his widow, Maria Walter.

== See also ==
- Schuyler family
- Kearny, New Jersey
- Pompton people
