= Van Cortlandt =

Van Cortlandt may refer to:

- Van Cortlandt family, of New York, including a list of people in the family

== Places ==
- Van Cortlandt House Museum, Bronx, New York
- Van Cortlandt Park, Bronx, New York
- Van Cortlandt Park–242nd Street station, a New York City Subway station, served by the 1 train
- Van Cortlandt Manor, Westchester County, New York
- Van Cortlandt Village, a subsection of the Kingsbridge neighborhood, Bronx, New York

== See also ==
- Cortlandt (disambiguation)
- Van Cortlandtville, in Cortlandt, New York
