= Pieter Van Brugh =

American politician

Mayor of Albany
- In office 1721 – 1723
- Preceded by: Myndert Schuyler
- Succeeded by: Myndert Schuyler
- In office 1699 – 1700
- Preceded by: Hendrick Hansen
- Succeeded by: Jan Jansen Bleecker

Personal details
- Born: 1666 New Netherland
- Died: July 1740 (aged 73–74) Province of New York
- Spouse: Sara Cuyler (m. 1688)
- Children: 1
- Parent(s): Johannes Pieterse van Brugh; Catharine Roeloffe Jans
- Relatives: Roeliff Jansen (grandfather); Hendrick van Rensselaer (brother-in-law); Philip Livingston (son-in-law)

Pieter Van Brugh (1666 – July 1740) was the Mayor of Albany, New York from 1699 to 1700 and from 1721 to 1723.

== Early life and family ==
Pieter Van Brugh was a member of the Dutch aristocracy of Albany. Pieter Van Brugh was the oldest son of Johannes Pieterse Van Brugh and Catharina Roeloffs (sometimes shown as Trijntje Roeloffs). His father, Johannes Pieterse van Brugh, had made a fortune by migrating from the Netherlands to New Netherland and exporting furs and other natural resources from Manhattan. Pieter's maternal grandparents were from Norway. Roeliff Jansen (1602–1637) was born in Marstrandsön, a small island situated in Bohuslän province in Norway, today a part of Kungälv Municipality, Västra Götaland County, Sweden. Anneke Jans (later Anneke Jantz Bogardus) (1605–1663) was born on Flekkerøy, an island situated outside the town of Kristiansand, Vest-Agder county, Norway.

His sister, Catharina, married Hendrick van Rensselaer, the son of Rensselaerswyck patroon, Jeremias van Rensselaer.

== Career ==
After serving time as a militia lieutenant in New York City, Van Brugh entered the family business and lived with his wife's family in Albany. He became a constable in 1692 followed by several other public duties in the following years. In 1697, he inherited the Cuyler's home.

In 1699, Van Brugh's prominence led to his appointment as Mayor of Albany which he held until the following year. In September 1700, he was part of an expedition that traveled west into the Iroquois country in an attempt to establish a fort among the Onondaga. In the following decades, he became one of the wealthiest businessmen in Albany and was named mayor for a second time from 1721 to 1723.

== Personal life ==
In November 1688, Van Brugh married Sara Cuyler. Uncharacteristic for the era, the couple had only one child:

- Catharina Van Brugh (born in 1689), who married Philip Livingston (1686–1749), the second lord of Livingston Manor.

By the time he died in 1740, Van Brugh and his wife had twelve grandchildren and had raised several orphaned nieces but had no sons thereby ending the Van Brugh family name in Albany. Van Brugh was one of the last people to be interred beneath Albany Dutch Reformed Church.

=== Descendants ===
Pieter was the great-granduncle of American Revolutionary War soldier, Peter Gansevoort.

== See also ==
- History of Albany, New York

== Related Reading ==
- Bowers, Virginia (1997) Mayors of Albany, 1686-1997 : biographical sketches (Albany, NY: City Club of Albany)
- Zabriskie, George Olin, The Founding Families of New Netherland—The Roelofs and Bogardus Families (de Halve Maen, vol. 48, no. 2, July, 1973, Part IV, p. 9.)

Political offices
Preceded by Myndert Schuyler	Mayor of Albany, New York; 1721–1723	Succeeded by Myndert Schuyler
Preceded by Hendrick Hansen	Mayor of Albany, New York; 1699–1700	Succeeded by Jan Jansen Bleecker
