= Albert Andriessen Bradt =

Norwegian settler

Albert Andriessen Bradt (1607 – June 7, 1686) was one of the earliest Norwegian settlers in New Netherland. In the early records he is often referred to as Albert Noorman ('Norwegian').

== Biography ==
Albert Andriessen Bradt (spelled "Bratt" during his lifetime) was born at Fredrikstad in Østfold, Norway. He moved to Amsterdam, Netherlands at a time when commerce between Norwegian and Dutch merchants was well established. In 1636 he joined a party for New Netherland. In a 1636 agreement between Bradt and Kiliaen van Rensselaer, Bradt is listed as a tobacco planter. In the early records, he is sometimes referred to as "Albert the Noorman".

On October 8, 1636, the twenty-nine year old Bradt, his wife Annetje, and their two children, Barent and Eva, sailed aboard the Wapen Van Rensselaerwyck, arriving in New Amsterdam on March 4, 1637, after a difficult voyage. During the crossing, on Sunday, November 2, 1636, Annetje gave birth to a son they named "Storm". They would later have five more children, Engeltje, Gisseltje, Andries, Jan, and Dirck (or Hendrick).

Their destination was Rensselaerswyck where Bradt worked at a saw mill and a tobacco plantation. Initially, Andriessen was to operate the mill with his partners, but not long after his arrival he took the liberty of dissolving the partnership and established himself as a tobacco planter. After about a year, he and his brother, Arent, began growing tobacco for the patroon and participating in the fur trade. Bradt later operated two large sawmills on a location that later was known as Lower Hollow from the patroon, Van Rensselaer, on a stream winding across south-central Albany County, New York. It empties into the Hudson River after flowing around the west side of Castle Island, and came to be called Normans Kill named after Albert. Normans Kill is the first tributary of the Hudson River south of the city of Albany. He was also a woodcutter, sawyer and fur trader which brought him commercial success. He was one of the elders of the Albany Lutheran Church.

== Marriage ==
Albert married Annatje Barents Van Rolmers/Rotmer (1608-1661) on April 11, 1632 in Oude Kerke, Amsterdam, Netherlands. The bans were made on March 27 of that year. Annatje had German parents, but according to some genealogies was born in Oudenbrath (erroneously thought be in Norway), or Oudenbroeck (currently Altenbruch), Germany. After Anna's death, Albert sold the New Amsterdam property and lived at Norman's Kill. He created a document dated 3 June 1662 whereby he paid all of his children for their shares in all of their mother's estate: Eva (Roeloff) Swartwout, Barent Albertsen, Storm Albertsen, Engeltje (Teunis) Slingerlandt, Gisseltje (Jan) Van Echelen, Andreis Albertsen (minor), Jan Albertsen (minor), and Dirck Albertsen (minor). He then married Pieterje Jans, the widow of his former sawmill partner. After her death in 1667, his third wife was Geertruy Coeymans Vosburgh who was also a widow. This third marriage was unhappy. She filed a court petition for separation and alimony on 13 January 1669, and after a long court battle, they were legally separated "because of strife and differences that hath arisen between them" on 24 October 1670; she received annual alimony of 80 schepels in apples and beavers. In 1672, Albert Andriesen Bradt turned the saw mills over to son Barent Albertsen Bradt. In his old age, Albert Andriesen Bradt's behavior became even worse and his children were ordered to deal with him. Albert Andriesen Bradt lived his last few years with unmarried son Dirck Albertsen Bradt in Albany, NY.

== Children ==
In October 1647, Bradt's eldest daughter Eva married her first husband, Anthony De Hooges (1620-1655), colonial secretary and superintendent of Rensselaerwyck. After the death of her first husband, she married Roeloff Swartwout, the founder of Kingston, New York and Hurley, New York.

Albert's son, Barent, married Susanna Dirkse Mayer in Albany. They had 8 children together, but the marriage suffered from Barent's intemperate behavior which led to several court appearances on battery and assault charges. Barent derived his income from sawing, probably at his father's saw mill. He also found success in real estate as he acquired several parcels and built several houses in Albany. He severed on juries and as firemaster and roadmaster. He also acquired lots at Halfmoon and Schaghticoke.

Albert's third child, Storm Albertse Van Der Zee (of the Sea) was born while en route to the New World. He married Hilletje Lansing about 1666. Growing up on the Normans kill, by the mid-1650s he was trading lumber, furs, and tobacco in New Amsterdam – probably on his father's behalf. In 1662, he obtained a lot and then a house in Beverwyck. Thereafter, he settled in Albany – forming a number of trading partnerships, opening a tavern, and then married Hilletie. He died at the age of 42 after an illness.

Albert's fourth child, Engeltje Bradt, married Teunis Cornelisse Slingerland and had 8 children. Teunis and Engeltje purchased 9874 acres of land from the Indians, this land lies east of the Helderberg Mountains and in the present towns of New Scotland and Bethlehem. This land also includes the villages of Slingerlands on the Delaware and Hudson Railroad. Teunis was appointed commissary by Governor Thomas Dongan in the 1680s.

Albert's fifth child, Geseltje Bradt, married twice. First to Jan van Eschelen who died in 1668 in Albany and second to Hendrick Willemsen.

Albert's sixth child, Andries Albertse Bradt, married twice. First to Neeltje () and second to Conrelia Teunisse van Wie (Veryvay).

Albert's seventh child, Jan Albertse Bradt, married Maria Post who was baptized in 1649 in Recife, Brazil. Maria's parents Adriaen Crijnen Post and Claretje Moockers were from the Hague, Netherlands and lived for a while in the Dutch West India Company's colony in Recife, Brazil. The family sailed for the colony of New Netherland on 30 June 1650. Captain Post led a group in settling the successful colony on Staten Island as he had cultivated friendly relations with the Indians there. The colony was attacked and burned by the Munsee on 15 Sep 1655 as a result of the Peach War. Among the sixty-seven prisoners were Adriaen, Claartje, their five children (Adrian, Maria, Lysbeth, and two unknown children), and two servants of the Post family. Chief Penneckeck sent Adriaen to bargain with Peter Stuyvesant for the prisoners' release that October. Adriaen traveled to and from Manhattan and the Natives' base at Paulus Hook, New Jersey several times before a negotiation was made. Many of the prisoners, including Claartje and the children, were exchanged for ammunition, wampum, and blankets. By van der Capellen's orders, Adriaen and the other survivors returned to Staten Island to build a fort. He gathered the cattle that had survived the attack, butchering some and using others for milk, in an effort to feed his group. By the next spring, Adriaen was too ill to perform his duties. Claartje asked that someone else be appointed agent to van der Capellen and, in April, she petitioned Stuyvesant to keep soldiers on the island. Stuyvesant decided against it since there were so few people there. When Van der Capellen heard of the great havoc made by the Indians in his colony, he instructed Captain Post to gather together the survivors and to erect a fort on the Island and also to keep the people provisioned. This, however, was impracticable, as the Captain with his starving family during the ensuing winter were obliged tocamp out under the bleak sky without any protection or means of defense. The authorities recognized the insurmountable difficulties in the way of protecting the colony, and decided to withdraw the soldiers and abandon him to his fate unless he would remove with his people and his patron's cattle to Long Island. (N.Y. Col. Doc., XIII, 60-1.) The creditors of Van der Capelle, seeing the desperate condition of the colony, he began to harass Post for the payment of the Baron's debts, and suit was brought by Jacob Schellinger and others against him as agent for the Baron for payment of a note; and Janneke Melyn claimed as hers some of the few cattle still in Post's possession. The attempt at colonizing Staten Island by individual enterprise having failed, the Island was purchased by the West India Company, to whom nineteen persons presented a petition, August 22, 1661, for tracts of land on the south side, in order to establish a village, which was allowed by the Company, Captain Post being one of the grantees. (N.Y. Col. Docs., XIII., 206) It is probable, however, that he did not avail himself of the grant, but removed to Bergen (now Jersey City, N.J.) about this time, if, indeed, he was not already a resident there. In 1662, he was one of petitioners to have a clergyman settled at Bergen, and promised to contribute twenty florins therefore yearly. (N.Y. Col Docs MSS XIII, 233.) The family later moved to what is now Bergen, New Jersey, becoming some of the first settlers of the Acquackononk Tract. Adriaen remained active in public life. As an ensign in the Bergen Burgher Guard, he took an oath of allegiance on 22 November 1665. Philip Carteret, the governor of New Jersey, requested Adriaen as an interpreter in a meeting to purchase land from the sachem, Oraton, in May 1666. Adriaen also served on jury at the Admiralty Court at Elizabethtown in May 1671, was elected as a representative of Bergen to the New Jersey General Assembly on 7 June 1673, and became a Lieutenant in Bergen's militia in 1675. Adriaen was buried 18 February 1677 in Bergen, Hudson, New Jersey.

Albert Andriessen Bratt's final child, Dirck Albertse Bradt, was born during the 1640s. He grew up on his father's farm and mill. He seems to not have married but was identified as a householder in Albany in 1679 and participated in real estate and other transactions with his father and other family members. In 1681, he joined with other Albany burghers in petitioning the court regarding the Indian trade. In 1684, his Albany taxes were in arrears. By the early 1680s, Dirck Albertse's aging and irascible father came to live in his Albany home. Dirck Albertse occasionally appeared before the Albany court. But, following the death of his father in 1686, his life in the community's record is best described as marginal. Dirck Albertse Bradt died sometime after 1702 when he was elected constable for Canastigione.

== Primary sources ==
- Biasca, Cynthia Brott (1990) Descendants of Albert & Arent Andriessen Bradt (Henington Publishing Company)
- Christoph, Peter R. (1994) Bradt Family: A Norwegian Family in Colonial America (Higginson Book Company) ISBN 9780832844492
- Wood, Joan Bradt (1999) Journey to a New Land: The Bradt Family in History (J.B. Wood) ISBN 9780968584606

== Other sources ==
- Evjen, John O. (1916) Scandinavian Immigrants in New York, 1630–1664 (Minneapolis, MN: K. C. Holter Publishing Co.)
- Heins, Henry H. (1976) Swan of Albany: A History of the Oldest Congregation of the Lutheran Church in America Albany (Albany, N.Y. First Lutheran Church)
- Editor:Arnold Johan Ferdinand Van Laer (1908) Van Rensselaer Bowier Manuscripts (University of the state of New York)
