= Beverwijck =

Community in New Netherland

Coordinates: 42.6346°N 73.7503°W

Beverwijck (/ˈbɛvərwɪk/ BEV-ər-wik; Dutch: Beverwijck), often written using the pre-reform orthography Beverwyck, was a fur-trading community north of Fort Orange on the Hudson River within Rensselaerwyck in New Netherland that was renamed and developed as Albany, New York, after the English took control of the colony in 1664.

== History ==
During the 1640s, the name Beverwijck began to be used informally by the Dutch for their settlement of fur traders north of the fort. The village of Beverwijck arose out of a jurisdictional dispute between the patroonship of Rensselaerswijck and the Dutch West India Company (WIC) over the legal status of the community of some two hundred colonists living in the vicinity of the WIC Fort Orange on the west bank of the Upper North River. In 1652, Peter Stuyvesant, director general of New Netherland, extended WIC jurisdiction over the settlers who lived near Fort Orange.

In the late 1650s, colonists built a palisade around Beverwijck, and it had become economically and politically successful, with large families living in the community. Despite its isolation on the frontier, a sign of Beverwijck's success was that it was never attacked by Native Americans. The Dutch built a collaborative relationship with both the Algonquian-speaking Mahican of the Hudson Valley and the Iroquoian-speaking Mohawk people to the west through the Mohawk Valley. By 1660, the Dutch relations with these two different Native nations had taken on differing characteristics, reflecting their different patterns of settlement and culture.

A large percentage of the Beverwijck population consisted of Europeans born outside of the Dutch Republic. Despite the ethnically mixed population which included Dutch, Scandinavian, German, and English individuals, institutions transplanted from the Republic gave the town a decisively Dutch character.

The fur trade was very lucrative and, when the village of Schenectady was founded in 1661 beyond Rensselaerwyck, the traders of Beverwijck were successful in getting governor Peter Stuyvesant to declare that they had a monopoly on trade. The settlers in Schenectady were forbidden to trade. This prohibition was affirmed by orders of Governor Nicholls through 1670 and later after the English took over the colony of New Netherland.

Although Beverwijck literally means beaver district, its name might be of different origin than related to the fur trade. It could have been named for the Dutch city of Beverwijk.

== See also ==
- History of Albany, New York
