= Schuyler Flatts =

Archeological site in Colonie, New York

- U.S. National Register of Historic Places
- U.S. National Historic Landmark
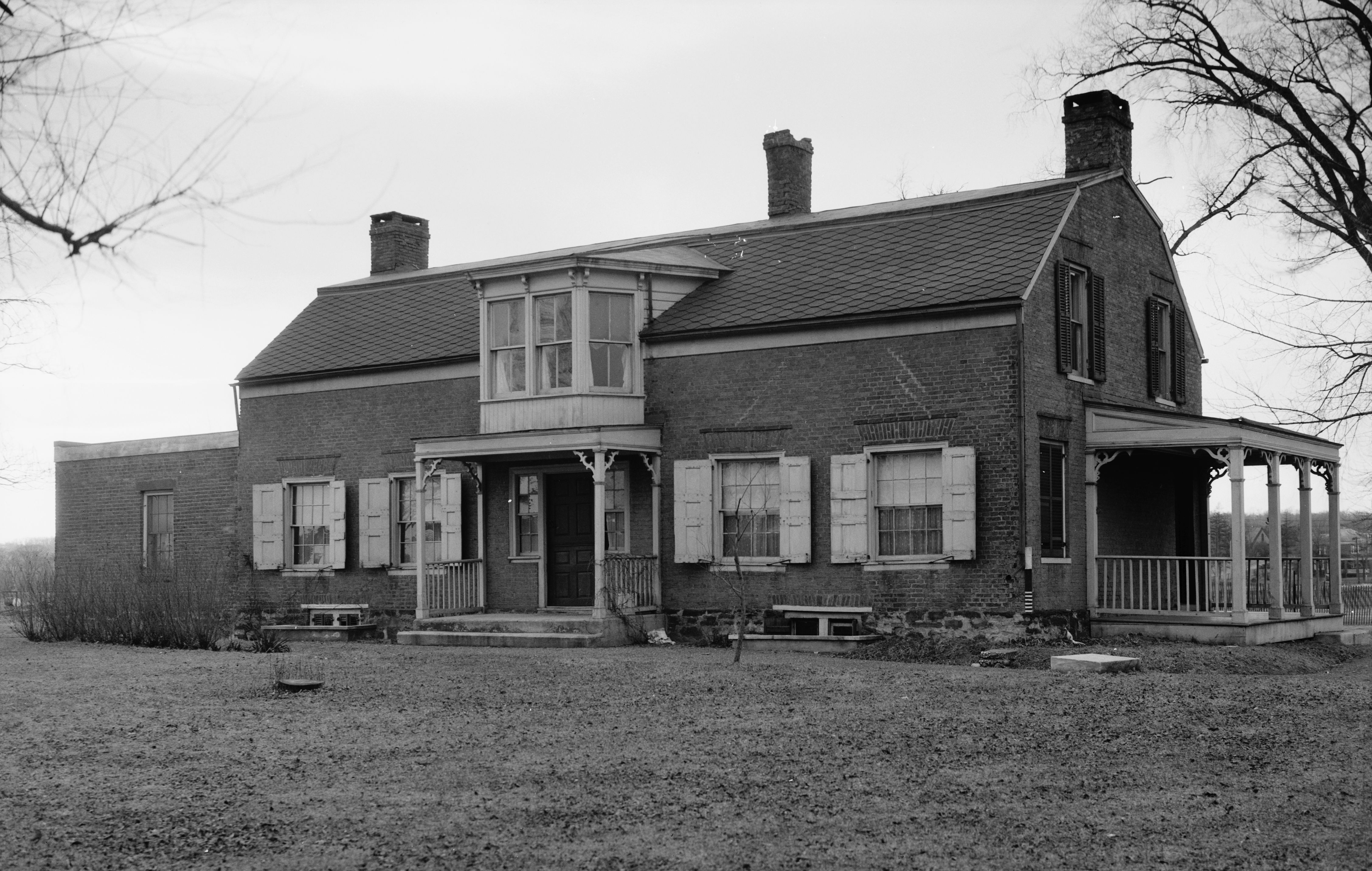
- The Philip Schuyler House, prior to its destruction

- Location within New York Location within the United States
- Location: Between NY 32 and the Hudson River, Colonie, NY
- Coordinates: 42°42′23″N 73°42′29″W
- NRHP reference No.: 74001217

Significant dates
- Added to NRHP: January 21, 1974
- Designated NHL: November 4, 1993

Schuyler Flatts is an important prehistoric and historic settlement site overlooking the Hudson River in Colonie, New York. The site includes evidence of prehistoric Native American, early Dutch colonial settlement, and 18th and 19th-century American use. Because of this rich confluence of archaeological sites, the area was designated a National Historic Landmark in 1993. It is now owned by the town of Colonie, and is known as Schuyler Flatts Cultural Park.

== History ==
The Schuyler Flatts are a rich and fertile floodplain on the western bank of the Hudson River north of Albany, roughly bounded on the west by Broadway (New York State Route 32). Evidence from archaeological digs at the site includes prehistoric hearths and other Native American artifacts. When the Dutch settled New Netherland in the 17th century, this area was first part of the extensive Van Rensselaer land holdings, and was settled by the 1640s, around the same time that Fort Orange was established at present-day Albany. The farm was purchased in 1672 by the Schuyler family, and was occupied by Pieter Schuyler and his descendants into the early 20th century.

From Dutch colonial times, the history includes that of indentured servants and slaves of African descent. The site formerly included the Colonel Phillipus Schuyler House, which burned in 1962. Col. Phillipus Schuyler (b. 1696) was the son of Pieter Schuyler (1657–1724), 1st mayor of Albany and three time acting governor of the Province of New York. His wife, Margarita Schuyler, commonly known as Madame Schuyler, was an influential person within her family, with the British officers, and Native Americans. The Schuyler family occupied the land from 1692 until 1910.

This Schuyler property was cut through by the Erie Canal along its western edge and in the early 19th century the river road which passed in front of the house, to the east, was moved to a location just west of the canal, where it is today known as Broadway. The site became a National Historic Landmark in 1993. The Town of Colonie made the grounds into a park, dedicated in 2002. The park is the site of an annual Civil War Heritage Days encampment.

== See also ==
- Schuyler family
- List of National Historic Landmarks in New York
- National Register of Historic Places listings in Albany County, New York
