= Pieter Schuyler =

British colonial military leader, acting governor of New York (1657–1724)

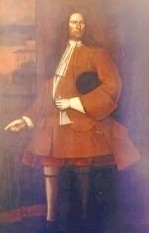
- Painting of Schuyler from between 1710 and 1718

Governor of the Province of New York Acting
- In office 6 May – 9 May 1709
- Monarch: Anne
- Preceded by: Lord Lovelace
- Succeeded by: Richard Ingoldesby
- In office 25 May – 1 June 1709
- Monarch: Anne
- Preceded by: Richard Ingoldesby
- Succeeded by: Richard Ingoldesby
- In office 21 July 1719 – 17 September 1720
- Monarch: George I
- Preceded by: Robert Hunter
- Succeeded by: William Burnet

1st Mayor of Albany, New York
- In office 22 July 1686 – 13 October 1694
- Preceded by: Position established
- Succeeded by: Johannes Abeel

Personal details
- Born: 17 September 1657 Beverwijck, New Netherlands
- Died: 19 February 1724 (aged 66) Albany, Province of New York
- Resting place: Albany Rural Cemetery, Menands
- Spouse(s): Engeltie Van Schaick; Maria Van Rensselaer
- Children: 8
- Parent(s): Philip Pieterse Schuyler; Margarita Van Slichtenhorst
- Relatives: See Schuyler family

Pieter Schuyler (17 September 1657 – 19 February 1724) was the first mayor of Albany, New York. A long-serving member of the executive council of the Province of New York, he acted as governor of the Province of New York on three occasions – twice for brief periods in 1709, after the death of Lord Lovelace, and also from 1719 to 1720, after Robert Hunter left office.

== Early life and family ==
Coat of Arms of Pieter Schuyler

Pieter Schuyler was born in 1657 in Beverwyck, New Netherland. He was one of 10 children born to Philip Pieterse Schuyler, a Dutch- born landowner who was the progenitor of the American Schuyler family, and Margarita Van Slichtenhorst. His siblings were Gysbert Schuyler, Gertruj Schuyler, who married Stephanus van Cortlandt (the patroon of Van Cortlandt Manor and a Mayor of New York City from 1677 to 1678 and again from 1686 to 1688), Alida Schuyler, who first married Nicholas van Rensselaer and then second, Robert Livingston the Elder, Brant Schuyler, who married Cornelia Van Cortlandt, Arent Schuyler, who married Jannetje Teller and later Swantje Van Duyckhuysen, Sybilla Schuyler, Philip Schuyler, Johannes Schuyler, and Margritta Schuyler, who married Jacobus Verplanck.

The many Schuyler children established the family name and homes, including the Schuyler Mansion in Albany. They were closely related to the great family patroons of New York, the Van Cortlandts.

== Career ==
In March 1685, Governor Dongan appointed Pieter Schuyler lieutenant of cavalry in the Albany militia. He later attained the rank of Major, and then Colonel. In 1690, during King William's War, Schuyler's younger brother led an attack on La Prairie, Quebec. Colonel Schuyler led a second attack the following year.

=== First mayor of Albany ===
In April 1685, he was appointed Judge of the Court of Oyer and Terminer. On 22 July 1686, Albany was incorporated as a city, and Pieter Schuyler was named its first mayor, serving for eight years. As mayor, Schuyler was also chairman of the Board of the Commissioners for Indian Affairs.

=== Acting governor of the Province of New York ===
From 1692, Schuyler was a member of the executive council, which was the unelected upper house of New York's colonial legislature. He was the first man from Albany to be appointed to the council. When Lord Lovelace died in May 1709, the lieutenant governor, Richard Ingoldesby, was absent. Under the terms of Lovelace's commission as governor, the executive council's most senior member was next in the line of succession, and Schuyler thus served as acting governor until Ingoldesby's return a few days later. Ingoldesby was again absent later in the month, with Schuyler taking over as governor for another period of less than a week.

In July 1719, when Robert Hunter had his commission as governor revoked, Schuyler was still the most senior member of the executive council, and consequently served a third term as acting governor. The new governor, William Burnet, did not take office until September 1720. Burnet removed Schuyler from the executive council in 1721, along with another Councillor, Adolphus Philipse, who like Schuyler, was a New Netherlander.

== Personal life ==
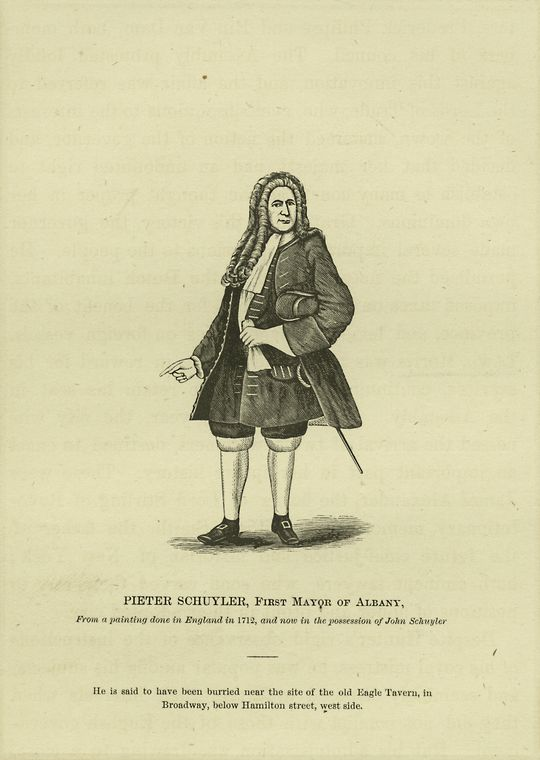
Print of Schuyler

Pieter Schuyler was married twice. His first wife was Engeltie Van Schaick, who died in 1689. Together, they had:

- Margarita Schuyler (born 1682), who married Robert Livingston the Younger
- Philip Schuyler (born 1684), who died young
- Anna Schuyler (born 1686), who died in childhood
- Gertruj Schuyler (born 1689), who died young

After Engeltie's death in 1689, he married Maria Van Rensselaer, daughter of Jeremias van Rensselaer and brother of Hendrick Van Rensselaer. Hendrick's wife and Maria's sister-in-law, Catherina Van Brugh, was the sister of the 6th Mayor of Albany Pieter Van Brugh. Together, Pieter and Maria Van Rensselaer had:

- Maria Margreta Schuyler (born 1692), who married Abraham Staats.
- Gertruj Schuyler (born 1694), who married Johannes Lansing.
- Philip Schuyler (1696–1758), who married Margarita Schuyler, daughter of Pieter's brother, Johannes Schuyler.
- Pieter Schuyler (born 1698), a twin of Jeremiah who married Catherine Groesbeck.
- Jeremiah Schuyler (born 1698), a twin of Pieter who married Susanna Bayeux.

Schuyler died on 19 February 1724, aged 66, in Albany.

=== Descendants ===
Pieter Schuyler third son's granddaughter married Col. Philip Kiliaen van Rensselaer of "Cherry Hill" in Albany, great-grandson of Jeremias Van Rensselaer. His great-nephew was Continental General Philip Schuyler whose cousin Hester Schuyler married General William Colfax, the grandparents of Congressman and Vice President Schuyler Colfax, who married a niece of Senator Benjamin Franklin Wade and who was related to Justice Oliver Wendell Holmes. His grand-niece, Philip Schuyler's sister, married Dr. John Cochran, the Director General of the Military Hospitals of the Continental Army, and were the grandparents of U.S. General and Congressman John Cochran.

His great-grandchildren included Richard Livingston and Col. James Livingston.

Schuyler's sister-in-law, Catherina Van Rensselaer (née Van Brugh) was the great-grandmother of Continental General Peter Gansevoort, who married Catherina Van Schaick, the sister of Continental General Goose Van Schaick. Catherine and Goose were the children of Albany mayor Sybrant Van Schaick. The Gansevoort's were the grandparents of author Herman Melville.

Government offices
Preceded by Lord Lovelace	Governor of the Province of New York (Acting); 1709	Succeeded by Richard Ingoldesby
Preceded by Robert Hunter	Governor of the Province of New York (Acting); 1719–1720	Succeeded by William Burnet
Preceded by Position established	Mayor of Albany, New York; 1686–1694	Succeeded by Johannes Abeel
