= Robert Livingston the Elder =

Scottish-born merchant, slave trader and government official (1654–1728)

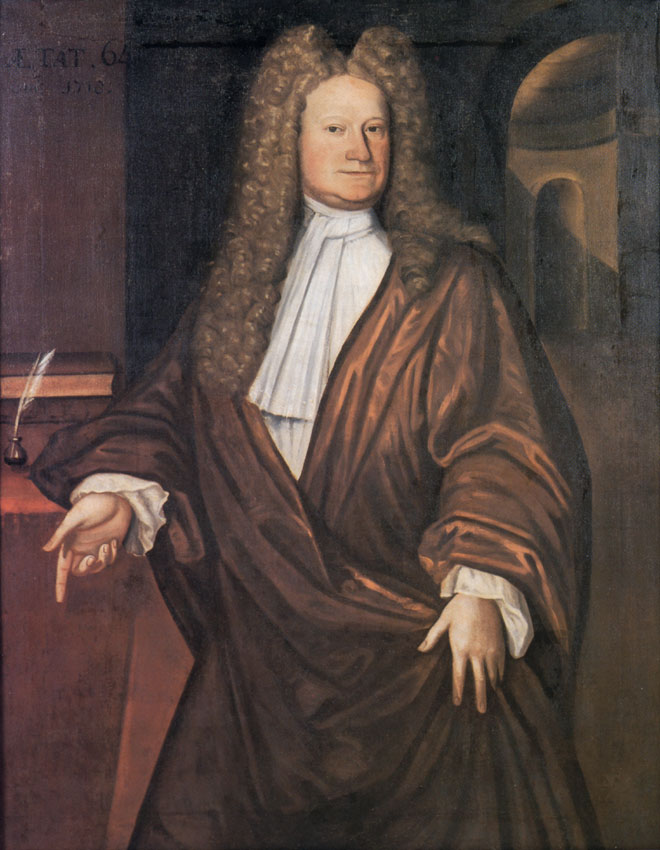

1st Lord of Livingston Manor
- In office 1715 – 1728
- Preceded by: Created
- Succeeded by: Philip Livingston

Personal details
- Born: 13 December 1654 Ancrum, County of Roxburgh, Scotland
- Died: 1 October 1728 (aged 73) New York, British America
- Spouse: Alida Schuyler (m. 1679; died 1727)
- Relations: See Livingston family
- Children: 9, including Philip, Robert, and Gilbert

Robert Livingston the Elder (13 December 1654 – 1728) was a Scottish-born merchant and government official in the Province of New York. He was granted a patent to 160,000 acres (650 km^{2}/ 250 sq mi) of land along the Hudson River, becoming the first lord of Livingston Manor.

== Early life ==
Coat of arms of the Livingston family

He was born in 1654 in the village of Ancrum, near Jedburgh, in the County of Roxburgh, Scotland. Robert was one of the seven children of Rev. John Livingston. He and his father were lineal descendants of William Livingston, 4th Lord Livingston, ancestor of the earls of Linlithgow and Callendar, via a grandson of William who was an early minister of the Church of Scotland.

In 1663, his father, John Livingston, was sent into exile due to his resistance to attempts to turn the Presbyterian national church into an Episcopalian institution. The exiled family settled in Rotterdam, in the Dutch Republic, where English merchants also worked. Robert became fluent in the Dutch language, which helped him greatly in his later career in New York and New Jersey, part of the former Dutch colony of New Netherland.

== Career ==
Following the death of his father in 1673, Robert Livingston returned to Scotland for a time. He sailed for Boston to find his fortune in North America. Livingston's father was well known in Puritan Boston, and a merchant advanced the young son enough stock and credit to undertake a trading venture to Albany, New York. Livingston arrived in Albany in late 1674. With his business and language skills, in August 1675 he became secretary to Nicholas Van Rensselaer, director of Rensselaerswyck, who died a few years later in 1678.

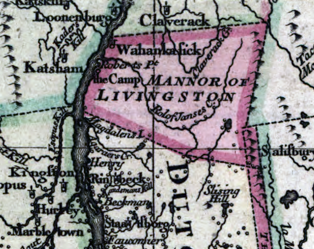
Map of Livingston Manor in 1777

In 1686, he and his brother-in-law, Pieter Schuyler, persuaded Governor Thomas Dongan to grant Albany a municipal charter like that awarded to New York City a few months earlier. Appointed as clerk of the city and county of Albany, Livingston collected a fee for each legal document registered. With Pieter Schuyler, he led the opposition in Albany to Leisler's Rebellion. In August 1695 his account of his private expenditures on behalf of the Crown was given to the authorities in the sum of £3,719. He served as Secretary for Indian Affairs from 1695 until his death. He was elected repeatedly to the New York provincial assembly, serving from 1709 to 1711, and 1716–1725; he was elected speaker in 1718.

According to Cynthia Kierner, "Robert Livingston valued public life primarily as a source of private profits. Livingston's generation looked upon politics as a business." In 1696, Livingston backed Captain William Kidd's privateer voyage on the Adventure Galley. Livingston was also involved in the lucrative institution of slavery. In addition to owning slaves in New York, he also became involved in the Atlantic slave trade, investing money into the slave ship Margriet in 1690.

=== Livingston Manor ===
Through the influence of Governor Thomas Dongan, and confirmed by royal charter of George I of Great Britain in 1715, Robert Livingston obtained a patent to 160,000 acres (650 km^{2}/ 250 sq mi) along the Hudson River south of Albany; this would become known as Livingston Manor in Columbia and Dutchess counties. He offered land on both sides of the Hudson River to Queen Anne's government of Great Britain to be used temporarily as work camps for German Palatine refugees, who were to harvest lumber and produce naval stores: timber for masts, turpentine, etc. for the British navy. Nearly 3,000 refugee Germans arrived in Manhattan in 1710, on ten ships from London. They worked for years in the camps to pay off their passage, before being granted land in the Mohawk and Schoharie valleys. Livingston made a substantial profit by selling supplies to the work camps and was paid by the British colonial government.

His will provided for the establishment of the Livingston Memorial Church and Burial Ground. The original church of 1721 was replaced by another built in the late 19th century. Burials at the cemetery ceased in 1890. The 19th-century church and ground was listed on the National Register of Historic Places in 1985.

Before entailing the bulk of the estate to his eldest son, Philip, Robert Livingston bequeathed about 13,000 acres to his third son and namesake, Robert. The younger man developed the property as an estate known as "Clermont". It is now recognized as a state historic site.

== Personal life ==
In 1679, Livingston married Alida Schuyler (1656–1727), the widow of Nicholas Van Rensselaer. She was the daughter of Philip Pieterse Schuyler, vice-director of Fort Orange, giving Livingston an important connection in the community. Robert Livingston amassed one of the largest fortunes in 17th-century New York. They had nine children together:

- Johannes Livingston (1680–1720), who married Mary Winthrop (1683–1713), daughter of Gov. Fitz-John Winthrop of the Winthrop family, in 1701. After her death, he married Elizabeth Knight (1689–1736), the daughter of Sarah Kemble Knight, in 1713.
- Margaret Livingston (1681–1758), who married Samuel Vetch (1668–1732), the Royal Governor of Nova Scotia.
- Joanna Philipina Livingston (1683–1689), who died young.
- Philip Livingston (1686–1749), the second Lord of the Manor who married Catherine Van Brugh (b. 1689), daughter of Pieter Van Brugh, the Mayor of Albany, New York.
- Robert Livingston (1688–1775), the owner of the Clermont Estate who married Margaret Howarden (1693–1758).
- Hubertus "Gilbert" Livingston (1690–1746), who married Cornelia Beekman, granddaughter of Wilhelmus Beekman, Mayor of New York, and niece of Gerardus Beekman.
- William Livingston (1692–1692), who died young.
- Joanna Livingston (1694–1734), who married Cornelius Gerrit Van Horne (1694–1752).
- Catherine Livingston (1698–1699), who died young.

=== Descendants ===
Livingston was the uncle of Robert Livingston the Younger, grandfather of Philip Livingston and William Livingston. Philip Livingston's granddaughter, Catherine Livingston married Abraham De Peyster. He was a loyalist Officer who served with the King's American Regiment and was at Battle of King's Mountain.

Through his son, Gilbert Livingston, he was the grandfather of Margaret Livingston (1738–1818), who married Peter Stuyvesant, a great-grandson of the Peter Stuyvesant who commanded the New Netherland colony on Manhattan island, and Joanna Livingston (1722–1808), who married Pierre Van Cortlandt (1721–1814), the first Lieutenant Governor of the New York.

Many Americans are descended from the Livingston family, including George W. Bush, the entire Fish and Kean families, First Lady Eleanor Roosevelt, First Lady of New York Anna Morton, actors Montgomery Clift and Michael Douglas, actress Jane Wyatt, poet Robert Lowell, cinematographer Floyd Crosby and his son David Crosby, author Wolcott Gibbs, and almost the entire Astor family.
