= Philip Pieterse Schuyler =

Dutch-American (1628–1683)

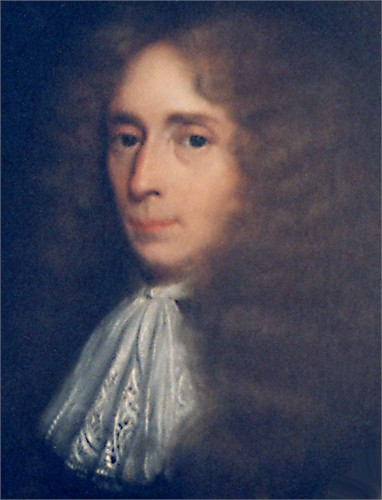
- Born: 1628; Amsterdam, Holland
- Died: 9 May 1683 (aged 54–55); Albany, Province of New York
- Resting place: Albany Rural Cemetery, Menands
- Spouse: Margaretta van Slichtenhorst
- Children: 10, including Alida, Pieter, Arent
- Parent(s): Pieter Tjercks van Schuylner; Geertruyt Philips van Schuyler
- Relatives: See Schuyler family

Colonel Philip Pieterse Schuyler or Philip Pieterse (1628 – 9 May 1683) was a Dutch-born landowner in New Netherlands and progenitor of the senior line of the American Schuyler family.

== Early life ==
Coat of Arms of Philip Schuyler

Philip Pieterse Schuyler was born in Amsterdam, Holland, in the Republic of the Seven United Provinces, in 1628 as the son of Pieter Tjercks (no family name) and Geertruyt Philips Van Schuylder. His father was a German-born Amsterdam baker. His brother, David Pieterse Schuyler, married Catharina Verplanck. They died in 1690 as a result of the Schenectady massacre of 1690. David was an ancestor of David Mathews, Loyalist Mayor of New York City during the American Revolution, as well as Theodore Roosevelt and Eleanor Roosevelt.

== Career ==
By 1650, he had emigrated to New Netherland, settling in Beverwyck. Although nominally a carpenter or gunstockmaker, he entered the fur trade, using the profits to buy land, beginning with the house he built in about 1659 on the corner of today's State and Pearl Streets in Albany. He also owned houses on Broadway and Beaver Street, where he resided at different times. In 1656, he was appointed by Governor Stuyvesant to the office of vice-director of Fort Orange until it was captured by the English in 1664. From 1664, onwards he lived under English rule in the Province of New York.

On 1 November 1667 Philip Pietrse was commissioned as a captain in the Albany militia. By 1672, he also had acquired land along the Hudson north of the Van Rensselaer manor house. That farm became a family summer home known as "the Flats". After he bought "the Flats", he built a new home on North Pearl Street, for winter use, in which he died. He also owned property in New Amsterdam, several hundred acres east of the Hudson below Rensselaerswyck, and lots in Wiltwyck and at Halfmoon as well. He took an active part in Indian affairs.

== Personal life ==
On 12 December 1650 he married Margaretta van Slichtenhorst, daughter of Brant Aertsz van Slichtenhorst, the director of Rensselaerwyck, appointed by Johan van Rensselaer. Together, they had ten children:

- Gysbert Schuyler (b. 2 July 1652 in Beverwyck), and died after 13 March 1664/65
- Gertruj Schuyler (b. 4 February 1654), who married Stephanus van Cortlandt (1643–1700), the patroon of Van Cortlandt Manor and a Mayor of New York City from 1677–1678 and again from 1686–1688.
- Alida Schuyler (b. 28 February 1656), who married Nicholas van Rensselaer. After his death in 1678, she married Robert Livingston the Elder
- Pieter Schuyler (b. 17 September 1657 – 19 February 1724), the first mayor of Albany
- Brant Schuyler (b. 18 December 1659)
- Arent Schuyler (b. 25 June 1662 – 26 November 1730)
- Sybilla Schuyler (b. 12 November 1664)
- Philip Schuyler (b. 8 February 1666)
- Johannes Schuyler (b. 5 April 1668), led an attack on La Prairie, Quebec in 1690
- Margritta Schuyler (b. 2 January 1672), married Jacobus Verplanck

Schuyler died in Albany, 9 May 1683.

=== Descendants ===
Schuyler was the progenitor of multiple generations of prominent New Yorkers as well as major players in American politics and business, including the Livingston family, the Bush family, and the Kean family.
