= Philip S. Van Rensselaer =

Mayor of Albany, New York

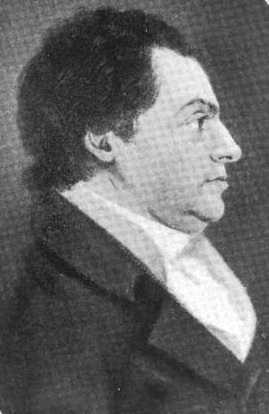

Mayor of Albany, New York
- In office 1819–1820
- Preceded by: Elisha Jenkins
- Succeeded by: Charles E. Dudley
- In office 1799–1816
- Preceded by: Abraham Ten Broeck
- Succeeded by: Elisha Jenkins

Personal details
- Born: Philip Schuyler Van Rensselaer; April 15, 1767 Albany, Province of New York
- Died: September 25, 1824 (aged 57) Albany, New York
- Spouse: Anne De Peyster Van Cortlandt (m. 1787)
- Parent(s): Stephen Van Rensselaer II; Catharine Livingston
- Relatives: See Van Rensselaer family

Philip Schuyler Van Rensselaer (April 15, 1767 – September 25, 1824) was the mayor of Albany, New York on two occasions. He has the third longest tenure of service by an Albany Mayor, after Erastus Corning 2nd and Gerald Jennings.

== Life and career ==
Philip S. Van Rensselaer was born in Albany on April 15, 1767. A son of Stephen Van Rensselaer II (1742–1769) and Catharina (or Catharine) Livingston (1745–1810), he was raised and educated at Van Rensselaer Manor. After his father's death his mother married Eilardus Westerlo (1738–1790), a member of another prominent Albany area family.

He was the brother of Stephen Van Rensselaer III (1764–1839) and the grandson of Philip Livingston (1716–1778). Abraham Ten Broeck (1734–1810) was his uncle. Rensselaer Westerlo (1776–1851) was his half-brother.

== Career ==
As an adult, Van Rensselaer lived in Albany and became a successful businessman and banker. Among his activities, he was the president of the Bank of Albany, a Trustee of Union College, and a founder of The Albany Academy. He owned several warehouses, extensive land along Albany's Hudson River waterfront, and flour and plaster mills on the Normans Kill at the Bethlehem town line. His mills were destroyed by fire in 1820.

In 1793 Van Rensselaer became an Alderman. He served as Mayor from 1799 to 1816, and was succeeded by Elisha Jenkins. Van Rensselaer returned to office from 1819 to 1820, and was succeeded by Charles E. Dudley.

During his time as Mayor, a permanent New York State Capitol building was constructed just in front of the current one, and Van Rensselaer laid the cornerstone. During his term, Robert Fulton's steamboat Clermont arrived in Albany at the end of its first voyage, and Schenectady County was created from a portion of Albany County.

Van Rensselaer was active as a Freemason, and served as New York's Grand Master from 1793 to 1795.

== Personal life ==
In 1787, he married Anne De Peyster Van Cortlandt (1766–1855), a distant cousin through the Schuyler family, daughter of Pierre Van Cortlandt, descendant of Mayor of New York City Stephanus Van Cortlandt, and sister of Philip Van Cortlandt and Pierre Van Cortlandt, Jr. They had no children.

He died in Albany on September 25, 1824. He was buried at Van Rensselaer Manor, and was later reinterred at Albany Rural Cemetery.
