= Pierre Van Cortlandt Jr. =

American politician

Pierre Van Cortlandt, Jr.
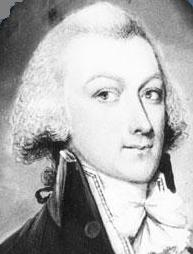

Member of the U.S. House of Representatives from New York's 3rd district
- In office March 4, 1811 – March 3, 1813
- Preceded by: Jonathan Fisk
- Succeeded by: Peter Denoyelles

Personal details
- Born: August 29, 1762 Croton-on-Hudson, Province of New York, British America
- Died: July 13, 1848 (aged 85) Peekskill, New York, U.S.
- Party: Democratic-Republican
- Spouses: Catherine Clinton (m. 1800; died 1811) Anne Stevenson (m. 1813; died 1821)
- Relations: Philip Van Cortlandt (brother)
- Children: Pierre Van Cortlandt III
- Parent(s): Pierre Van Cortlandt; Joanna Livingston
- Relatives: See Van Cortlandt family
- Education: Queen's College

Pierre Van Cortlandt Jr. (August 29, 1762 – July 13, 1848) was a United States representative from New York. A member of New York's Van Cortlandt family, he was the son of Pierre Van Cortlandt, an early New York political figure, and brother of Philip Van Cortlandt, who was also a U.S. Representative from New York.

== Early life ==
Pierre Van Cortlandt Jr. was born on August 29, 1762, at Van Cortlandt Manor in Croton-on-Hudson in the Province of New York. His parents were Pierre Van Cortlandt (1725–1819) and Joanna Livingston (1722–1808), daughter of Gilbert Livingston, a son of colonial official Robert Livingston the Elder. His great-grandfather was Stephanus Van Cortlandt, the first native-born Mayor of New York City, and his family were the patroons of Van Cortlandt Manor.

He pursued classical studies and was graduated from Queen's College (later Rutgers College) in 1783.

== Career ==
He studied law in the office of Alexander Hamilton and was admitted to the bar and commenced practice. He retired from his law practice and devoted his time to managing his estate in Westchester County. He owned slaves. He founded and was president of the Westchester County Bank at Peekskill from 1833 until his death there in 1848.

=== Fort Independence ===
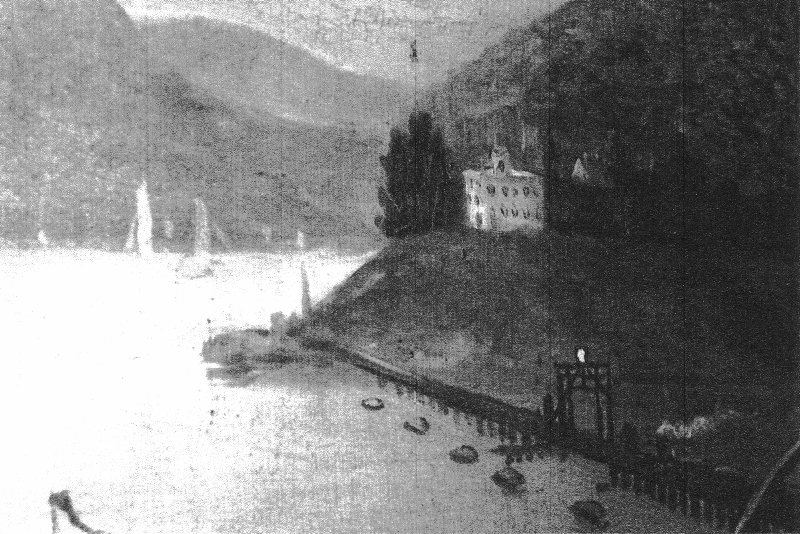
Fort Independence Hotel, right of center, in white. His father's "Oldstone" home is right of the hotel, c. 1860

In August 1776, at the foot of Anthony's Nose, Fort Independence was built on his father's land, on the north bank of the Annsville Creek as it empties into the Hudson River. It combined with Forts Montgomery and Clinton to defend the Hudson River Valley. Forts Montgomery and Clinton were started in June.

In the mid-19th century, he built Fort Independence Hotel below the site where Fort Independence once stood. Fort Independence had been built in August 1776, at the foot of Anthony's Nose, on the family's land on the north bank of the Annsville Creek as it empties into the Hudson River. It combined with Forts Montgomery and Clinton to defend the Hudson River Valley. Forts Montgomery and Clinton were started in June. Fort Hill Park, the site of Camp Peekskill, contained five barracks and two redoubts.

On the opposite side of Annsville Creek [north of Peekskill] at the point known as Roa or Roay and formerly Roya Hook, stood the old Revolutionary Fort Independence. In 1846 and for about three years subsequently some of the larger boats used to stop at this point. A large hotel had been built there about the same time by Pierre Van Cortlandt, known as the Fort Independence Hotel, and access to the village was furnished in 1845 by a wooden bridge across the mouth of the creek, fourteen hundred and ninety-six feet long. The bridge has long since rotted and been carried away.

=== Political office ===
In 1792, 1794, and 1795, Van Cortlandt was a member of the New York State Assembly and was elected as a Democratic-Republican to the Twelfth United States Congress, holding office from March 4, 1811, to March 3, 1813. He was a presidential elector on the Harrison ticket in 1840.

== Personal life ==
Coat of arms of Pierre Van Cortlandt Jr.

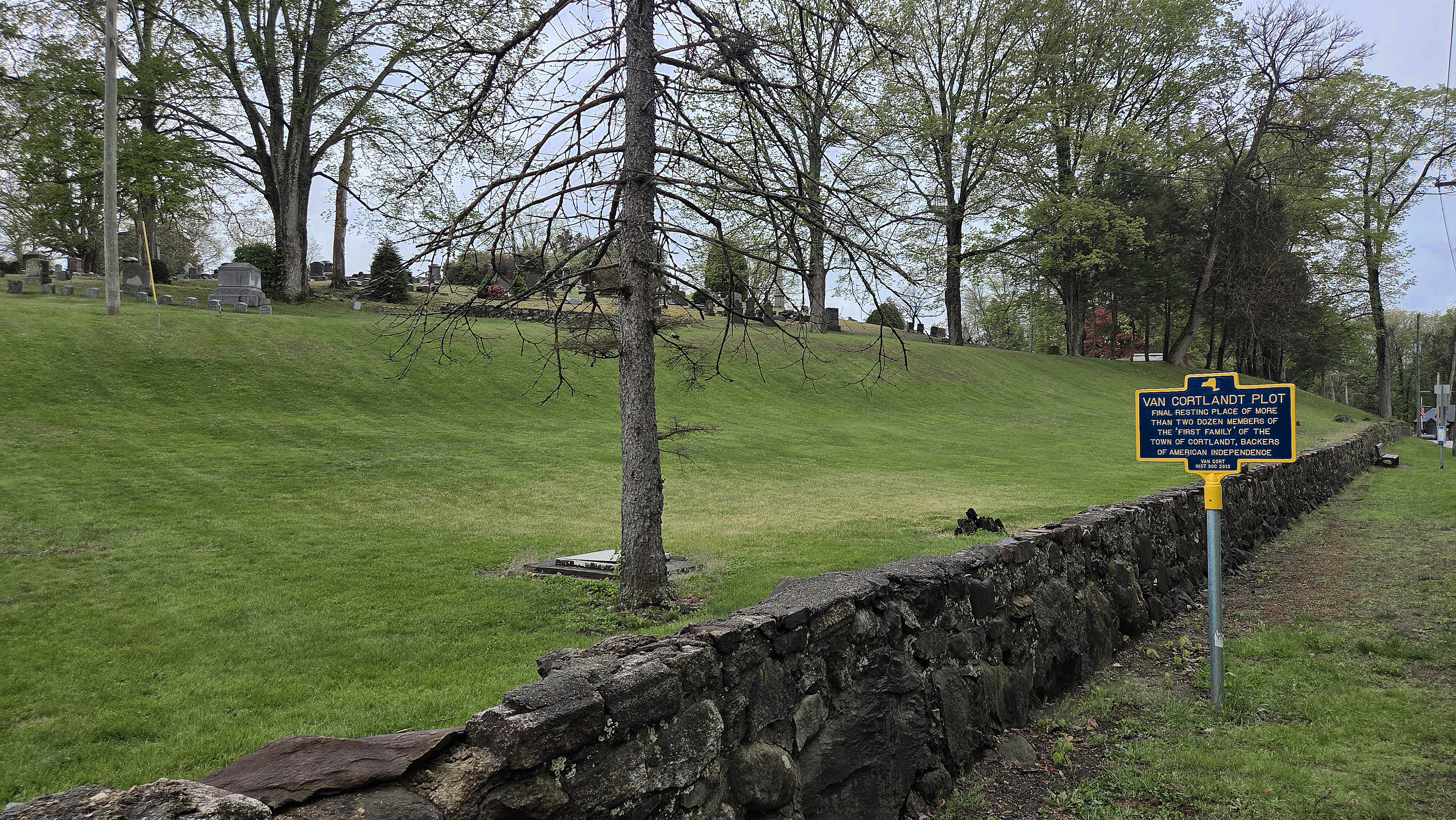
Historical marker for Van Cortlandt family plot at Hillside Cemetery

In 1800, Van Cortlandt married Catherine Clinton (1770–1811), daughter of George Clinton (1739–1812), and former wife of John Taylor (1765–1791).

After her death on January 10, 1811, he married Anne Stevenson (1774–1821), the daughter of John Stevenson (1734–1810) and Magdalena Douw (1750–1817), on May 10, 1813. Together, they had:

- Pierre Van Cortlandt III (1815–1884), who married Catharine Elizabeth Beck (1818–1895), daughter of Theodric Romeyn Beck and Harriet Caldwell

They resided at Van Cortlandt Upper Manor House and the family home known as Oldstone, 28 Bear Mountain Bridge Road, Cortlandt Manor, New York, from approximately 1783 until his death. He died in 1848 in Peekskill, New York. His grave is in the family plot at Hillside Cemetery, Cortlandt Manor.

=== Descendants ===
His grandchildren included Catherine Theresa Romeyn Van Cortlandt (1838–1921), Romeyn Beekman Van Cortlandt (1843–1843), James Stevenson Van Cortlandt (1844–1917), Theoderick Romeyn Van Cortlandt (1845–1880), and Philip Van Cortlandt (1857–1858).

U.S. House of Representatives
Preceded by Jonathan Fisk	Member of the U.S. House of Representatives from New York's 3rd congressional district 1811–1813	Succeeded by Peter Denoyelles
