= Senator Cortlandt =

Senator Cortlandt may refer to:

- Philip Van Cortlandt (1749–1831), New York State Senate
- Pierre Van Cortlandt (1721–1814), New York State Senate
