= Van Cortlandt Upper Manor House =

House in Cortlandt Manor, New York

- U.S. National Register of Historic Places
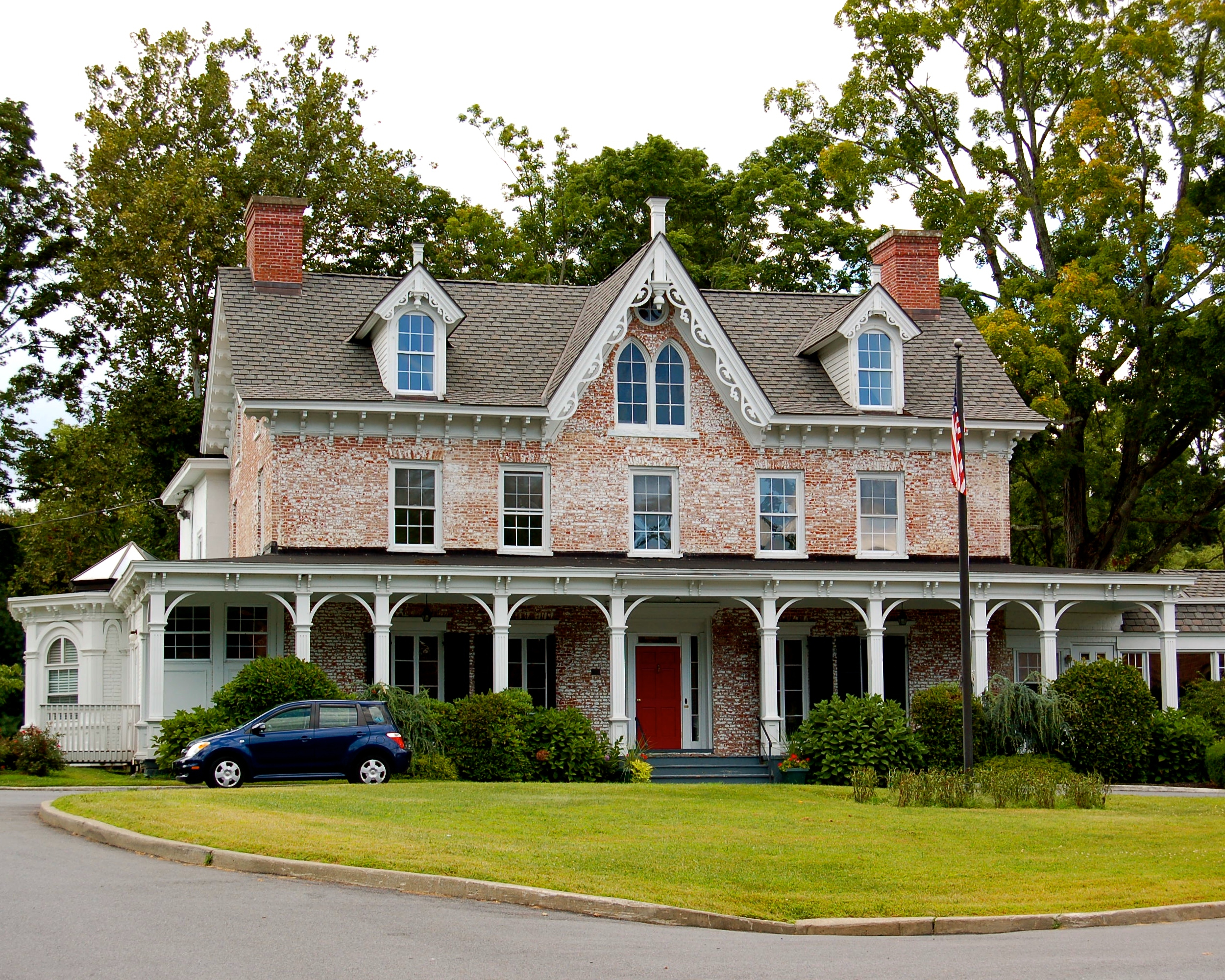

- Location within New York Location within the United States
- Location: Oregon Rd., Cortlandt Manor, New York
- Coordinates: 41.312705°N 73.905347°W
- Area: less than one acre
- Built: c. 1773
- NRHP reference No.: 81000417
- Added to NRHP: April 2, 1981

Van Cortlandt Upper Manor House is a historic home of the van Cortlandt family located in Cortlandt Manor, Westchester County, New York. The original house was built or significantly rebuilt about 1773 and subsequently enlarged and altered a number of times.

== History ==
The present-day structure is a 2 1/2-story, five-bay brick house, altered by the Van Cortlandt family in the 1830s. It has a gable roof covered in slate. A large 2 1/2-story frame wing covered in stucco was built in the 1920s.

It is highly likely that a smaller building stood on the site as early as 1756 under the ownership of Gertrude Van Cortlandt Beekman (1688-1777), who inherited the Peekskill portion of Van Cortlandt Manor when it was divided in the 1720s. After leasing the property from her, her nephew Pierre Van Cortlandt rebuilt or remodeled it in 1773. After 1783, the house was occupied by his son Pierre Van Cortlandt, Jr. (1762–1848) until his death. In 1889, the house was converted for use as a convalescent home and was later used as a nursing home.

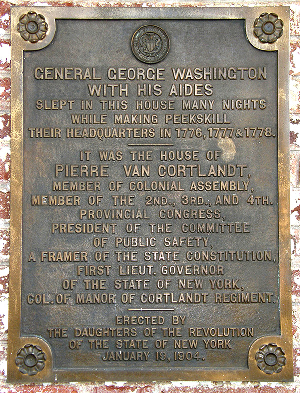
Upper Manor House Plaque

== Revolutionary War ==
During the American Revolutionary War, the house served as a refuge for the Van Cortlandt family, whose main Van Cortlandt Manor house was threatened, and later ransacked, by the British army. It also served as headquarters for General George Washington from November 10 to 12, 1776; November 28 to 30, 1779; and June 25 to July 2, 1781.

It was added to the National Register of Historic Places in 1981.

== See also ==
- List of Washington's Headquarters during the Revolutionary War
- National Register of Historic Places listings in Peekskill, New York
