= Peter Denoyelles =

American politician

Peter DeNoyelles

Member of the U.S. House of Representatives from New York's 3rd district
- In office March 4, 1813 – March 3, 1815
- Preceded by: Pierre Van Cortlandt Jr.
- Succeeded by: Jonathan Ward

New York State Assembly
- In office 1802–1803

Personal details
- Born: 1766 Haverstraw, Province of New York, British America
- Died: May 6, 1829 (aged 62–63) Haverstraw, New York, U.S.
- Resting place: Mount Repose Cemetery
- Party: Democratic-Republican

Peter DeNoyelles (1766 – May 6, 1829) was a Representative from New York, and member of the New York State Assembly.

== Career ==
Peter Denoyelles was born in Haverstraw, New York. He completed preparatory studies and engaged in the manufacture of bricks. Peter was member of the New York State Assembly between 1802 and 1803, and held several local offices. He was elected as a Democratic-Republican to the Thirteenth Congress for New York’s 3rd district on March 4, 1813. Peter left office on March 3,1815. He later resumed his former manufacturing pursuits.

From May 1813 to Mar 1815, Denoyelles missed 101 of 352 roll call votes, which is 28.7%. This is worse than the median of 18.4% among the lifetime records of representatives serving in Mar 1815.

== Death ==
He died in Haverstraw on May 6, 1829. Peter was buried in Mount Repose Cemetery.

== Sources ==
- United States Congress. "Peter Denoyelles (id: D000252)". Biographical Directory of the United States Congress.

== Notes ==
U.S. House of Representatives
Preceded by Pierre Van Cortlandt, Jr.	Member of the U.S. House of Representatives from New York's 3rd congressional district 1813–1815	Succeeded by Jonathan Ward
