= 1777 New York gubernatorial election =

- June 1-July 9, 1777
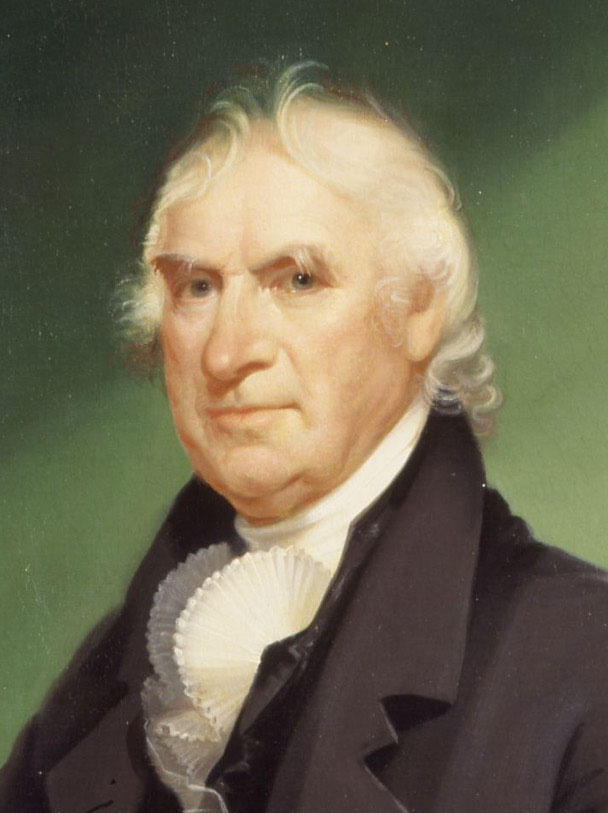

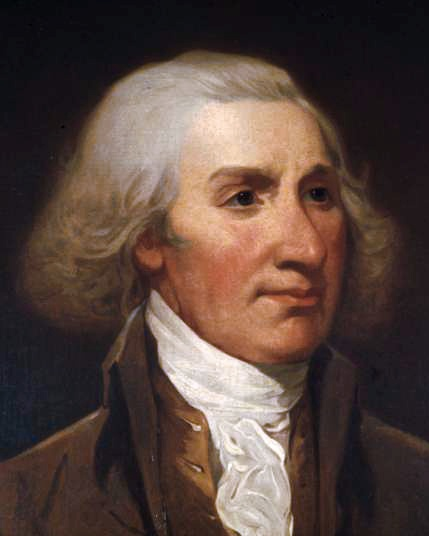

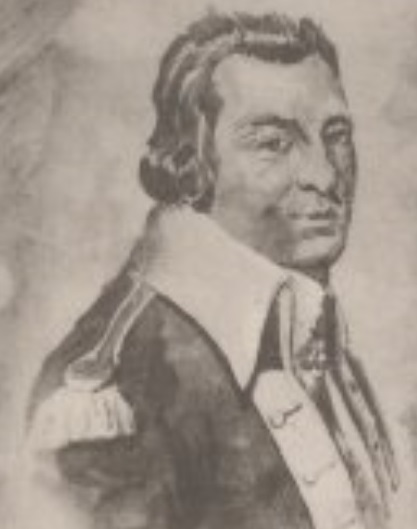

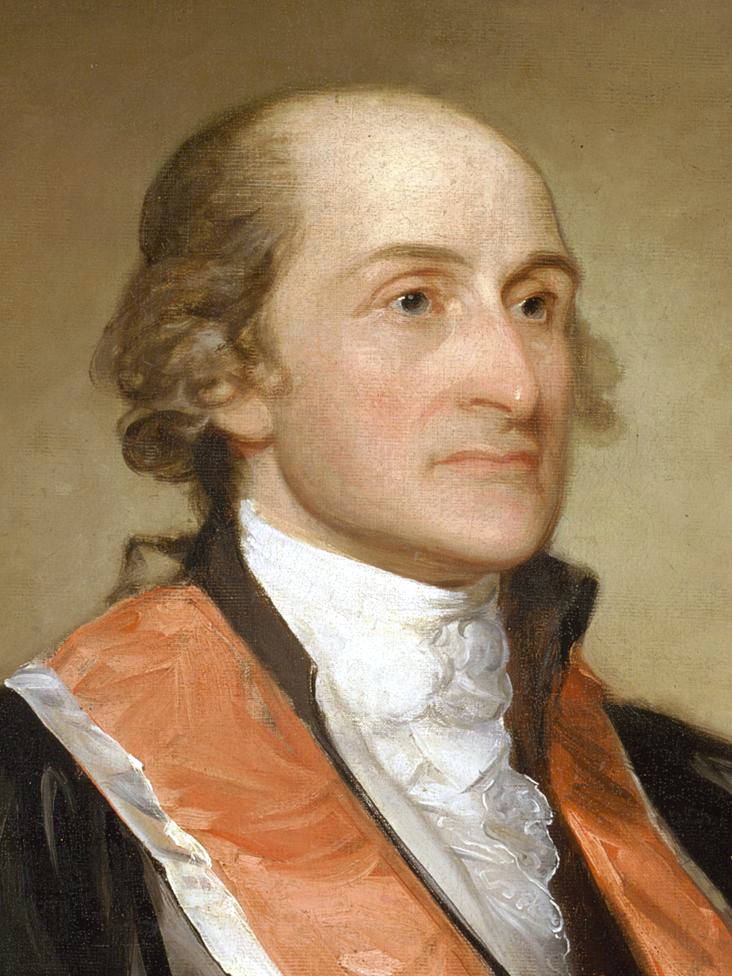
Nominee	George Clinton	Philip Schuyler
Party	Nonpartisan	Nonpartisan
Popular vote	1,828	1,199
Percentage	48.44%	31.77%
Nominee	John Morin Scott	John Jay
Party	Nonpartisan	Nonpartisan
Popular vote	368	367
Percentage	9.75%	9.72%
- County results Clinton: 40–50% 80–90% Schuyler: 40–50% 70–80% Scott: 70–80% Jay: 40–50% No Results
Governor before election
George Clinton
Nonpartisan
Elected Governor
George Clinton
Nonpartisan

The 1777 New York gubernatorial election was held in June 1777 to elect the governor and the lieutenant governor.

== History ==
The election began on June 1, but due to the American Revolution it took some time to collect and count the votes, and the official result was announced on July 9. George Clinton accepted the office of Governor on July 11 and assumed its duties immediately, pending to take the oath as soon as he could safely leave his military command. He took the oath of office on July 30.

There were no parties yet, as the Democratic-Republican and Federalist Parties appeared only in 1792. Until then the candidacies were based on personal recognition. The concepts of "running mates" also did not apply in this election, with candidates running separately for Governor and Lieutenant Governor. The New York Committee of Safety endorsed Philip Schuyler for Governor and George Clinton for Lieutenant Governor.

== Candidates ==
Candidates for Governor included:

- Brigadier General George Clinton
- Major General Philip Schuyler
- Brigadier General and member of the New York Provincial Congress John Morin Scott
- Member of the New York Provincial Congress John Jay

Candidates for Lieutenant Governor included:

- Brigadier General George Clinton
- Member of the New York Provincial Congress Pierre Van Cortlandt
- Colonel and member of the New York Provincial Congress Abraham Ten Broeck.

== Result ==
George Clinton was elected both Governor and Lieutenant Governor. Clinton formally resigned the lieutenant governorship, leaving a vacancy. State Senator Pierre Van Cortlandt was elected President pro tempore of the State Senate, and acted as Lieutenant Governor until the end of the legislative year. Van Cortlandt was then elected in a special election and took office as Lieutenant Governor on June 30, 1778.

1777 New York gubernatorial election
Party	Candidate	Votes	%
Nonpartisan	George Clinton	1,828	48.44%
Nonpartisan	Philip Schuyler	1,199	31.77%
Nonpartisan	John Morin Scott	368	9.75%
Nonpartisan	John Jay	367	9.72%
Nonpartisan	Robert R. Livingston	7	0.19%
Nonpartisan	Philip Livingston	5	0.13%
Total votes		3,774	100%

New York lieutenant gubernatorial election, 1777
Party	Candidate	Votes	%
Nonpartisan	George Clinton	1,647	47.15%
Nonpartisan	Pierre Van Cortlandt	1,098	31.43%
Nonpartisan	Abraham Ten Broeck	748	21.41%
Total votes		3,493	100%

== See also ==
- New York gubernatorial elections
