= Jonathan Ward (politician) =

American politician (1768–1842)

Member of the U.S. House of Representatives from New York's 3rd district
- In office March 4, 1815 – March 3, 1817
- Preceded by: Peter Denoyelles
- Succeeded by: Caleb Tompkins

Personal details
- Born: September 21, 1768 Haverstraw, Province of New York, British America
- Died: September 28, 1842 (aged 75–76) Haverstraw, New York, U.S.
- Party: Democratic-Republican

Jonathan Ward (September 21, 1768, Eastchester, Westchester County, New York – September 28, 1842, Eastchester, New York) was an American politician from New York.

== Life ==
He received limited schooling. Ward was Sheriff of Westchester County from 1802 to 1806, a member of the New York State Senate from 1807 to 1810, and a member of the Council of Appointment in 1809.

He was elected as a Democratic-Republican to the 14th United States Congress, holding office from March 4, 1815, to March 3, 1817. He was a delegate to the New York State Constitutional Convention of 1821, and was Surrogate of Westchester County from 1828 to 1840.

== Death ==
He died in Eastchester, New York, on September 28, 1842.

U.S. House of Representatives
Preceded by Peter Denoyelles	Member of the U.S. House of Representatives from New York's 3rd congressional district 1815–1817	Succeeded by Caleb Tompkins
