= Van Cortlandt Manor =

House in Croton-on-Hudson, New York

- Van Cortlandt Manor House
- U.S. National Register of Historic Places
- U.S. National Historic Landmark
- New York State Register of Historic Places
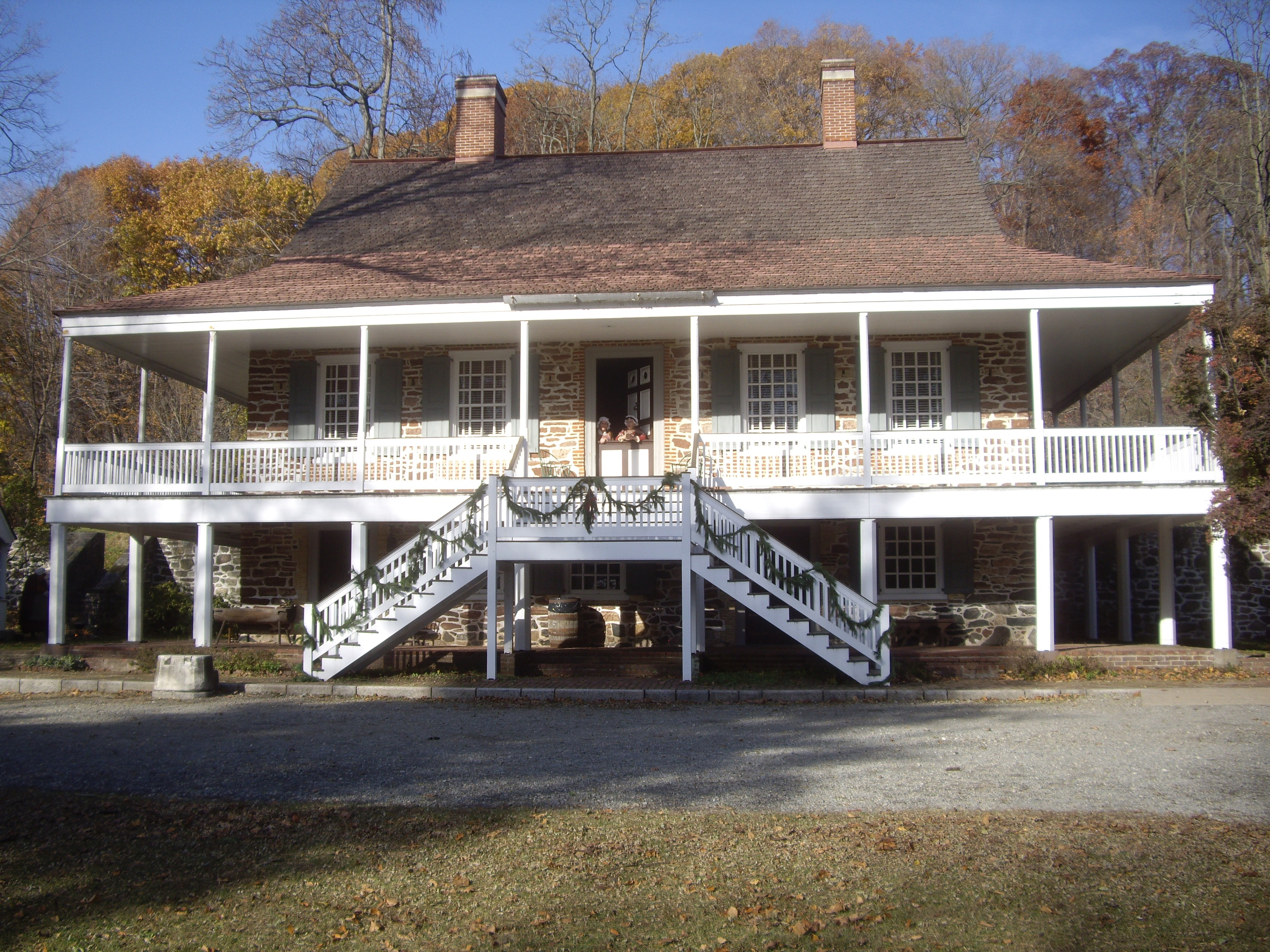

- Location within New York Location within the United States
- Location: South Riverside Avenue, Croton-on-Hudson, New York
- Coordinates: 41°11′30″N 73°52′35″W
- Built: 1665
- Architectural style: Dutch-English Colonial
- NRHP reference No.: 66000579
- NYSRHP No.: 11953.000005

Significant dates
- Added to NRHP: October 15, 1966
- Designated NHL: November 5, 1961
- Designated NYSRHP: June 23, 1980

Van Cortlandt Manor House is a 17th-century house and property built by the Van Cortlandt family located near the confluence of the Croton and Hudson Rivers in the village of Croton-on-Hudson in Westchester County, New York, United States. The colonial era stone and brick manor house is now a museum; it is a National Historic Landmark.

== History ==
Van Cortlandt Manor was originally an 86,000-acre (35,000 ha) tract granted by royal charter to Stephanus Van Cortlandt (son of Dutch immigrants who would become the first native-born mayor of New York City) in 1697 by King William III. As described in the charter, the tract stretched "from the Hudson River on the west to the first boundary line between the Province of New York and the Colony of Connecticut, on the east, twenty English miles in width by ten in height, in shape nearly a rectangular parallelogram, forming, The Manor of Cortlandt." The massive holding was acquired by direct purchase from the Kitchawank (also spelled Kitchtawanc or Kitchawonke) people, a Lenape tribe of the Wappinger confederacy. The purchase was made in part by Stephanus van Cortlandt, the first native-born mayor of New York City, and in part by others whose titles he subsequently bought. The Manor also included a small tract on the west side of the Hudson River opposite the promontory of Anthony's Nose, which van Cortlandt also purchased from the Lenape, this time, the Rumachenanck (Haverstraw) tribe.

Unlike other manors that followed primogeniture, Stephanus willed the estate not to the eldest son but to all his children equally, leading to the eventual breakup of the massive landholding. Following the death of Stephanus (1700) and his wife Geertruy (1723), the manor was divided among their 10 living heirs (plus a share for the heirs of an 11th child), some of whom sold off much of their land. The manor house, built sometime before 1732, and some 1,000 acres of surrounding lands were inherited by Philip Van Cortlandt (1683–1746). The house was not any owner's principal residence until Philip's son, Pierre Van Cortlandt, inherited it in his turn and moved there in 1749 with his family. He enlarged the property to a 4,000-acre (1,619 ha) estate and organized the lands into income-producing tenant farms.

Pierre made the manor into a self-sufficient community with a position of social and economic importance to the Hudson Valley. He established an apple orchard, dairy farm, carpenter and blacksmith shops, bee house, and kiln, as well as a tavern. A 1776 map shows a mill on a stream between Colabaugh Pond and the Croton River. Slaves were brought in to work in the main house. While the patriotic Van Cortlandts would champion the ideals of freedom and equality for the new nation during the American Revolution, their estate relied on the labor of enslaved Africans.

The manor house is essentially a Dutch colonial country house, and by no means a mansion comparable to the Philipse Manor Hall, the country seat of the Philipses, close relatives of the Van Cortlandts. Yet, it occupied an important place in the public life of the Province of New York because of its owner, Pierre Van Cortlandt, who was a prominent political figure and, during the American Revolutionary War, was one of the foremost supporters of the Colonial cause. Military leaders of the Revolution, including Washington, Rochambeau, Lafayette, von Steuben, and others, repeatedly visited it.

The manor was used to assist the Continental Army, providing food and supplies to Washington's troops. Pierre's son, Philip, served as a colonel in the Continental Army. Eventually, Pierre and his family had to vacate the manor in the thick of the war; it was ransacked by the British Army and left in poor standing. Philip, having become a brigadier general by the war's end, returned and, along with his sister, Catherine (who became well known for her resistance to the British occupiers), restored the manor to working order. The work of repairing and rebuilding the estate was done by slaves.

In the years that followed the war, Van Cortlandt Manor became a crucial stop on the route from New York to Albany. The Albany Post Road ran through the property, past the manor house. The mills were once again thriving and provided the community and travelers with food, supplies, and lodging. Pierre and his wife did not return until 1803, once the manor was in full working order again. The manor was passed down in the family until it was sold to a non-relative, Otis Taylor, in 1945. By this time, the property had lost luster and was not the flourishing estate it had once been. Some buildings and barn houses were taken down to accommodate more modern facilities, such as a drive-in movie theater.

In 1953, John D. Rockefeller Jr. purchased the property and began restoring the manor to its previous prominence. It officially opened to the public as a museum in 1959. The museum holds many original furnishings, which the Van Cortlandt family members preserved through generations. In 1961, Van Cortlandt Manor was registered as a National Historic Landmark.

It is one of the historic sites owned and operated by Historic Hudson Valley. The house is not included in the area of the hamlet of Cortlandt Manor, New York.

== Current uses ==
Beginning in 2005, Van Cortlandt Manor has been used every fall for The Great Jack O'Lantern Blaze. The Great Jack O'Lantern Blaze, also called Blaze, is an immersive display of hand-carved and illuminated jack-o-lanterns. Its first year at Van Cortlandt Manor featured 2,500 pumpkins over eight nights, and it has since grown to more than 7,000 pumpkins over 52 nights. Prior to moving to the Hudson Valley, Blaze operated out of Old Bethpage Village Restoration on Long Island for four years, from 2000 to 2004.

== See also ==
- Van Cortlandt family
- List of National Historic Landmarks in New York
- National Register of Historic Places listings in northern Westchester County, New York
