= Philip Van Cortlandt =

American politician 1749–1831

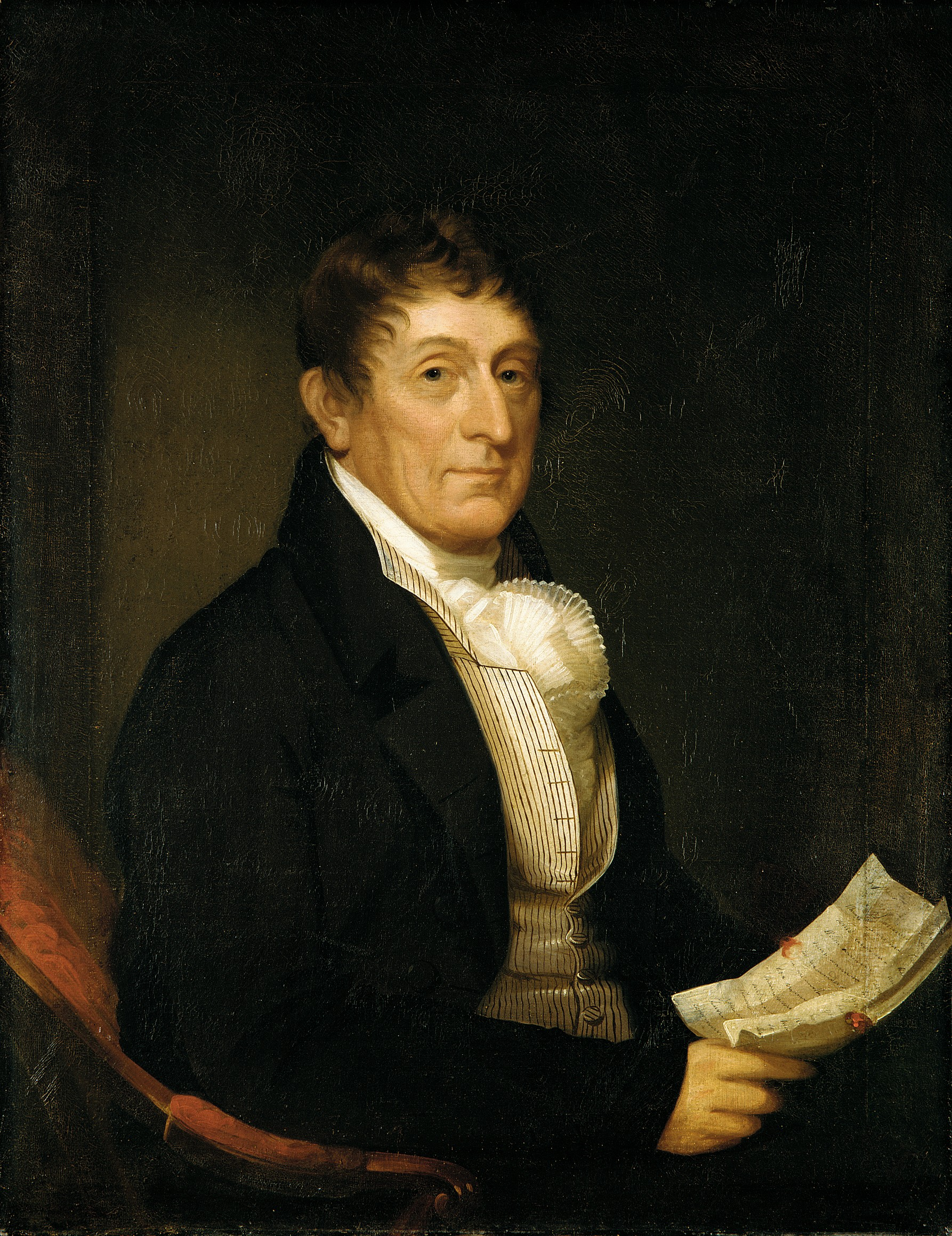
- Portrait of Van Cortlandt by Ezra Ames, ca. 1810

Member of the U.S. House of Representatives from New York
- In office March 4, 1793 – March 3, 1809
- Preceded by: Egbert Benson
- Succeeded by: James Emott
- Constituency: 3rd district (1793–1803); 4th district (1803–1809)

Member of the New York State Senate for the Southern District
- In office July 1, 1790 – January 1793
- Succeeded by: Matthew Clarkson

Member of the New York State Assembly for Westchester County
- In office July 1, 1788 – June 30, 1790

Personal details
- Born: September 1, 1749 New York City, Province of New York, British America
- Died: November 5, 1831 (aged 82) Croton-on-Hudson, New York, U.S.
- Party: Federalist; Democratic-Republican
- Relations: Pierre Van Cortlandt, Jr. (brother)
- Parent(s): Pierre Van Cortlandt; Joanna Livingston
- Relatives: See Van Cortlandt family
- Education: Coldenham Academy

Military service
- Allegiance: United States
- Branch/service: Continental Army
- Rank: Brigadier General
- Commands: 2nd New York Regiment
- Battles/wars: American Revolutionary War: • Battle of Saratoga • Battle of Bemis Heights • Valley Forge • Sullivan Expedition

Philip Van Cortlandt (September 1, 1749 – November 5, 1831) was an American surveyor, landowner, and politician from Westchester County, New York. Van Cortlandt was the son of Pierre Van Cortlandt and brother of Pierre Van Cortlandt, Jr. He was a Continental Army officer during the American Revolution, and later served several terms in the United States House of Representatives.

== Early life ==
Philip Van Cortlandt was born in New York City in the Province of New York on September 1, 1749, in the Van Cortlandt ancestral home located on Stone Street, near the Battery. He died unmarried, on November 5, 1831, at Van Cortlandt Manor, and was a member of one of New York's most prominent families. He was the eldest son of Pierre Van Cortlandt and Joanna Livingston, daughter of Gilbert Livingston, a son of Robert Livingston. His great-grandfather was Stephanus Van Cortlandt, the first native-born Mayor of New York City, and his family were the patroons (and later lords) of Van Cortlandt Manor.

Philip Van Cortlandt attended Coldenham Academy. In addition to exercising manorial rights while assisting in the management of the estate's farming and manufacturing activities, Philip Van Cortlandt was a civil engineer, and was active in New York's pre-Revolutionary War loyalist militia as a major. At the start of the Revolution, he resigned from the militia, and became active in politics as a founding member of the New York Provincial Congress in 1775. He owned slaves.

== American Revolution ==
During the Revolutionary War, Van Cortlandt commanded 4th Battalion of the New York Continental Infantry, served on George Washington's staff, and commanded the Continental Army's 2nd New York Regiment. He fought at the Battle of Saratoga, was with the Army at Valley Forge, and took part in the Sullivan Expedition.

In his memoir, Van Cortlandt recalled his activities during the 1777 Saratoga campaign. In the course of attempting to capture a British gunboat on the Hudson River on the night of the September 17, he and his men stumbled upon an advance guard of Burgoyne's British forces at a place he designated as "Blind Mores". Upon realizing that a main enemy encampment was nearby, Van Cortlandt dispatched messengers to Continental Army commanders in the area, including Benedict Arnold and Enoch Poor, and Daniel Morgan, informing them that "the Enemy was advancing so that they (the Continental Army) might make arrangements Immediately to check their (Burgoyne's troops) advance."

Van Cortlandt's regiment occupied a position on the left flank, and played a significant role in the fighting on September 19 and in the subsequent Battle of Bemis Heights on October 7, which led to Burgoyne's surrender on October 17.

After Burgoyne's surrender, Van Cortlandt moved his regiment moved to Kingston, which Sir Henry Clinton had burned before his hasty retreat to New York; Van Cortlandt subsequently joined Washington at White Marsh, and then went into winter quarters at Valley Forge.

Van Cortlandt subsequently commanded the post at Radnor Friends Meetinghouse; his regiment pursued the British during their retreat from Philadelphia, and took part in the June 1778 Battle of Monmouth. He rejoined the regiment in Poughkeepsie, and resumed the command during the winter of 1778 in the cantonments at New Windsor.

=== Sullivan Expedition ===
In the summer of 1779, Van Cortlandt's regiment took part in the Sullivan Expedition. Sullivan's adversary was the Mohawk war chief Joseph Brant, who combined his forces with those of Loyalist John Butler to attack the frontier settlements of New York and Pennsylvania. Van Cortlandt came to respect Brant's abilities, and hung his portrait at Van Cortlandt Manor after the war.

The immediate task confronting Van Cortlandt was to clear a road from Easton through the Wyoming Territory, a distance of some sixty-five miles. He completed his portion of the road in thirty days. The difficulty of this project was recognized by Sullivan when he thanked Van Cortlandt and Colonel Oliver Spencer of the Fifth New Jersey Regiment for their "unparalleled exertions in clearing and repairing the road to Wyoming."

In 1779 and 1780, Van Cortlandt was a member of the Court Martial that charged Benedict Arnold with improper conduct while in command of Philadelphia. This was the third time that Van Cortlandt became directly embroiled with Benedict Arnold. This time, the Pennsylvania Provincial Council had accused Arnold of committing eight violations while supervising the city. A Congressional committee determined that some of the charges should be dismissed, others could only be tried in a civil court, and the remainder were subject to review by a court martial. According to Van Cortlandt's memoir, a minority sought to have Arnold cashiered out of the army; instead, he was merely reprimanded by George Washington. It is now known that Arnold was guilty of some of the charges relating to war profiteering, but that a poor case was made against him by the Pennsylvania authorities.

Van Cortlandt's correspondence regarding Arnold includes these two passages:

I remained time sufficient to discover the Vile conduct of Arnold in procuring a Vast Quantity of goods from the Merchants of Montrial which he intended and which I believe was appropriated to his benefit and also for improper conduct before the Court he would have been arrested himself, but escaped by procuring an order from Genl. Gates to send me the morning after the Court has adjourned, to Schenesborough (Whitehall) by which means the Court was dissolved, Hazen released from arrest, & Arnold escaped Sensure which he ought to have had.

Genl Arnold being under arrest for improper conduct in Philadelphia while he commanded there I was one of the court martial. M. G. Howe President and there were also on that court four officers who had been at Ticonderoga when Colo. Hazen was called on for trial as before related and we were for Cashiering Arnold but were overruled and he was sentenced to be reprimanded by the Commander-in-Chief. If all the court had known Arnold's former Conduct as well as myself how he and his Brigade Major had Robbed Merchants in Montreal he would have been Dismissed from serving any longer in our Army for he would have been cashiered if so he would never have had the Command at West Point and Major Andrew might have lived until this day."

In the fall of 1780, Van Cortlandt's regiment served as the Army's rear guard as it marched to Yorktown. There he commanded the New York Brigade in the trenches until Cornwallis surrendered. He then took charge of the British prisoners on their march to Fredericksburg, and finally went into Winter quarters at Pompton, New Jersey.

Van Cortlandt was commended for gallantry at Yorktown, and mustered out of the service at the end of the war with the rank of Brigadier General.

== Later career ==
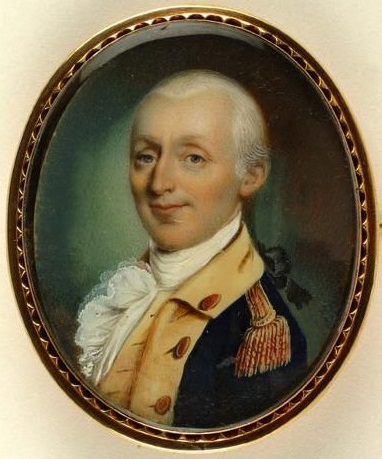
Philip Van Cortlandt

Van Cortlandt served in local office, including town supervisor of Cortlandt, member of the town school board, and town road commissioner.

In 1788, Van Cortlandt was a member of the state convention which ratified the United States Constitution, and worked for its approval. He served in the New York State Assembly from 1788 to 1790, representing Westchester County, and the New York State Senate from 1791 to 1793, representing the Southern District, which consisted of Kings, New York, Queens, Richmond, Suffolk and Westchester counties.

In January 1793, Van Cortlandt was elected to the United States House of Representatives as a Democratic-Republican, and he served eight terms, 1793 to 1809.

Van Cortlandt's wartime portrait, copied from a miniature painted about the close of the Revolution, reveals his likeness to Lafayette. Van Cortlandt accompanied Lafayette on Lafayette's 1824 Tour of the United States. His resemblance to Lafayette was used to advantage at least once. At a large reception Lafayette, wearied with handshaking, suddenly disappeared and left Van Cortlandt as a substitute. The guests, unaware of the change, departed satisfied that they had shaken hands with Lafayette.

=== Society of the Cincinnati ===
In 1783 Van Cortlandt was one of 35 officers who created the Society of the Cincinnati. He was an organizer of the New York Society of the Cincinnati, served on the committee creating its bylaws, and served as Treasurer from 1783 to 1788.

Van Cortlandt was one of the Masters of Ceremony for the presentation of the gold eagle insignia and diploma to new members at the New York Society's first meeting, held July 4, 1786, at the City Tavern Club, formerly the home of Van Cortlandt's brother in law Stephen Delancey.

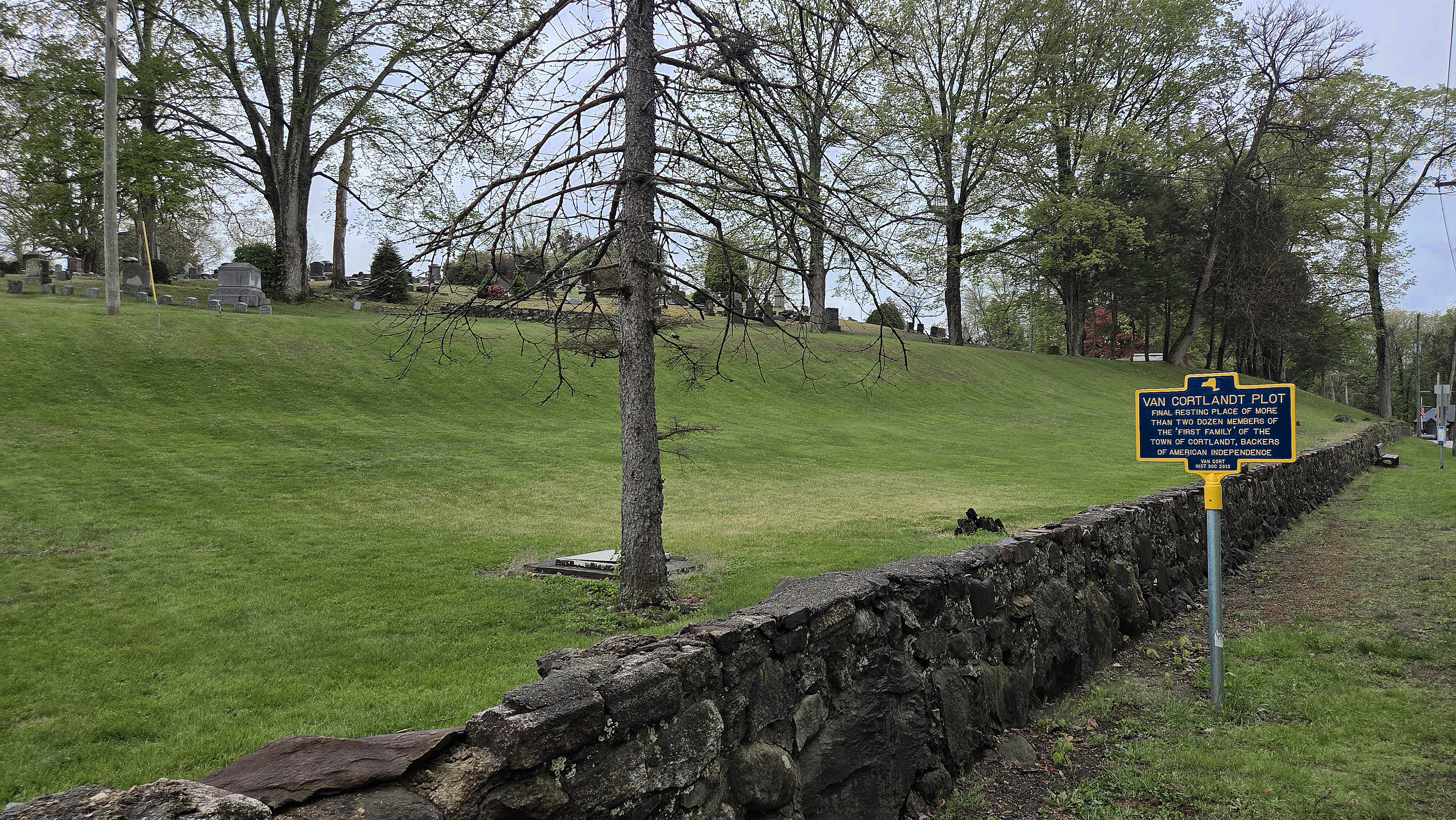
Historical marker for Van Cortlandt family plot at Hillside Cemetery

== Death and burial ==
Coat of arms of Philip Van Cortlandt

He died at Van Cortlandt Manor in Croton-on-Hudson on November 5, 1831. His grave is in the family plot at Hillside Cemetery, Cortlandt Manor.

Van Cortlandt never married, and had no children; his sister Catharine Van Wyck resided with him after the death of her husband.

U.S. House of Representatives
| Preceded by Egbert Benson | Member of the U.S. House of Representatives from New York's 3rd congressional district 1793–1803 | Succeeded by Samuel Latham Mitchill |
| Preceded by Lucas Elmendorf | Member of the U.S. House of Representatives from New York's 4th congressional district 1803–1809 | Succeeded by James Emott |
