= Anthony's Nose (Westchester County, New York) =

Peak in Westchester County, New York, United States

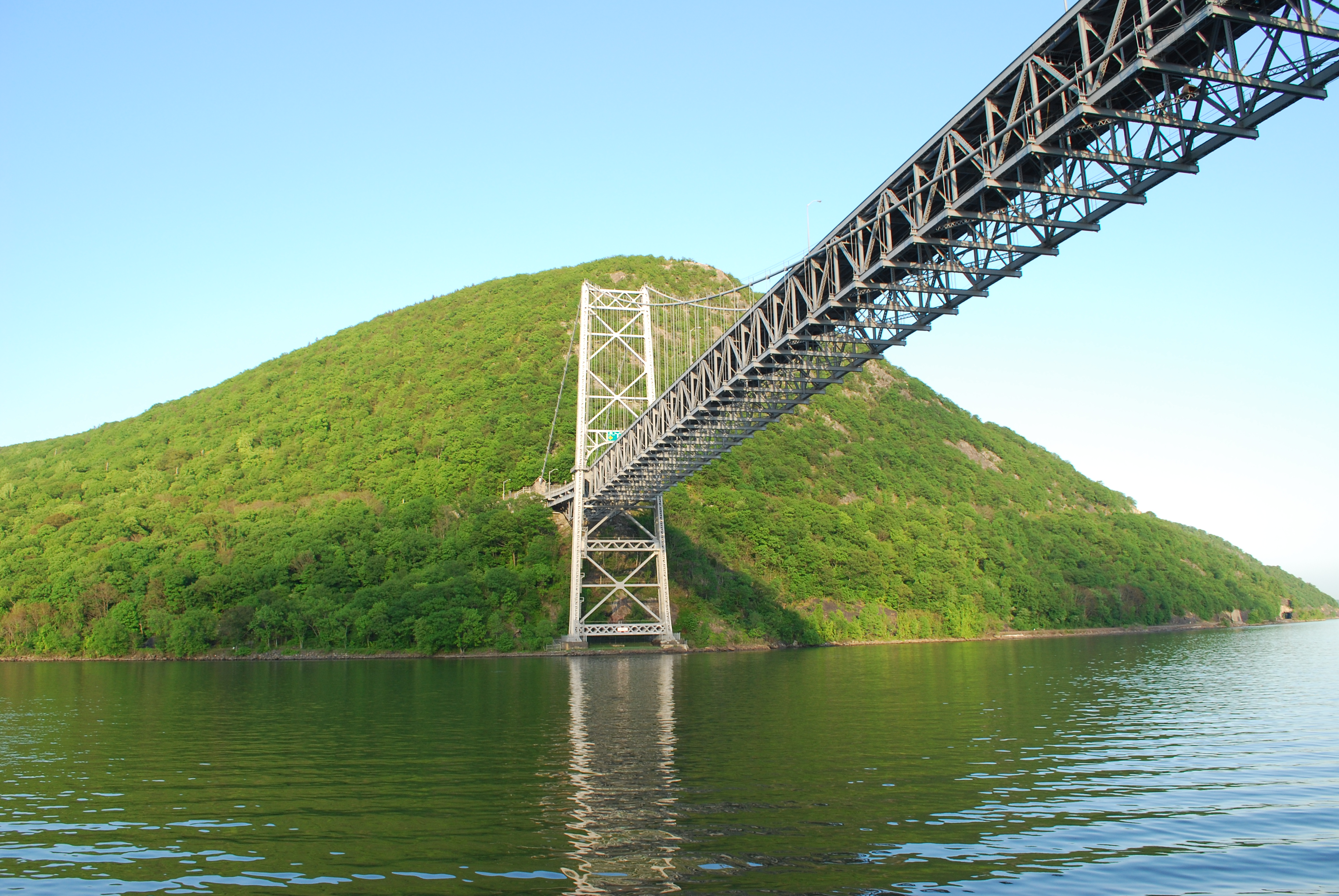
- The Hudson River, Bear Mountain Bridge, and Anthony's Nose

Highest point
- Elevation: 900+ ft (270 m)
- Prominence: 360 ft (110 m)
- Coordinates: 41°19′06″N 73°58′29″W

Geography
- Location within New York Location within the United States
- Location: Cortlandt Manor, Westchester County, New York
- Parent range: Hudson Highlands
- Topo map: USGS Peekskill

Climbing
- Easiest route: Trail Hike

Anthony's Nose is a 900+ ft (270 m) peak in the Hudson Highlands along the east bank of the Hudson River in the hamlet of Cortlandt Manor, New York. It lies at the extreme northwest end of Westchester County, and serves as the east anchor of the Bear Mountain Bridge.

== Topography ==
Anthony's Nose, together with Dunderberg Mountain, comprises the South Gate of the Hudson Highlands. It forms a ridge running northeast and southwest, being separated from Canada Hill to the northeast by Copper Mine Brook and the "South Mountain Pass", and being bordered on the southwest by the Hudson. The Hudson makes a turn around the southwestern tip, so that the northwestern side also slopes down to salt marshes along the river. On the southeastern side are Mine Mountain and, across Broccy Creek, Manitou Mountain. Most of this land is part of Camp Smith, a New York National Guard reservation.

US 6/202 crosses the Hudson on the Bear Mountain Bridge to the western tip of the mountain, where it meets NY 9D. 9D runs northeast along the northwestern flank of the mountain to Garrison, New York, while 202/6 runs southeast, hugging the cliffs, towards Peekskill. The main line of the New York Central Railroad, now Metro-North's Hudson Line, runs along the mountain and passes under the western tip and the Bear Mountain Bridge through a tunnel bearing the peak's name.

== History ==
The peak has been known as Anthony's Nose since at least 1697, when the name appears on a grant patent for the Highland Patent, also known as the Philipse Patent for its original owner, Frederick Philipse, the first Lord of Philipse Manor.

Washington Irving's Knickerbocker's History of New York, a parody, attributes the name to one Anthony Van Corlaer, a trumpeter of New Amsterdam, modeled at least in part on the real Dutch colonial Arent van Corlaer (1619–1667).

Another traditions names Anthony de Hooges (1620–1655), a deacon of the Dutch Reformed Church and early settler of Rensselaerswyck, for his prominent nose.

One of the Hudson River Chains was stretched from Fort Montgomery above West Point to the foot of the mountain. The Bear Mountain Bridge was later constructed along approximately that alignment. An airway beacon was once located on the summit.

== Geology ==
The mountain is composed of Canada Hill granite. Large calcite crystals have been collected from the railroad cut along the base.

== Trails ==
The Appalachian Trail crosses the Bear Mountain Bridge and follows NY Rt. 9D for a short distance before turning east and climbing the side of the mountain. It skirts the summit ridge, descends into the clove between Anthony's Nose and Mine Mountain, and from there into South Mountain Pass. The blue-blazed Camp Smith Trail leaves the AT southwestward just above the descent to 9D, and runs along the ridge to reach the summit. From there, it runs along the border of Camp Smith to reach parking along U.S. Rt. 202/U.S. Rt. 6 on the south side of Manitou Mountain.

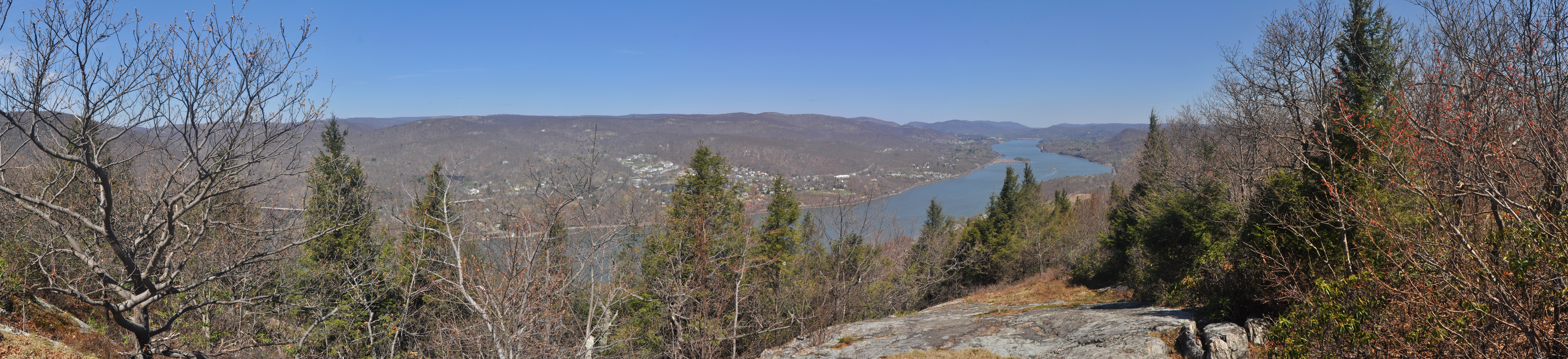
Panoramic view looking northwest from just north of the summit of Anthony's Nose, reached by taking at least one unmarked trail to the right off the Camp Smith Trail
