= Cortlandt Manor, New York =

Cortlandt Manor
- Unincorporated area
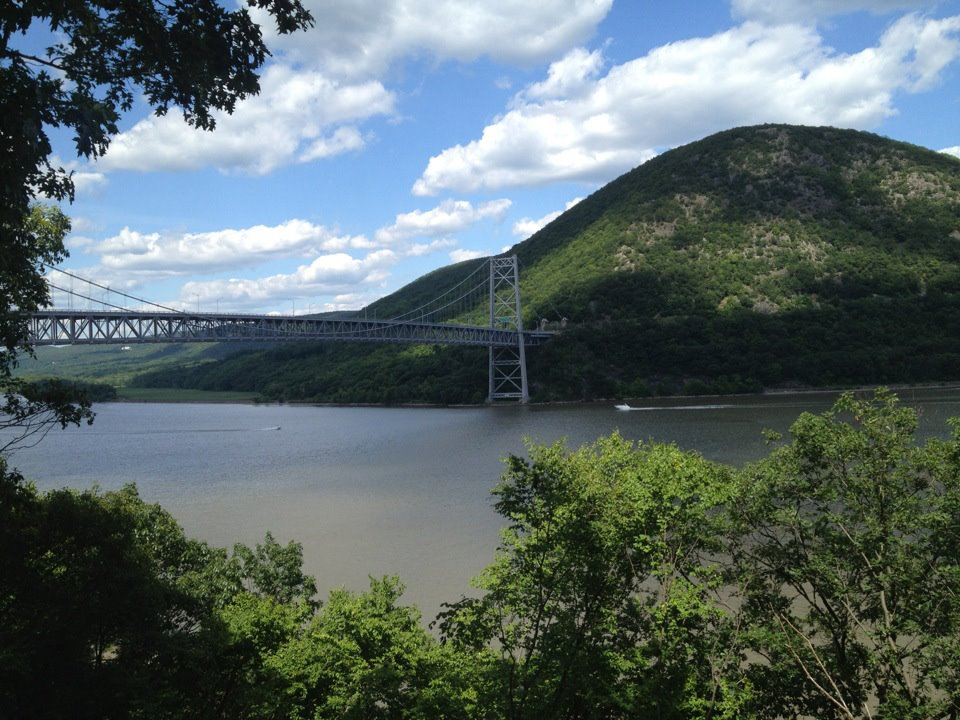
- Anthony's Nose and the Bear Mountain Bridge in Cortlandt Manor

- Location within the state of New York
- Coordinates: 41°16′48″N 73°52′12″W
- Country: United States
- State: New York
- County: Westchester
- Town: Cortlandt
- Time zone: UTC-5 (Eastern (EST))
  - Summer (DST): UTC-4 (EDT)
- ZIP codes: 10567

Cortlandt Manor is a hamlet—an unincorporated section—of the town of Cortlandt in northern Westchester County, New York, roughly surrounding Peekskill, lying east of Crugers and Montrose, and north of Croton-on-Hudson. It is a mostly residential area.

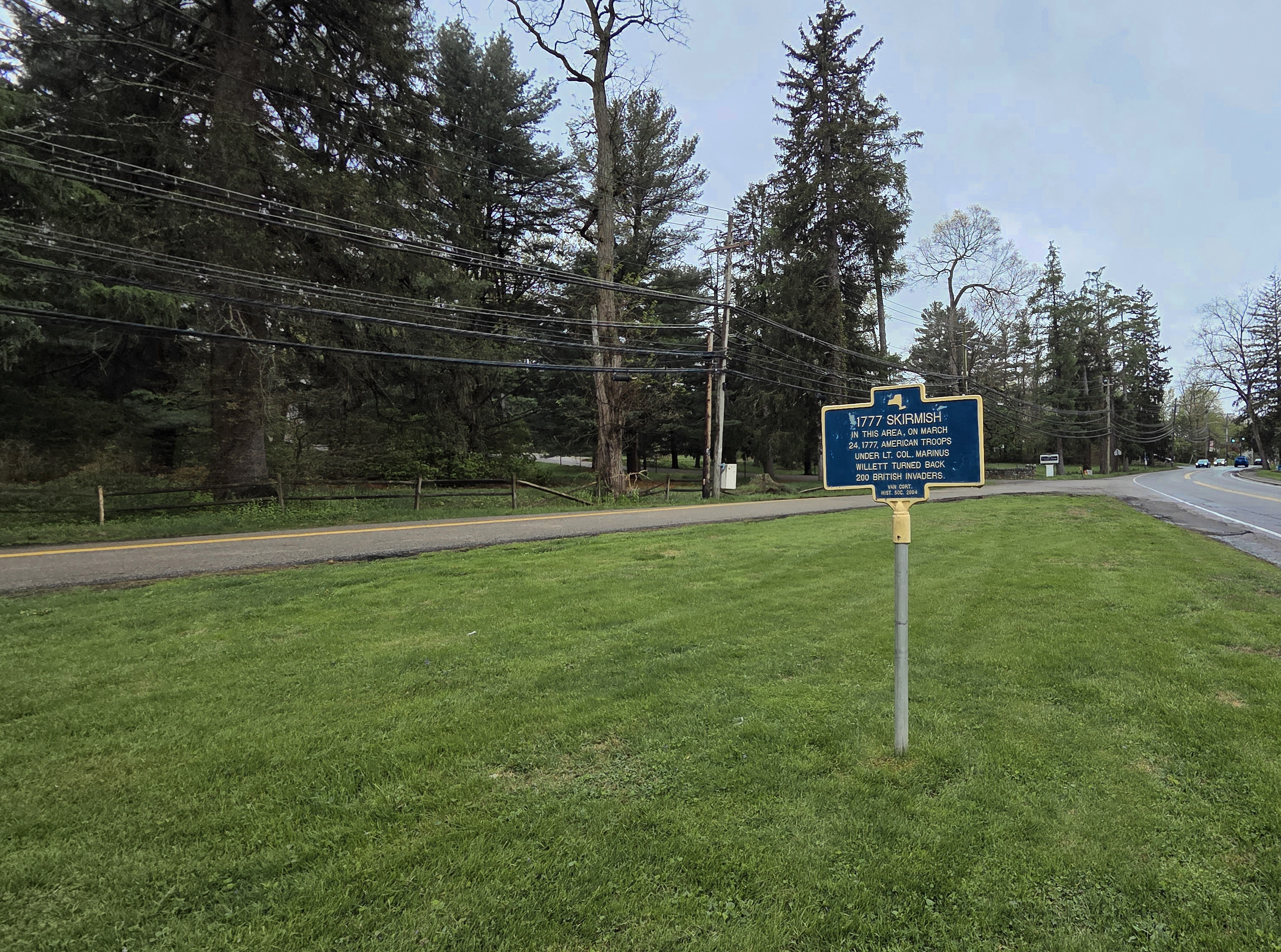
Revolutionary War skirmish marker at Donnelly Place & Oregon Rd.

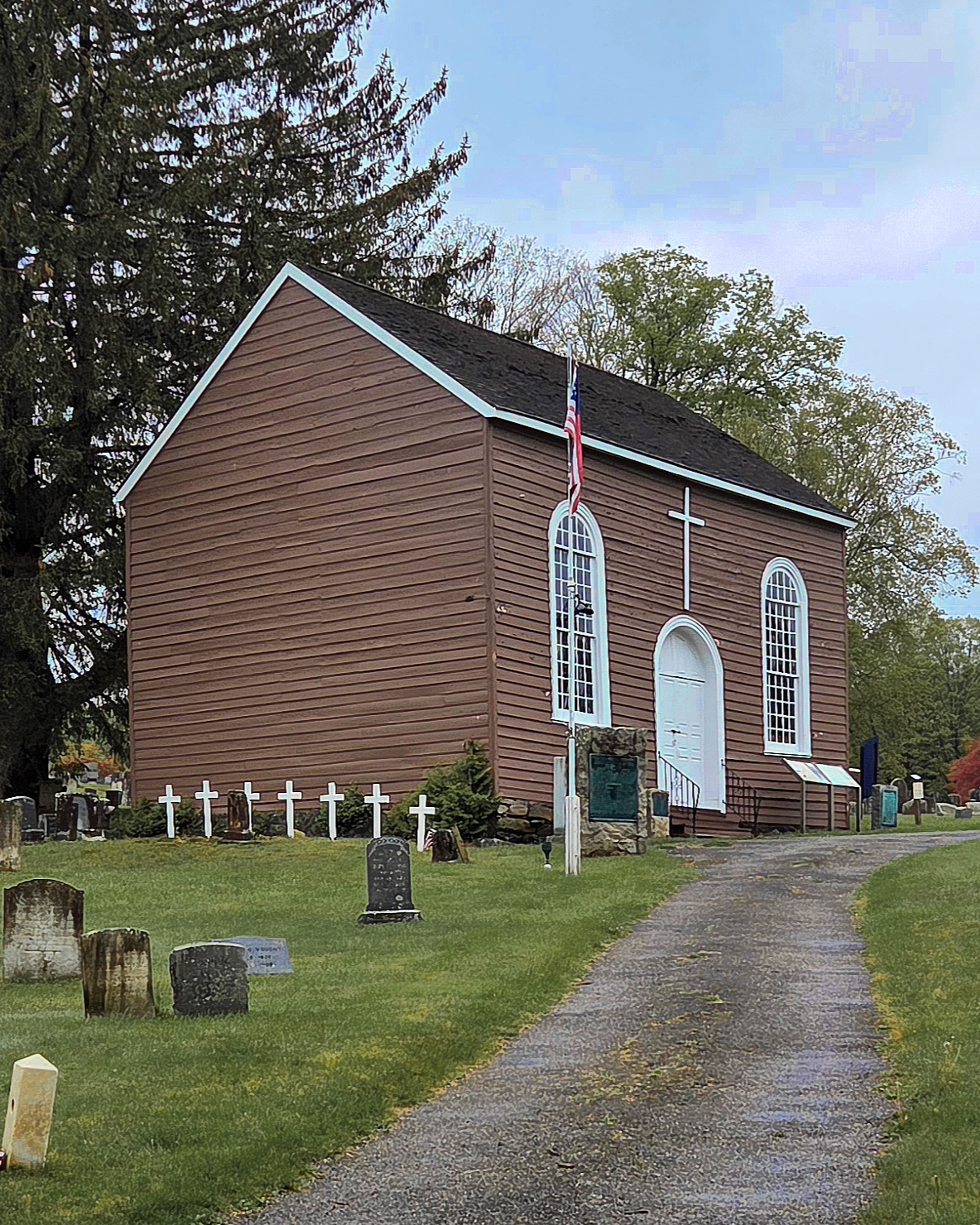
Old St. Peter's Church

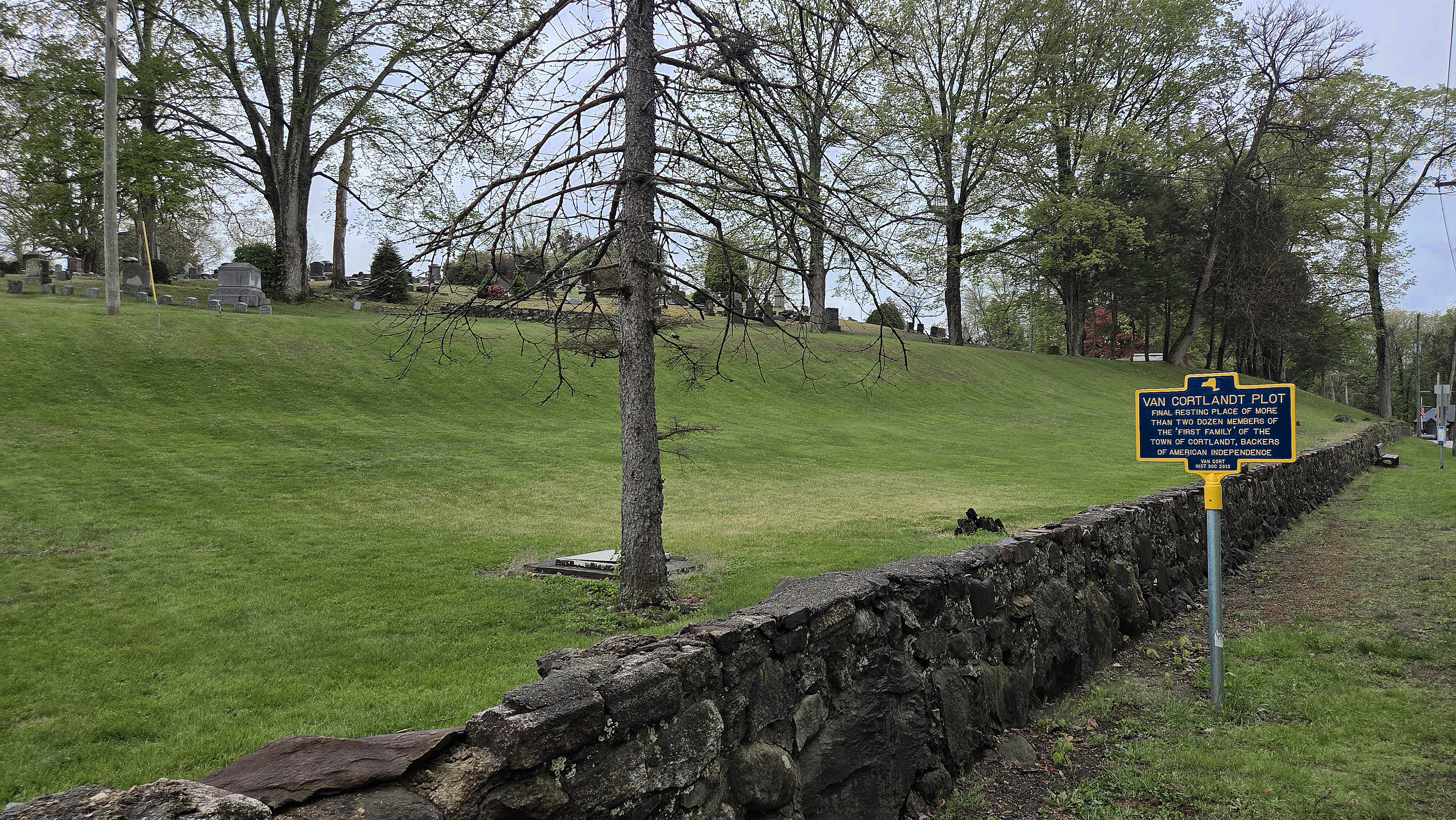
Marker for Van Cortlandt family plot at Hillside Cemetery

== History ==
The name "Cortlandt Manor" derives from the history of Westchester County. Until the Revolutionary War, Westchester County was split into six manors, one of which was van Cortlandt Manor of the Van Cortlandt family.

Until 1991, this area shared a mailing address and ZIP Code (10566) with the city of Peekskill. Although it now has its own ZIP code, 10567, many directories and censuses still do not include Cortlandt Manor, because it is an unincorporated section of the Town of Cortlandt. The 10567 ZIP code was created by the US Postal Service to differentiate this part of the Town of Cortlandt from Cortland, New York, which is located hours away in upstate New York.

== Education ==
Cortlandt Manor residents are served by Croton-Harmon Union Free School District, Hendrick Hudson Central School District, Lakeland Central School District, and Putnam Valley Central School District. Two schools in Hendrick Hudson Central School District are located in Cortlandt Manor: Furnace Woods Elementary School and Blue Mountain Middle School, which are separated by several soccer fields. Two of the Lakeland Central School District schools are located in Cortlandt Manor: Van Cortlandtville Elementary School and Walter Panas High School.

== National Register of Historic Places ==
The Aaron Copland House was listed on the National Register of Historic Places as a National Historic Landmark in 1973.

The Van Cortlandt Upper Manor House is located off Oregon Road in Cortlandt just outside the Peekskill city limits. The Upper Manor House was part of the estate of Stephanus Van Cortlandt, the colonial aristocrat and patroon who owned nearly all of northern Westchester County in the late 17th century. The more familiar centerpiece of the old estate, Van Cortlandt Manor, is located in the nearby village of Croton-on-Hudson.

== Notable people ==
- John Abercrombie, American jazz guitarist
- Bob Baldwin, American jazz musician; graduated from Walter Panas High School in 1978
- Elton Brand, former NBA player
- Aaron Copland, American composer
- Jackie Gleason, comedian and actor
