= Stephanus Van Cortlandt =

Mayor of New York City (1677–78, 1686–88)

Stephanus van Cortlandt

18th Mayor of New York City
- In office 1686–1688
- Governor: Thomas Dongan
- Preceded by: Nicholas Bayard
- Succeeded by: Peter Delanoy

11th Mayor of New York City
- In office 1677–1678
- Governor: Edmund Andros
- Preceded by: Nicholas De Mayer
- Succeeded by: Thomas Delavall

Personal details
- Born: May 7, 1643 New Amsterdam, New Netherland (Modern-day Lower Manhattan)
- Died: November 25, 1700 (aged 57) New York, New York
- Spouse: Gertruj van Schuyler
- Children: 5

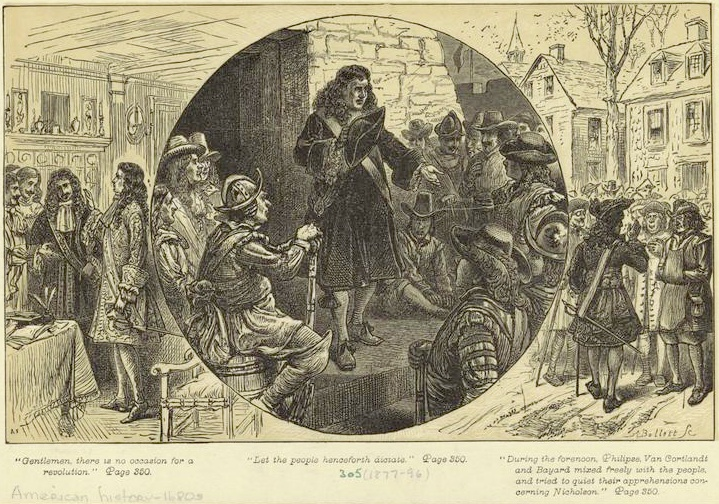
Depiction of New York City counsellors van Cortlandt, Nicholas Bayard, and Frederick Philipse quieting crowds during Leisler's Rebellion

Stephanus van Cortlandt (May 7, 1643 – November 25, 1700) was the first native-born mayor of New York City, a position which he held from 1677 to 1678 and from 1686 to 1688. He was the patroon of van Cortlandt Manor and was on the governor's executive council from 1691 to 1700. He was the first resident of Sagtikos Manor in West Bay Shore on Long Island, which was built around 1697. A number of his descendants married English military leaders and Loyalists active in the American Revolution, and their descendants became prominent members of English society.

== Early life ==
Stephanus van Cortlandt was born on May 7, 1643, the son of Captain Olof Stevense van Cortlandt. His father had been born at Wijk bij Duurstede, in the Dutch Republic, and in 1637 arrived in New Amsterdam. Beginning as a soldier and bookkeeper, Olof Stevense van Cortland rose to high office in the colonial service of the Dutch West India Company, serving many terms as burgomaster and alderman before dying in 1684. His mother was Annetje (née Loockermans) van Cortlandt (born 17 March 1618 in Turnhout, Margraviate of Antwerp, Duchy of Brabant, Spanish Netherlands), nicknamed "Anneken", later anglicized as "Anna", who may have been the person who began the "Santa Claus" tradition in America.

His parents had four children: Stephanus van Cortlandt (1643–1700); Jacobus van Cortlandt (1658–1739), who married Eva de Vries Philipse (born 1660); Maria van Cortlandt, who married Jeremias van Rensselaer (1632–1674); and Catherine van Cortlandt, who married firstly Johannes Derval and secondly, after his death, Frederick Philipse (1626–1702), the first lord of Philipsborough Manor (later, the common spelling would change to "Philipsburg"). Philipse was previously married to Margaret Hardenbroeck (1637–1691) and during that marriage, had adopted her daughter, Eva de Vries (born 1660), who thus took the name of Philipse. Eva's father and Margaret's first husband was Peter Rudolphus de Vries (died 1661).

== Career ==
In 1668, he was appointed ensign of one of the militia companies of New York City. In 1677, he was appointed by the English Governor of the Province of New York to a two-year term as mayor of New York City, the first who had been born in America. Although of Dutch parentage, he was reportedly appointed due to his intelligence, and social position in the community. In 1685, he joined partners Francis Rombouts and Jacobus Kip in being awarded what became known as the Rombout Patent to lands along the Hudson River in what is today's southern Dutchess County.

During his time in office, van Cortland remained an adherent of the aristocratic Whig party, especially during Leisler's Rebellion from 1689 to 1691. When Delanoy, the Leisler candidate, was elected to the mayoralty, in place of Van Cortland, the latter refused to deliver up the city seal. It has been said that when a committee came to his home, his wife shut the door in their faces.

== Personal life ==
The coat of arms of Stephanus Van Cortlandt

Van Cortlandt married Gertruj van Schuyler (b. 1654), the daughter of Philip Pieterse Schuyler and the sister of Pieter Schuyler (a colonial governor of New York and mayor of Albany). They lived at the "Waterside," on the present line of Pearl street, near Broad, where he engaged in business as a merchant. Together, they had:

- Johannes Van Cortlandt (1672–1702), who married Anna Maria Van Schaick.
  - Gertrude Van Cortlandt (1697–1766), who married Philip Verplanck, a grandson of Gulian Verplanck.
- Margaretta Van Cortlandt (b. 1674), who married Judge Samuel Bayard, the son of Nicholas Bayard and a descendant of the Stuyvesant family. A number of their descendants were Loyalists who relocated to England.
- Anne van Cortlandt (1676–1724), who married Stephen DeLancey (1663–1741).
- Catherine Van Cortlandt, who married New Jersey politician Andrew Johnston (1694-1762), the son of John Johnstone (1661–1732), the 32nd Mayor of New York City.
- Elizabeth Van Cortlandt, who married the Rev. William Skinner.
- Philip Van Cortlandt (1683–1746), who married Catherine de Peyster (1688-1766), daughter of Abraham de Peyster the 20th Mayor of New York City and his wife Catharine de Peyster. Philip and Catherine had six children:
  - Stephen (1711–1756), who married Mary Walton Ricketts in 1738.
  - Abraham (1713–1745)
  - Philip (1715–1745)
  - John (1718–1747)
  - Pierre Van Cortlandt (1721–1814), first Lt. Governor of the State of New York, who married his second cousin, Joanna Livingston (1722–1808), daughter of Cornelia Beekman (1693–1742), niece of Gerardus Beekman and granddaughter of Wilhelmus Beekman, and Gilbert Livingston (1690–1746), a son of Robert Livingston the Elder and Alida Schuyler;
  - Catherine Van Cortlandt (1725–1735), who died young.
- Gertrude (1688–1777), who married Henry Beekman in 1726.

Stephanus Van Cortlandt died in New York on November 25, 1700.

=== Descendants ===
His granddaughter, Gertrude Bayard, married Peter Kemble (1704–1789), a prominent New Jersey businessman and politician, and his great-granddaughter, Margaret Kemble (1734–1824), married Thomas Gage (1718/19–1787) who was General of the British Army during the American Revolutionary War. Descendants of this union are found in England, including amongst the Viscount Gages and the noble Bertie family in England (including those holding the title of Earls of Abingdon).

A grandson, James DeLancey (1703–1760) became New York Governor, and granddaughter Susannah DeLancey (1707–1771) married Vice-Admiral Sir Peter Warren (1703–1752). Another grandson, Oliver De Lancey Sr. (1718–1785) married Phila Franks, daughter of a prominent New York Jewish family.

Grandson, Lt. General William Skinner, was an American Revolutionary Loyalist whose son, Brig. Gen. Cortlandt Skinner (1727–1799) was also a Loyalist who married Elizabeth Kearney (1731–1810). Another grandson, Pierre Van Cortlandt (1721–1814) was the 1st Lieutenant Governor of New York who married to Joanna Livingston (granddaughter of Robert Livingston). Their descendants include Philip Van Cortlandt (1749-1831) and Pierre Van Cortlandt, Jr. (1762–1848).

It was revealed on a 2024 episode of Finding Your Roots that the American writer, director, actor, and producer Lena Dunham (b. 1986) is a descendant of Stephanus van Cortlandt.
