= William Paterson Van Rensselaer =

American attorney and landowner

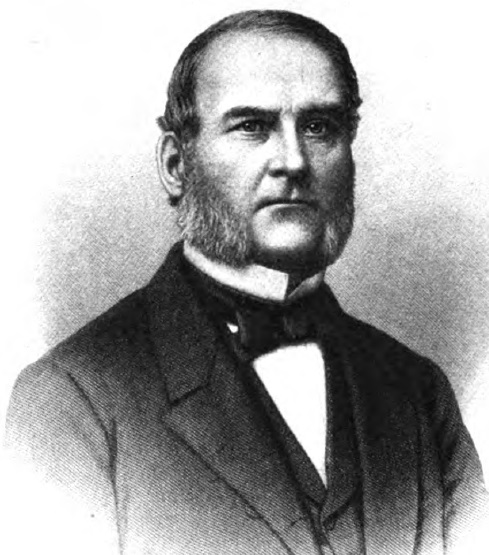
- From 1918's The Bar of Rye Township, Westchester County, New York
- Born: March 6, 1805; Albany, New York
- Died: November 13, 1872 (aged 67); New York City, New York
- Resting place: Green-Wood Cemetery, Brooklyn, New York
- Education: Yale College
- Occupation: Attorney
- Spouses: Eliza Bayard Rogers (m. 1833; died 1835) Sarah Rogers (m. 1839)
- Children: 9
- Parent(s): Stephen Van Rensselaer III; Cornelia Paterson
- Relatives: See Van Rensselaer family

William Paterson Van Rensselaer (March 6, 1805 – November 13, 1872) was an American attorney, landowner, and businessman from New York.

== Early life ==
Van Rensselaer was born on March 6, 1805, at the Van Rensselaer Manor House in Albany, New York. He was the eldest son of Gen. Stephen Van Rensselaer and, his second wife, Cornelia Bell Paterson. Among his siblings were the Rev. Cortlandt Van Rensselaer (father of Alexander Van Rensselaer), and U.S. Representative Henry Bell Van Rensselaer, who was a brigadier general in the Union Army during the American Civil War.

His paternal grandparents were Stephen van Rensselaer II, the 9th patroon of Rensselaerswyck, and Catharina (née Livingston) Van Rensselaer (daughter of Philip Livingston, a signer of the Declaration of Independence). After his grandfather's death in 1769, his grandmother married the Rev. Eilardus Westerlo. His maternal grandparents were Cornelia (née Bell) Paterson and William Paterson, the 2nd Governor of New Jersey, U.S. Senator, and later, an Associate Justice of the Supreme Court of the United States appointed by President George Washington.

After a preparatory education, he attended Yale College, graduating in the class of 1824. Following his graduation, Van Rensselaer was appointed as aide-de-camp on the military staff of Governor DeWitt Clinton with the rank of colonel.

== Career ==
After graduating from Yale, Van Rensselaer went to Edinburgh, Scotland for four years to study law, followed by additional studies in Paris. After returning to the United States he studied law with Peter A. Jay, attained admission to the bar, and practiced in New York City.

He was known as "a scholarly man, with intellectual tastes, eminent as a philanthropist" and "was regarded widely as an ideal Christian gentleman." He was a director of the Port Chester Savings Bank, which was founded in 1865.

=== Manor of Rensselaerswyck and Anti-Rent War ===
Following his father's death in 1839, Van Rensselaer together with his elder half-brother, Stephen Van Rensselaer IV, began to collect past due rents from his father's tenants. His father, who was born to incredible wealth, had his estate reduced significantly during the Panic of 1837, and in his will, directed his heirs to collect outstanding rents and "quarter sale" payments to apply to his estate's debts. The heirs' efforts to collect, and refusal to negotiate with the renters, became the primary cause of a tenants' revolt known as the Anti-Rent War. After several court battles and election of Anti-Rent politicians, the New York Constitution of 1846 added provisions for tenants' rights which abolished feudal tenures and outlawed leases longer than twelve years, which led to the dissolution and sale of the patroon's lands.

Upon the death of his elder-half brother in 1868, he inherited about 2,500 acres between the Troy and Shaker roads, north of the Van Rensselaer Manor House, while the Manor House and US$15,000 (equivalent to $400,000 in 2025) a year were left his brother's widow. William also inherited the c. 1793-95 Gilbert Stuart portrait of his father which William left to his eldest surviving son Kiliaen, who sold the portrait to art collector Thomas B. Clarke in 1919. The Clarke collection, including the portrait, was later acquired by The A. W. Mellon Educational and Charitable Trust, which gifted the work to The National Gallery of Art in 1942.

== Personal life ==
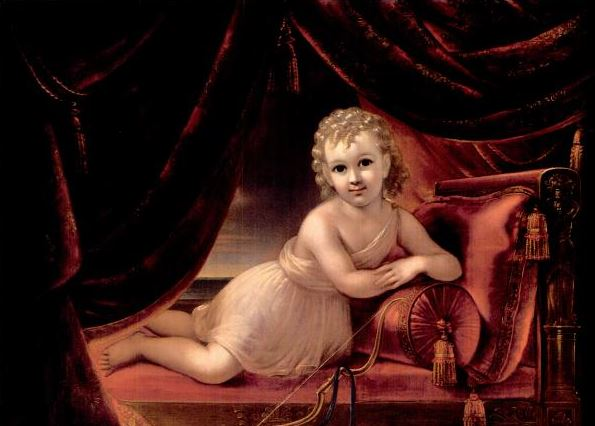
Portrait of a Child as Cupid, a portrait of Van Rensselaer's eldest son, William Paterson Van Rensselaer Jr., painted by Francesco Anelli, c. 1836–37

William married twice and had nine children. On May 13, 1833, Van Rensselaer was married to Eliza Bayard Rogers (1811–1835) by the Rev. Dr. Wainwright in New York City. Eliza was a daughter of Benjamin Woolsey Rogers and Susan (née Bayard) Rogers. Her maternal grandparents were William Bayard Jr. and Elizabeth (née Cornell) Bayard and her aunt, Harriet Elizabeth Bayard, was the wife of Stephen Van Rensselaer IV, William's elder half-brother from his father's first marriage to Margaret "Peggy" Schuyler (daughter of Gen. Philip Schuyler). Before her death in Matanzas, Cuba in 1835, where she had gone to improve her heath, they were the parents of one child:

- William Paterson Van Rensselaer Jr. (1834–1854), who died unmarried.

After her death in 1835, he married her older sister, Sarah Rogers (1810–1887) on April 4, 1839. Together, they were the parents of eight children:

- Susan Bayard Van Rensselaer (1840–1863), who died unmarried.
- Cornelia Van Rensselaer (1841–1913), who married Harvard lawyer John Erving, son of Col. John Erving, in 1862.
- Walter Stephen Van Rensselaer (1843–1865), who died unmarried.
- Kiliaen Van Rensselaer (1845–1905), who married Olivia Phelps Atterbury, a daughter of Benjamin Bakewell Atterbury, in 1870.
- Sarah Elizabeth Van Rensselaer (1847–1859), who died young.
- Arthur Van Rensselaer (1848–1869), who died unmarried.
- Catharine Goodhue Van Rensselaer (1850–1929), who married the Rev. Anson Greene Phelps Atterbury, also a son of B. B. Atterbury, in 1891.
- Eleanor Cecilia Van Rensselaer (1853–1926), who married Hamilton Rogers Fairfax.

Van Rensselaer died on November 13, 1872, in New York City. After a funeral at the Presbyterian Church at Fifth Avenue and 19th Street in Manhattan, he was buried at Green-Wood Cemetery in Brooklyn. His widow Sarah died at her home in Manursing Island in 1898.

=== Beverwyck Manor ===
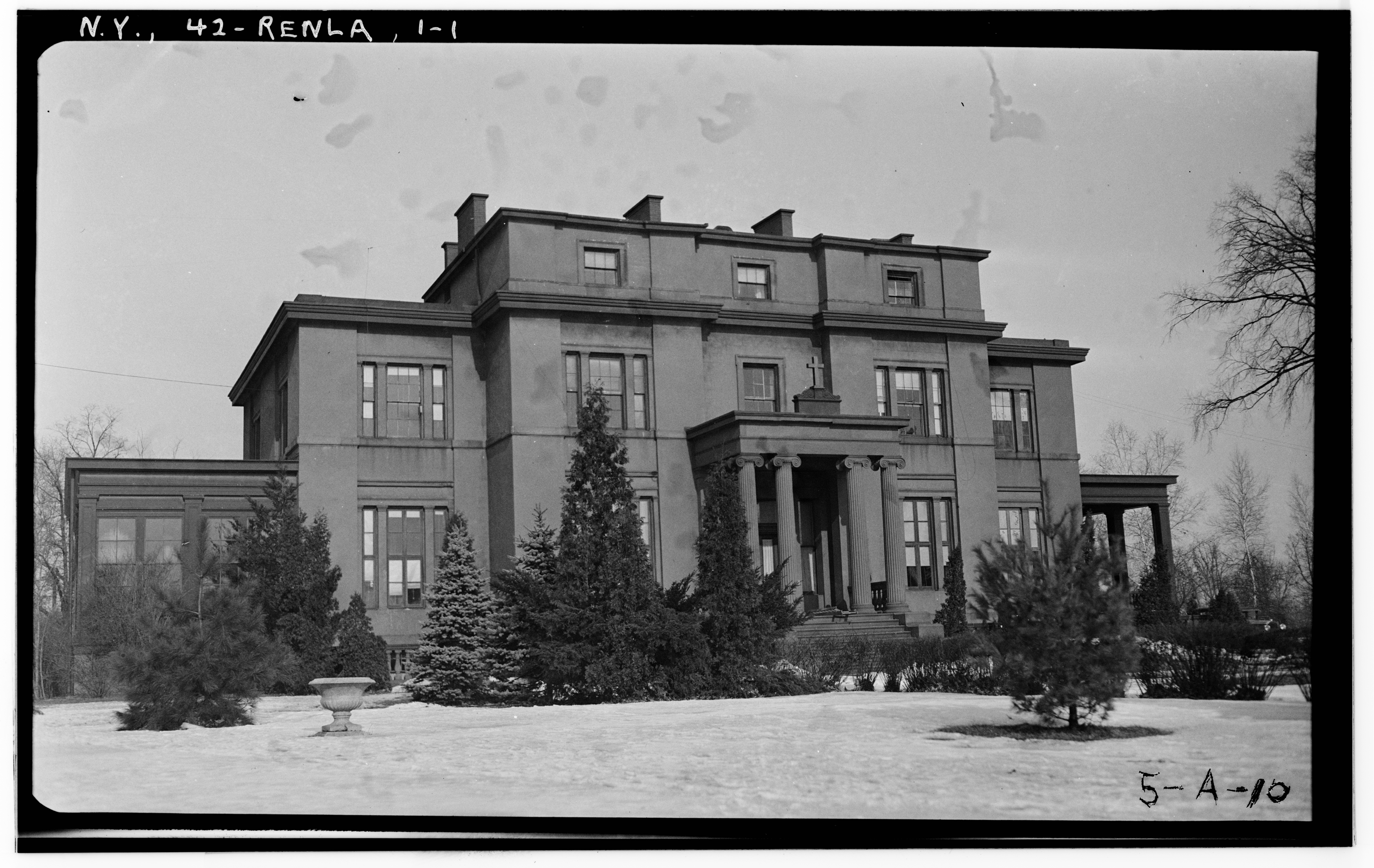
Van Rensselaer's Beverwyck Manor

Around 1840, he built Beverwyck Manor on the "brow of the wooded hill on the east side of the Hudson opposite the northern end of Albany." There, William "laid out the extensive grounds with the idea of making the place one of the finest estates in the entire state. He furnished the interior with objects of art gathered abroad, and his library was a notable feature of his home." On the southern side of the house, he built a large conservatory. The house sat upon a plateau which descended to the Hudson with a clear view of Albany and the Catskill Mountains in the distance. Following the Anti-Rent War, Van Rensselaer left Beverwyck to live in New York City and at Manursing Island in Rye, New York. Beverwyck Manor was vacant, but overseen by caretakers, for twenty-five years before it was purchased by Paul Forbes, later being known as "Forbes Manor."
