= General Rensselaer =

General Rensselaer may refer to:

- Robert Van Rensselaer (1740–1802), New York Militia brigadier general in the American Revolutionary War
- Stephen Van Rensselaer (1764–1839), New York Militia major general
- Stephen Van Rensselaer IV (1789–1868), New York Militia major general
