= Smith A. Boughton =

American physician and political activist from Rensselaer County, New York

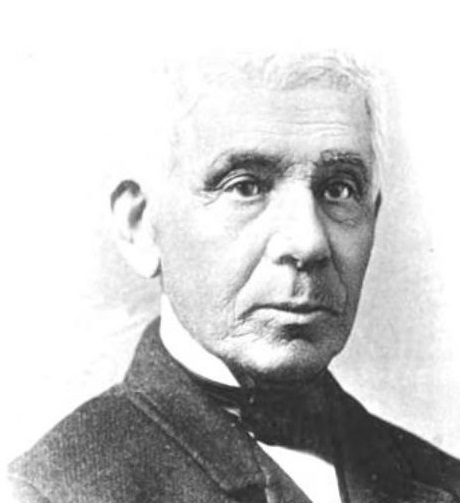
- From 1890's Bouton--Boughton Family: Descendants of John Boution, a Native of France
- Born: September 1, 1810; Stephentown, New York
- Died: November 14, 1888 (aged 78); Nassau, New York
- Resting place: Sand Lake Union Cemetery, Sand Lake, New York
- Education: Castleton Medical College
- Occupations: Physician; Farmer
- Known for: Leader in the Anti-Rent War
- Spouse: Mary Bailey (m. 1838)
- Children: 1

Signature
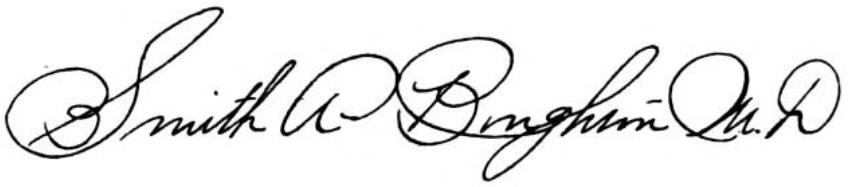

Smith A. Boughton (September 1, 1810 – November 14, 1888) was an American medical doctor and political activist. Nicknamed "Big Thunder", he was best known as one of the leaders of upstate New York's Anti-Rent War in the 1830s and 1840s.

== Early life ==
Smith Azer Boughton was born in Stephentown, New York on September 1, 1810, the son of Azer and Elizabeth (Nickerson) Boughton. His family moved to Rensselaerville when he was a baby, and he attended schools in Rensselaerville and the academy in Cambridge. He then studied medicine at Vermont's Castleton Medical College, from which he graduated in 1831. (Note: Several sources incorrectly state that Boughton graduated from Middlebury College.) He practiced in several upstate New York towns, including Saratoga Springs, Glens Falls, and Delhi. He took part in the 1837 Lower Canada Rebellion, when residents of southern Quebec attempted to obtain greater representation in Canada's British colonial government.

After his experience in Canada, in 1838 Boughton married Mary Bailey, a resident of Alps, a hamlet in the Rensselaer County town of Nassau. They were the parents of a son, Artemus Bailey Boughton (1843-1900). Boughton settled in Alps, where he farmed and practiced medicine.

Alps was part of the Manor of Rensselaerswyck, a multi-county estate owned by Stephen Van Rensselaer III, who was the manor's patroon. When Van Rensselaer inherited the manor, he developed the land by offering lifetime leases to prospective farmers; by not having to make a cash payment up front as in a purchase, and instead paying the relatively moderate annual rent Van Rensselaer charged, tenants were able to devote more of their capital to improving their farms and making them more productive.

Van Rensselaer generally proved to be a benevolent landlord; when tenants fell into arrears, rather than evicting them he usually preferred accepting partial payment, or goods and services in lieu of cash. However, the lifetime leases Van Rensselaer granted also included a "quarter sale" provision; tenants who sold their leases had to pay him twenty-five percent of the sale price or one additional year's rent. Many of Van Rensselaer's tenants experienced financial reversals during the Panic of 1837; when Van Rensselaer died in 1839, his tenants anticipated that their debts to him would be forgiven. Instead, Van Rensselaer's will required his heirs, including Stephen Van Rensselaer IV, to pay the debts he had incurred in the 1837 panic by collecting past due rents and quarter sale payments.

== Anti-Rent War ==
The Rensselaerwyck manor tenants could not pay the amounts the Van Rensselaer heirs demanded, and the heirs would not agree to a favorable repayment schedule, so the tenants revolted. The holders of several other patroonships had similar arrangements with their tenants, and the anti-rent dispute expanded to include them. The conflict became known as the Anti-Rent War, and it took place from 1839 to 1845. The anti-renters declared independence from the manor system, resisted tax collectors, opposed sheriffs who attempted to foreclose on tenants' farms, and advocated for land reform that would free them of lifetime obligations to the patroons.

Boughton became a leader of the anti-rent movement, and was nicknamed "Big Thunder" for his oratorical skills. (Note: Several other individuals have been suggested as the corresponding "Little Thunder", including Peter Finkle, Frank Abbott, and Mortimer C. Belding.) The activities of the anti-renters were sometimes peaceful, but sometimes turned violent, and on several occasions anti-renters disguised themselves as American Indians ("Calico Indians") in order to avoid being identified. After several violent anti-rent events took place in Columbia County, in December 1844 Boughton was arrested and charged with theft of legal documents, assault, riot, and conspiracy. Lack of evidence resulted in dismissal of several charges at his March 1845 trial. At a second trial in September, he was convicted of robbery and other offenses, and received a life sentence.

Governor Silas Wright, a Democrat, had taken the side of the patroons during the Anti-Rent War. During the 1846 campaign, Whig nominee John Young promised that if he was elected he would pardon Boughton and other anti-renters, and enact land reform. Young was elected, and in 1847 he pardoned Boughton and other leaders of the anti-renters. The New York State Legislature resolved the dispute by passing land reform laws which ended the manor system.

== Later life ==
After being pardoned, Boughton had his citizenship and medical license restored. He practiced medicine and farmed in Alps, and took part in other reform movements including opposition to slavery. He died in Alps on November 14, 1888. Boughton was buried at Sand Lake Union Cemetery in Sand Lake, New York.
