= Boudinot C. Atterbury =

- Born: Boudinot Currie Atterbury; June 10, 1852; Manchester, England
- Died: May 21, 1930 (aged 77); Altamonte Springs, Florida
- Education: Phillips Academy; Yale University; Bellevue Hospital Medical College
- Spouse: Mary Josephine Lowrie (m. 1890; died 1910)
- Children: Boudinot Bakewell Atterbury; Marguerite Atterbury
- Parent(s): Benjamin Bakewell Atterbury; Olivia Phelps Atterbury.
- Relatives: Anson Greene Phelps (grandfather); Olivia Egleston (grandmother)

Boudinot Currie Atterbury (June 10, 1852 – May 21, 1930), from a wealthy New York family, trained to be a medical doctor and worked with the Presbyterian missions in China and later with Chinese communities in the United States.

== Early life ==
Atterbury was born in Manchester, England, on June 10, 1852. He was a son of Benjamin Bakewell Atterbury (1815–1900) and Olivia Eggleston (née Phelps) Atterbury (1821–1894). His father was a New York merchant with a shipping agency in Manchester. His brother, Anson Greene Phelps Atterbury, and one of his sisters, Olivia Phelps Atterbury, married into the Van Rensselaer family, who had relatives working in China (some of whom were killed in the Boxer uprising).

His maternal grandparents were Anson Greene Phelps and Olivia Egleston. Boudinot Atterbury's uncles included James Boulter Stokes, Daniel James, and William Earle Dodge, wealthy families that supported and funded his missionary work in China. Among his ancestors was Bishop Francis Atterbury as well as his grand-uncle, Elias Boudinot, first president of the Continental Congress.

He attended Phillips Academy class of 1869 before going to Yale, leaving as a non-graduate in 1873. After three years work experience he attended medical school under Dr. Frank Hastings Hamilton at Bellevue Hospital from where he graduated with a medical degree in 1878. He expanded his medical knowledge, working in New York, Paris and Palestine.

== Career ==
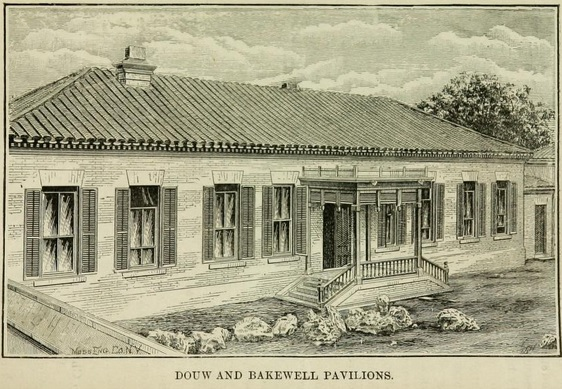
Douw & Bakewell Pavilions Peking Hospital 1886

In 1879, Atterbury moved to China as a medical missionary. He built a hospital in Peking with funding from family and friends, treating the poor and training Chinese medical students. Another of his sponsors was Deborah Matilda Douw, who was also related via the Van Rensselaer connection. She survived the uprising by disguising herself in traditional Chinese clothing. Douw had funded a pavilion for female patients at the hospital and paid for a female physician for the facility. In 1896 he was awarded the Order of the Double Dragon by the Dowager Empress for his services during the First Sino-Japanese War of 1894.

In 1894 Atterbury attended the medical mission at Pao-ting-fu whilst the resident doctor took leave. During his tenure he built, at his own expense, a dispensary and additional hospital rooms. He also donated funds at a later date for equipment to the hospital.

Due to ill health he left China in about 1898 and did not return, but continued his work amongst the Chinese population in Pasadena, Los Angeles and Brooklyn. In 1900 several of his colleagues in China were killed during the Boxer uprising.

== Personal life ==
On August 18, 1890, Atterbury was married to Mary Josephine Lowrie (1858–1910) at Tianjin, China by the Rev. J.W. Lowrie, the bride's brother. Mary was born in China, the daughter of missionaries Amelia and Rev. Reuben Post Lowrie, who lived and worked there, but was educated in America. Together, they were the parents of Boudinot Bakewell Atterbury (1892–1976), a businessman who married Ruth Rand, a daughter of Lyman Fiske Rand and sister to Gertrude Rand. Marguerite "Daisy" Atterbury (1896–1988), and Olive Atterbury (1898–1962).

His wife Josephine died in Pasadena in 1910 and he died on May 21, 1930, in Altamonte Springs, Florida. After his death, his daughter Daisy returned to China to continue the missionary work and was interned in the Japanese Weihsien Compound during World War II (repatriated 1943).
