= Francesco Anelli =

Italian-American painter

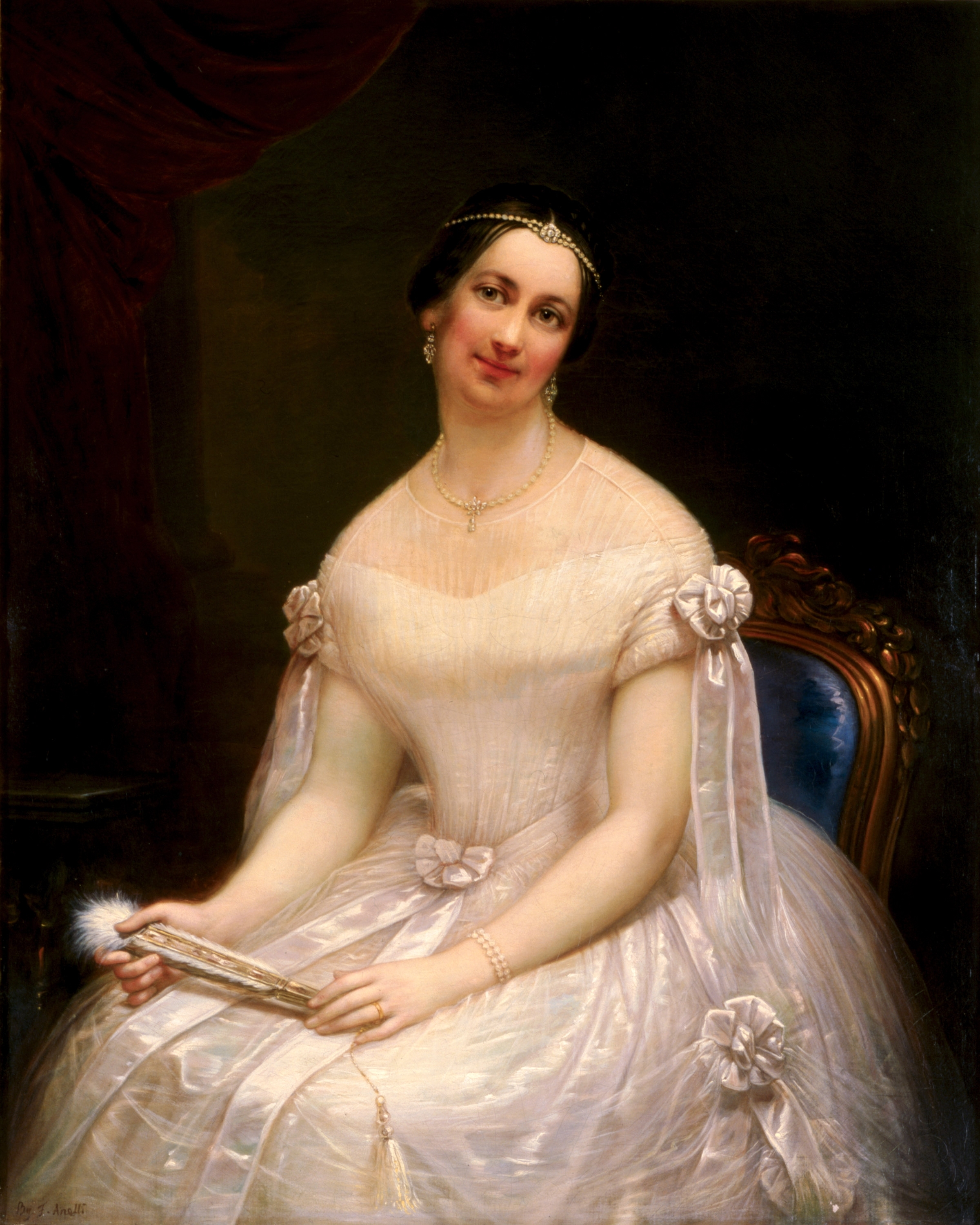
Anelli's oil portrait of President John Tyler's second wife, Julia Gardiner Tyler

Francesco Anelli (1805–1878) was an Italian-American Romantic period artist. He is best known for his oil painting that depicts Julia Gardiner Tyler, the second wife of the 10th U.S. President John Tyler. Anelli's monumental masterpiece and most acclaimed painting, entitled The End of the World, has been lost.

== Early life ==
Anelli was quite celebrated in his own time, especially for his monumental work called The End of the World. He was born in Italy and emigrated to New York City from Milan in about 1835. Almost immediately Anelli attracted a good deal of attention, not for his portraits, but for his gigantic apocalyptic historical pictures, beginning with his rendering of a family group during the Deluge, which was the principal work in an exhibition of his pictures shown in rooms at the New York Athenaeum on Chambers Street at the end of 1836.

== Portrait style ==
Anelli's portrait style is distinctive—in its sharp linearity, bright lighting, and highly reflective surfaces—and appears the antithesis of the dominant romantic approach to portraiture practiced contemporaneously by Thomas Sully (1783–1872), Henry Inman (1801–1846), and Samuel F. B. Morse (1791–1872). Anelli's manner corresponded to that practiced by other immigrant Italian and German painters such as Spiridione Gambardella (active 1838–39), Gherlando Marsiglia (1792–1850), and Christian Mayr (about 1805–1851), whose works are all relatively little known today. In 1839 the painter-critic John Kenrick Fisher (born 1807) distinguished these portraitists, along with Charles Cromwell Ingham (1796–1863), as the practitioners of an exceptional and distinctive style, which he denounced as "prompted and encouraged by an aberration of the public taste."

In 1843 Anelli had on his easel Conrad and Medora (unlocated) taken from Lord Byron's Corsair, while his most acclaimed painting was the Opening of the Sixth Seal, or The End of the World (unlocated), which was shown at the Apollo Rooms at 410 Broadway in New York City in April 1844. This picture—which offered the light and promise of Christianity as humanity's only spiritual salvation in the face of utter annihilation—displayed lurid light effects complete with dark clouds, bloody skies and lightning, and centered on a figure representing the church, or the spouse of Christ, with a crumbling temple and a bewildered and terrified multitude of sinners, both repentant and unrepentant, in a "grand catastrophe". The picture, hailed in the press as the largest painting in America—measuring 23 feet by 19 feet—was described as a masterwork and considered the "Boldest attempt at the highest effect in art, which has yet been made on this side of the Atlantic." Anelli toured his masterwork through the northeastern United States and continued to create allegorical compositions derived from historical and biblical sources.

In the early decades of the 19th century, apocalyptic fascination was manifest visually by such artists as Benjamin West, Rembrandt Peale, and Washington Allston. The End of the World, which was exhibited in New York, Boston, Portland, Maine, and Brooklyn from 1844 through at least 1850, attests to this continued apocalyptic tradition. Anelli, whose stated aim was "to represent a great catastrophe to the world" and not "a doctrine", claimed he had no wish to engage in arguments with philosophers or naturalists concerning the particulars of this catastrophe.

== Diogenes Successful ==
In the New York Crystal Palace at the World's Fair—held in New York City in 1853—he showed Diogenes Successful (unlocated), wherein Diogenes had finally located his truly "honest man" in the person of George Washington.

== Boston Athenaeum, and the National Academy of Design ==
When Anelli first began to contribute paintings to the annual exhibitions held at the Boston Athenaeum and the National Academy of Design, New York, he showed only portraits. Probably the most notable of these is the depiction of Julia Gardiner Tyler (1820–1889), the second wife of the 10th U.S. President John Tyler.

== Portrait of a Child as Cupid ==
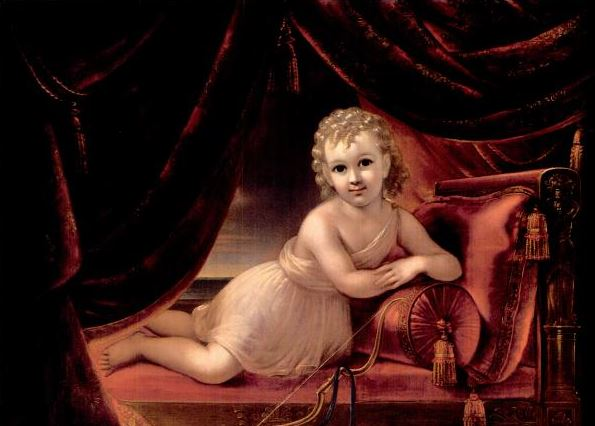
Anelli's oil painting, Portrait of a Child as Cupid, depicting young William Paterson Van Rensselaer, Jr., c. 1836–37

Anelli's Portrait of a Child as Cupid—depicting William Paterson Van Rensselaer, Jr.—was painted in New York City and was commissioned by the subject's father, William Paterson Van Rensselaer Sr. (1805–1872). The picture was lent by him in 1847 to the annual exhibition held by the Albany Gallery of Fine Arts, of which Van Rensselaer was an honorary member. The painting, which descended in the family, may have hung in the Rensselaer Manor House in Albany and almost certainly hung in both the Elk Street town house built by William Paterson Van Rensselaer, Sr., at the time of his first marriage in 1833 and then in Beverwyck, in Bath (now Rensselaer), New York, which Van Rensselaer built after inheriting the Rensselaerswyck estate lands on the east bank of the Hudson River, following the death of his father, Major General Stephen Van Rensselaer III, on 26 January 1839. During the late 1830s, Anelli also painted portraits of William Paterson Van Rensselaer, Jr. (Private Collection); his sister, Euphemia White Van Rensselaer (1816–1888; Private Collection); and his sister-in-law, Mary Rebecca Tallmadge Van Rensselaer (1817–1872; Albany Institute of History and Art).

Anelli's records of other sitters suggest that he drew his patronage from New York State citizens of upper classes. In Portrait of a Child as Cupid, Anelli presents Van Rensselaer, Jr. in a spectacularly theatrical manner, revealed triumphantly by the parting of the heavy red draperies. The Empire period ormolu daybed—with its gold embroidery and tassels—bespeaks high-style furniture such as that produced concurrently by Charles-Honoré Lannuier, Joseph Meeks (1771–1868), and Antoine-Gabriel Quervelle (1789–1856). With the bow and quiver of arrows by the side of the bed, the artist identifies the child with Cupid as a symbol of love, a conceit similar to that chosen later by William Henry Rinehart (1825–1874) in his statue of Henry Elliot Johnston, Jr., Cupid with a Bow, 1874 (National Museum of American Art in Washington, D.C.).

== Death ==
Anelli died in 1878. His diary is on display at the Frick Art Reference Library in New York City.

== Gallery ==
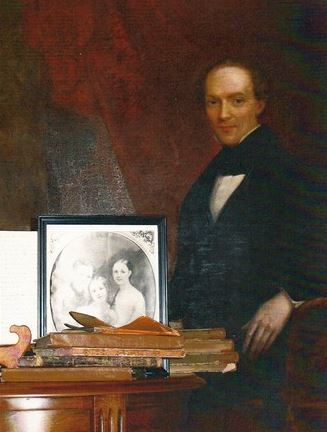
c. 1838 oil by Anelli of Garret Decker Hasbrouck (1810–1888)

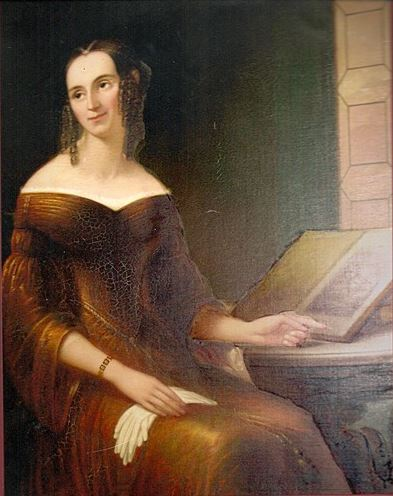
c. 1838 oil by Anelli of Julia Lawrence Hasbrouck (1809–1873)
