= Howard Townsend =

American physician

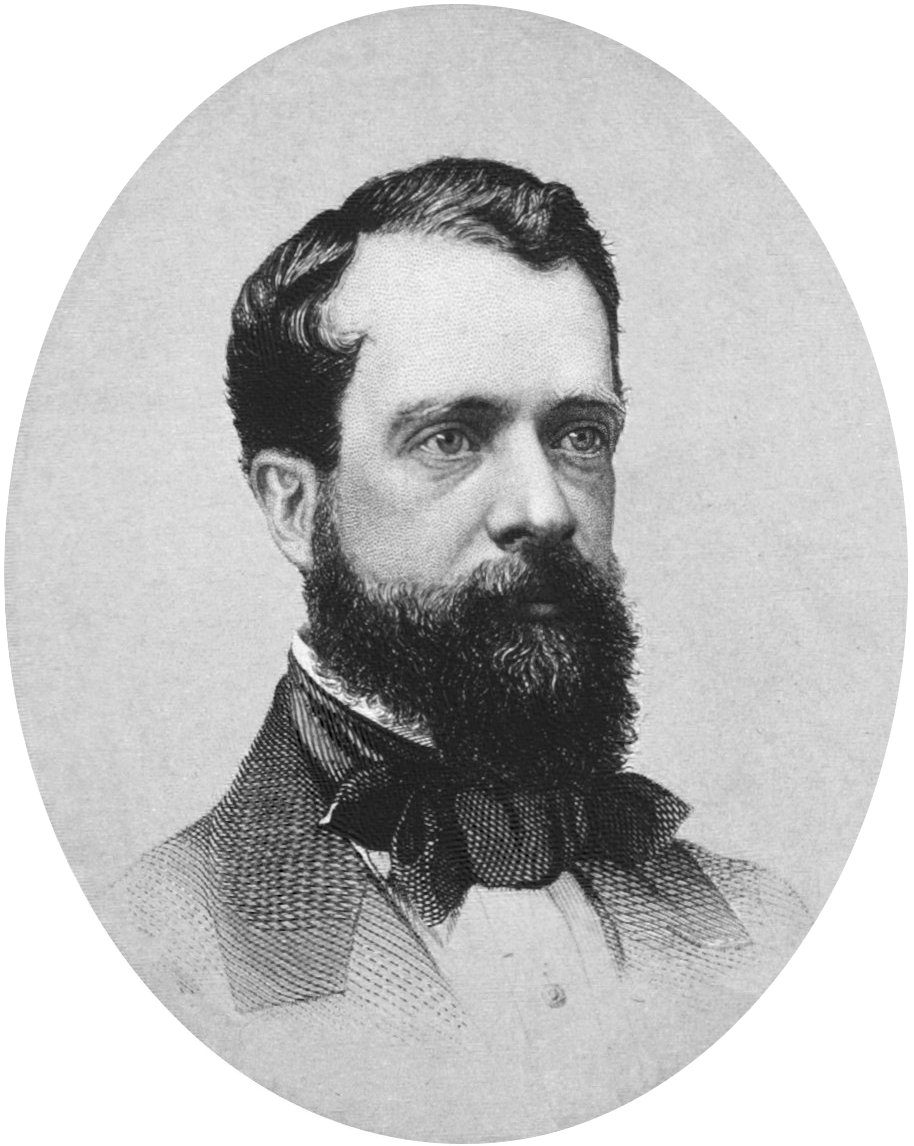
- Born: November 22, 1823
- Died: January 16, 1867 (aged 43); Albany, New York, US
- Resting place: Albany Rural Cemetery
- Education: The Albany Academy
- Alma mater: Union College; University of Pennsylvania
- Employer: Albany Medical College
- Spouse: Justine Van Rensselaer (m. 1853)
- Relatives: Franklin Townsend (brother); Frederick Townsend (brother); Robert Townsend (brother); Solomon Townsend (grandfather)

Howard Townsend (November 22, 1823 – January 16, 1867) was a medical doctor practicing in Albany, New York. He was a professor at the Albany Medical College and a member of the staff at the Albany Hospital.

== Early life ==
Doctor Howard Townsend was born in Albany on November 22, 1823. He was the son of Isaiah and Hannah (Townsend) Townsend. His father was an industrialist, having carried on the business of the Stirling Iron Works which forged the Hudson River Chain that prevented the British Royal Navy from sailing up the Hudson River during the American Revolution. Isaiah had transferred the business from the Stirling mines to Albany.

Dr. Townsend was the grandson of Solomon Townsend, a ship's captain during the American Revolution, and great-grandson of Samuel Townsend, a member of the New York provincial congress and of the committee appointed to prepare a form of government for the state of New York. His ancestors Henry Townsend and Henry's brother John immigrated to Massachusetts from Norfolk, England in 1640 and settled at Jamaica on Long Island, New York, and were founding members of Oyster Bay, Long Island.

Townsend had seven brothers and two sisters. There was a strong military bent in the family, as two brothers, Franklin Townsend and Frederick Townsend, were Adjutant Generals of New York in the mid 19th century, and another, Robert, served in the U.S. Navy, both on the side of the Union. His sister Mary, on the other hand, married General William H.T. Walker of the Confederate Army.

He attended school at The Albany Academy and at Poughkeepsie, and graduated from Union College in 1843.

== Medical career ==
After graduating from college Townsend commenced the study of medicine, for which he demonstrated an aptitude. He attended lectures at the Albany Medical College in 1844–5 and 1845–6, and in 1846–7 at the University of Pennsylvania, from which he received the degree of Doctor of Medicine in 1847.

After his graduation, he went to Paris, being a fluent speaker of French, where continued his medical studies. After visiting Italy and other countries of Europe, he returned to Albany in 1849 and commenced the practice of medicine, being appointed one of the physicians to the Albany Hospital.

=== Medical instruction ===
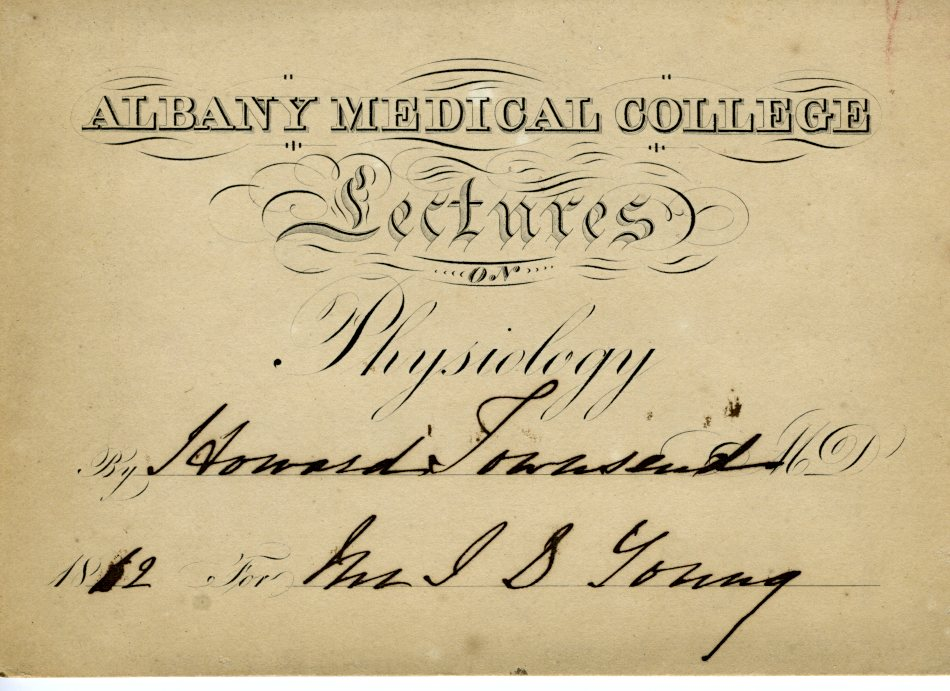
Ticket to admit one to a lecture by Dr. Howard Townsend at the Albany Medical College, 1852

In the autumn of 1852 Townsend was appointed a lecturing professor in the Albany Medical College in the area of obstetrics, which he taught for one course of lectures when he was transferred to the chair of Materia Medica. As a lecturer he was distinguished for his clearness and ability to impart a thorough knowledge of the subjects. He was noted for his ability to awaken enthusiasm in the students, and offering free access to the books of his personal library.

In addition to his regular medical lectures Townsend also lectured at the Albany Hospital, concentrating on accurate methods of investigating and diagnosing disease. Eventually Townsend became a trustee of the Albany Academy, a member of the Albany County Medical Society and of the Albany Institute.

== Personal ==
On February 2, 1853, Townsend married Miss Justine Van Rensselaer (1828–1912), daughter of General Stephen Van Rensselaer IV (1789–1868) and Harriet Elizabeth Van Rensselaer (née Bayard), at the Van Rensselaer Manor House in Albany, New York. Justine's paternal grandfather was Stephen Van Rensselaer III (1764–1839), the Lieutenant Governor of New York and a member of the United States House of Representatives, and his great-grandfather was Philip Schuyler, a general in the American Revolution and a United States Senator from New York. The Townsends had four children.

=== Public service ===
A few months before his death, he was appointed member of the Board of Public Instruction, (school commission) and became president of the Board of Education.

=== Death and legacy ===
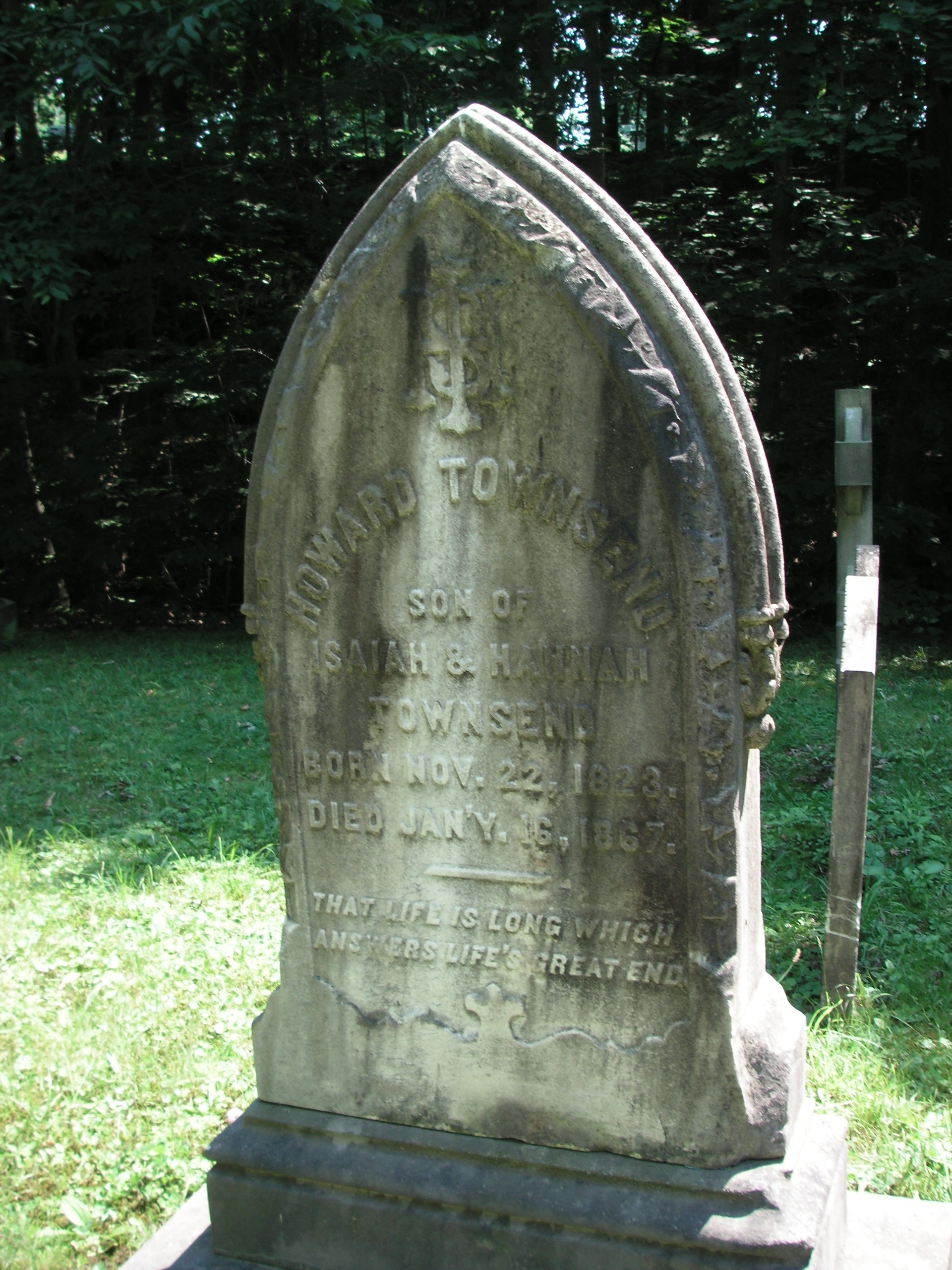
Gravestone of Howard Townsend at Albany Rural Cemetery, photographed July 2008

Townsend died at the age of 43 on January 16, 1867, following a brief illness, described as follows:

In December, 1866, after much fatigue in the performance of his duties at the college, he complained of langour and exhaustion, but not in a way to cause disquietude to his friends, till he was suddenly attacked with convulsions. These passed off, leaving him weak and dispirited, in which condition he remained about three weeks. He then began to exhibit unmistakable signs of serous cerebral disorder, and soon fell into a state of stupor, which continued till he died at his home, No. 15 Elk street,, in January, just one month from the date of the attack of convulsions. A post-mortem examination revealed the existence of two abscesses communicating with each other in the anterior lobe of the left cerebral hemisphere.

Townsend was interred at the Townsend family plot at the Albany Rural Cemetery, in Albany, New York. His wife, Justine (Van Rensselaer) Townsend, died at her home, No. 57 East Seventy-eighth street in New York City, on April 6, 1912.

Townsend's character and legacy was expressed in the following by his peers:

To understand what sort of man he was, ... an amiable and generous temper, he was always pleased to render services to his friends, at cost of personal sacrifice. He had a high sense of honor and fidelity, and was scrupulously just in his dealings. It is rare to find one who carries so steadily and continuously a sense of moral obligation into small as well as into great affairs.

Those who knew him speak of him as "a man of rare and singular beauty of character, gifted with a fine and genial temperament and the most cultivated tastes, endowed with almost feminine graces, yet with a robust and masculine understanding, he was one of the most polished gentlemen and one of the truest friends whom it was ever the fortune of his acquaintances to know. In the truest sense of the term, he was a scholar, and while possessing the broadest learning in his profession, his exquisite tastes led him also into various fields of art, literature and science, so that his culture was as comprehensive as it was deep and elegant."
