= Benjamin Bakewell Atterbury =

Benjamin Bakewell Atterbury (August 15, 1815 – May 2, 1900) was an American businessman and philanthropist.

== Early life ==
Atterbury was born on August 15, 1815, in Newark, New Jersey. He was one of eight siblings born to Lewis Atterbury (1779–1872) and Catharine (née Boudinot) Atterbury (1781–1877). Among his siblings were John Guest Atterbury, Julia Maria Atterbury (wife of Henry Clark Stimson), and the Rev. William Wallace Atterbury. His father, who was born at Castle Donington, in Leicestershire, England, emigrated to the U.S. with his uncle Benjamin Bakewell, founder of Bakewell Glass.

His paternal grandparents were Job Atterbury and Sarah (née Bakewell) Atterbury. His maternal grandparents were Catharine (née Smith) Boudinot (daughter of William Peartree Smith, a founder of Princeton University) and Elisha Boudinot, a Justice of the New Jersey Supreme Court who was the brother of Elias Boudinot, 2nd President of the Confederation Congress. Through his sister Julia, he was an uncle to prominent surgeon Lewis Atterbury Stimson and through his brother John, he was an uncle to Brig.-Gen. William Wallace Atterbury, president of the Pennsylvania Railroad.

== Career ==
At an early age, he went to New York City and engaged in business. He went into partnership with Amos Sawyer Thornton, Edward Johnson Cole Atterbury in the business of Commission Agents in Manchester. He retired in 1850 and then devoted most of his time to religious and philanthropic work. He was one of the founders of the Murray Hill Presbyterian Church. For fifty years, he was an officer of the House of Refuge on Randall's Island.

== Personal life ==
On April 21, 1847, Atterbury was married to Olivia Eggleston Phelps (1821–1894), a daughter of Olivia Egleston and Anson Green Phelps. Among her siblings were Elizabeth Woodbridge Phelps (wife of Daniel James), Melissa Phelps (wife of William E. Dodge), and Caroline Phelps (wife of James Boulter Stokes). Together, they were the parents of:

- Olivia Phelps Atterbury (1848–1923), who married Capt. Kiliaen Van Rensselaer (1845–1905), a son of William Paterson Van Rensselaer (son of Stephen Van Rensselaer).
- Boudinot Currie Atterbury (1852–1930), a doctor who became a missionary in China.
- Anson Greene Phelps Atterbury (1854–1931), a pastor of the 86th Street Methodist Church who married Catharine Goodhue Van Rensselaer, a daughter of William Paterson Van Rensselaer, in 1891.
- Melissa Dodge Atterbury (c. 1860–1933), a member of the Colonial Dames of America.

His wife died on March 30, 1894. Atterbury died at his residence in The Dakota on Central Park West in Manhattan on May 2, 1900.
