= Rensselaer Westerlo =

American politician (1776–1851)

United States House of Representatives from New York's 9th District
- In office March 4, 1817 – March 3, 1819
- Preceded by: John Lovett
- Succeeded by: Solomon Van Rensselaer

Personal details
- Born: May 6, 1776 Albany, Province of New York, British America
- Died: April 18, 1851 (aged 74) Albany, New York, U.S.
- Party: Federalist
- Spouse: Jane Lansing (m. 1805)
- Children: 6
- Parent(s): Eilardus Westerlo; Catherine Livingston
- Relatives: Stephen Van Rensselaer (half-brother); John Lansing Jr. (father-in-law)
- Education: Columbia College

Rensselaer Westerlo (May 6, 1776 – April 18, 1851) was a United States representative from New York and a member of the Livingston family.

== Early life ==
Rensselaer Westerlo was born on May 6, 1776, at the Van Rensselaer Manor House in Albany in the Province of New York. He was the son of Catherine Livingston (1745–1810) and her second husband Eilardus Westerlo (1738–1790). Catherine Livingston was the daughter of Philip Livingston (1716–1778), and widow of Stephen Van Rensselaer II, and the mother of Stephen Van Rensselaer. Westerlo's sister, Catherine Westerlo, married John Woodworth.

Westerlo graduated from Columbia College in New York City in 1795. He studied law, was admitted to the bar, and practiced.

== Career ==
Westerlo was active in the militia, and served as an aide to Stephen Van Rensselaer and commander of a cavalry regiment in the War of 1812. In 1818 he became commander of New York's 3rd Cavalry Brigade with the rank of Brigadier General.

Westerlo was elected as a Federalist to the Fifteenth Congress (March 4, 1817 – March 3, 1819). He was not a candidate for reelection and resumed the practice of law.

== Personal life ==
On May 5, 1805, he married Jane Lansing (1785–1871), daughter of Chancellor John Lansing Jr. Together, they had six children:

- Catherine Westerlo (1806–1890)
- Elizabeth Van Rensselaer Westerlo (b. 1816)
- Cornelia Lansing Westerlo (1826–1876)
- Mary Lansing Westerlo (1826–1876)
- Eliardus Westerlo (d. 1859)
- Joanna Westerlo

He died in Albany on April 18, 1851, and was interred at Albany Rural Cemetery.

U.S. House of Representatives
Preceded by John Lovett	Member of the U.S. House of Representatives from New York's 9th congressional district 1817–1819	Succeeded by Solomon Van Rensselaer
