= Deborah Matilda Douw =

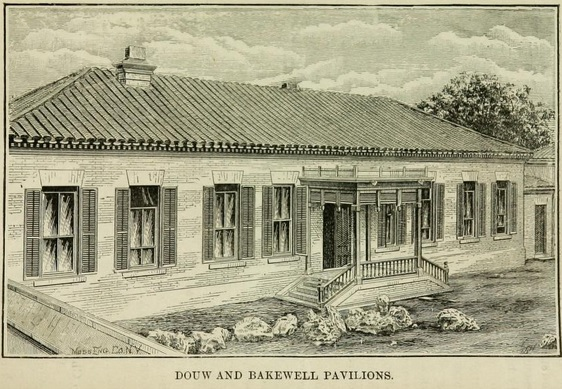
Douw & Bakewell Pavilions Peking Hospital 1886

Deborah Matilda Douw (1835-1911) funded and took part in missionary work in China. In 1900 she was caught up in the Boxer Rebellion.

Douw was born on April 19, 1835, the eldest of eight children. Her family home was Wolvenhoeck, Greenbush on the east bank of the Hudson. By intermarriage she was related to many of the old and influential families including: Van Rensselaer, Beekman, Ten Broeck, De Peyster, Van Cortlandt and Livingston.

In 1869 Douw made her first visit to China on behalf of the Woman's Union Missionary Society of America for Heathen Lands (WUMS). (Note: Later renamed the Woman's Union Missionary Society of America.) She went to Beijing with two other women, Mrs Catherine Bonney and Miss Emily Adams, to open a boarding school for girls. In 1881 the mission was moved to Shanghai at which time a day-school was added to the facility. WUMS was one of the first organisations to permit single women to carry out this type of missionary work. They played an important role, working with women in situations where the presence of male missionaries would be inappropriate or forbidden. Some years later Douw funded the building of a female pavilion at the Pekin Presbyterian Hospital and paid for the attendance of a female doctor for this same reason. The hospital was run by Boudinot Currie Atterbury, a Presbyterian doctor from a wealthy family in America. Douw, was related to Atterbury via the Van Rensselaer family and she became one of his largest sponsors.

Douw returned several times to China to continue her work. She set up a fund with the Woman’s Union Missionary Society of America for evangelistic work in Shanghai called the Douw Foundation. This supported two missionaries, a bible school and women teachers. She also funded her own Christian Alliance Mission in Beijing. In 1900 she was at the mission during the Boxer Rebellion when she and other missionaries were trapped in the foreign Legations. They were eventually rescued by a combined international force of troops and she returned to America, but never fully recovered from this experience and died in 1911.
