= Olivia Egleston =

American philanthropist

Olivia Egleston Phelps
- Born: Olivia Egleston; March 30, 1784; Middletown, Connecticut, U.S.
- Died: April 24, 1859 (aged 75); Manhattan, New York, U.S.
- Spouse: Anson Green Phelps
- Children: 8
- Parent(s): Elihu Egleston; Elizabeth Olcott Egleston
- Relatives: Anson Phelps Stokes (grandson); William E. D. Stokes (grandson)

Olivia Egleston Phelps (née Egleston; March 30, 1784 – April 24, 1859) was an American philanthropist who was the wife of businessman Anson Green Phelps, co-founder of the Phelps Dodge Company.

== Early life ==
Born in Middletown, Connecticut on March 30, 1784 to Elihu Egleston (d. 1803) and Elizabeth (née Olcott) Egleston (d. 1828), her maternal grandfather was George Olcott Jr. and her older siblings were Elizabeth Egleston, George Egleston, and Elihu Egleston Jr.

== Personal life ==
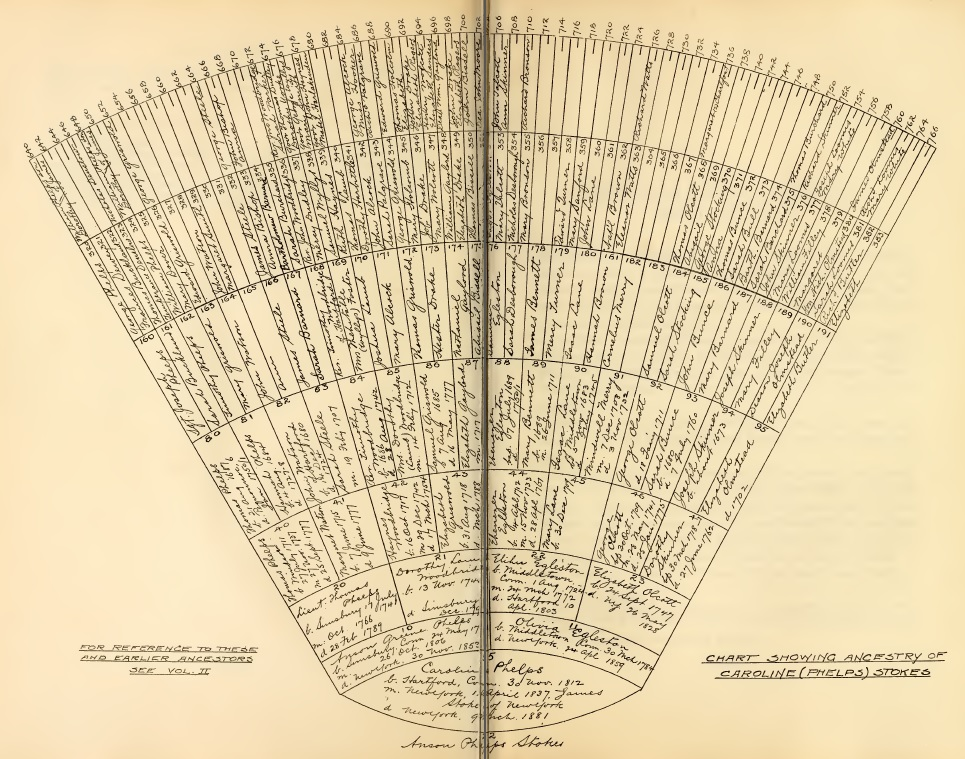
Phelps Egleston family tree published in Stokes Records 1910

Olivia was married to Anson Green Phelps (1781–1853), a businessman who was the co-founder of the Phelps Dodge Company. The other partners in the business were their son, Anson, and sons-in-law, Daniel James, William Dodge and James Stokes. Together, Olivia and Anson were the parents of the following children:

- Elizabeth Woodbridge Phelps (1807–1847), who married Daniel James in New York City on March 24, 1829.
- Melissa Phelps (1809–1903), who married William E. Dodge on June 24, 1828.
- Caroline Olivia Phelps (1811–1812), who died in infancy.
- Caroline Phelps (1812–1881), who married James Boulter Stokes in New York City on April 12, 1837.
- Harriet Phelps (1815–1892), who married Charles Floyer Pond (1809–1867), President of the New Haven, Hartford and Springfield Railroad, on May 24, 1836.
- Anson Green Phelps Jr. (1818–1858), who married Jane Gibson (1818–1908) in 1845. (Note: Jane Gibson, daughter of New York merchant James and his wife Catherine (Van Keuren) Gibson. Jane was involved in many charities and their home at Sleepy Hollow was eventually purchased by their cousin Arthur Curtiss James.)
- Olivia Egleston Phelps (1821–1894), who married Benjamin Bakewell Atterbury (1815–1900) on April 21, 1847. (Note: Benjamin Bakewell Atterbury, was related to Bishop Atterbury and grandson of judge Elisha Boudinot, who was the brother of Elias Boudinot.)
- Lydia Ann Phelps (1823–1831), who died young.

After the death of Olivia's husband on November 30, 1853, the partners in the firm bought his holdings from her for $700,000 (equivalent to $27,090,000 today). Olivia, who was also the sole executrix of his will, continued to live in their home on the East River with her daughter, Olivia, and husband, Benjamin Bakewell Atterbury, plus their children.

Olivia's final years were difficult. Initially there were three executors of her husband's will, Olivia, her son Anson and son-in-law William Earl Dodge. Anson and Dodge withdrew because of conflicts of interest in respect to their business connections to Phelps Dodge & Co. The will was contested on many points by the beneficiaries, including their children and grandchildren, and Olivia sought clarification via the courts. The complexity of the arguments resulted in up to 12 lawyers in court at any one time. In 1858, Olivia's only son, Anson Jr., died of smallpox and within a year, Olivia herself died in New York on April 24, 1859. It was 1861 before the final verdict on Anson Greene Phelps's will was given by the Court of Appeal.

=== Philanthropy ===
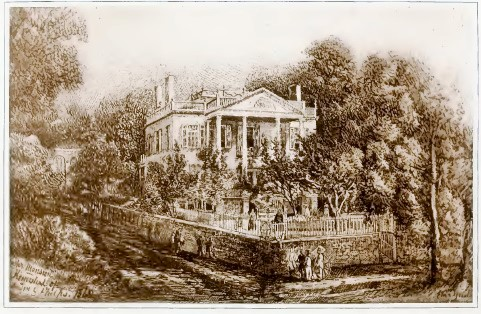
The Anson Greene Phelps house New York on the East river, formally owned by Henry A. Coster, the Dutch merchant.

Olivia shared in her husband's religious devotion and charitable works, supporting many causes including the Society for the Relief of Half Orphans and for 25 years she was a member of the board for the Association for the Relief of Aged and Respectable Indigent Woman. In her home, she entertained missionaries and evangelists including Charles Grandison Finney who, with his family, stayed with the Phelps during his preaching at the Presbyterian church in Vandewater Street, New York (1829-1830).

=== Residence ===
This house had originally been built by Henry A. Coster, the Dutch merchant, in about 1810. He planted the grounds with rare fruit, plants, trees, and it was said to have been one of the finest private gardens in North America. It was bought by Phelps in 1835 who then acquired adjoining properties, so that the land eventually extended from Third Avenue to the East River, and from Twenty-ninth to half-way between Thirty-third and Thirty-fourth streets. The house was of old Colonial architecture, with out-buildings, hothouses, a large conservatory of rare fruits and flowers, gardener's lodge, stabling, summer house and boat house. From the east portico there were views over the lawn, garden, pasture, and river. A cedar of Lebanon that shaded the ice-house was said to have been brought from Mount Lebanon by Henry Coster.

== Family tree ==
Family of Olivia Egleston

			Anson Green Phelps (1781-1853) m. 1806; Olivia Egleston (1784-1859)
Elizabeth Woodbridge Phelps (1807-1847) m. 1829; Daniel James (1801-1876)	Melissa Phelps (1809-1903) m.1828 William Earle Dodge (1805-1883)	Caroline Phelps (1812-1881) m. 1837; James Boulter Stokes (1804–1881)	Harriet Phelps (1815-1892) m.1836 Charles Floyer Pond (1809-1867)	Anson Greene Phelps Jr. (1818-1858) m. 1845; Jane Gibson (1819–1908)	Olivia Egleston Phelps (1821-1894) m. 1847; Benjamin Bakewell Atterbury (1816–1900)	Lydia Ann Phelps (1823-1831)
