= Stephen Van Rensselaer IV =

American landowner, last patroon of Rensselaerswyck

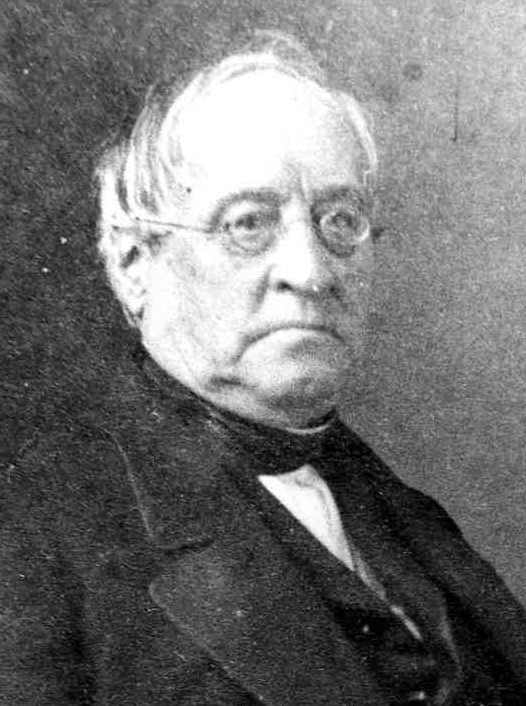

10th Patroon and 7th Lord of the Manor of Rensselaerswyck
- Hereditary lordship 1839–1868
- Preceded by: Stephen Van Rensselaer III
- Succeeded by: Title abolished (de facto)

Personal details
- Born: March 29, 1789 Albany, New York
- Died: May 28, 1868 (aged 79) Albany, New York
- Spouse: Harriet Elizabeth Bayard (m. 1817)
- Relations: See Van Rensselaer family and Schuyler family
- Children: 8
- Parent(s): Stephen Van Rensselaer III; Margarita "Peggy" Schuyler
- Education: Princeton University

Military service
- Allegiance: United States of America
- Branch/service: (New York (state)) New York State Militia
- Rank: Major general

Stephen Van Rensselaer IV (March 29, 1789 – May 28, 1868) was American landowner, known as the "Young Patroon" and sometimes the "last of the patroons". Van Rensselaer was the last Patroon and Lord of the Rensselaerswyck Manor, the last American estate still using the English manorial system.

== Early life ==
Van Rensselaer was born on March 29, 1789, in Albany, New York. He was the son of Stephen Van Rensselaer III (1765–1839), and Margarita "Peggy" Schuyler (1758–1801). His father served as Lieutenant Governor of New York from 1795 to 1801, elected with Governor John Jay.

He was one of three children, and the only to live to adulthood, born to his parents before his mother's premature death in 1801. Shortly thereafter in 1802, his father married Cornelia Paterson, daughter of William Paterson, the 2nd Governor of New Jersey, and later, an Associate Justice of the Supreme Court of the United States. Through his father's second marriage, Van Rensselaer became a half-brother to Cortlandt Van Rensselaer (1808–1860), and Henry Bell Van Rensselaer (1810–1864), a United States representative in the House of Representatives and brigadier general in the Union Army during the American Civil War.

Stephen graduated from Princeton University in 1808.

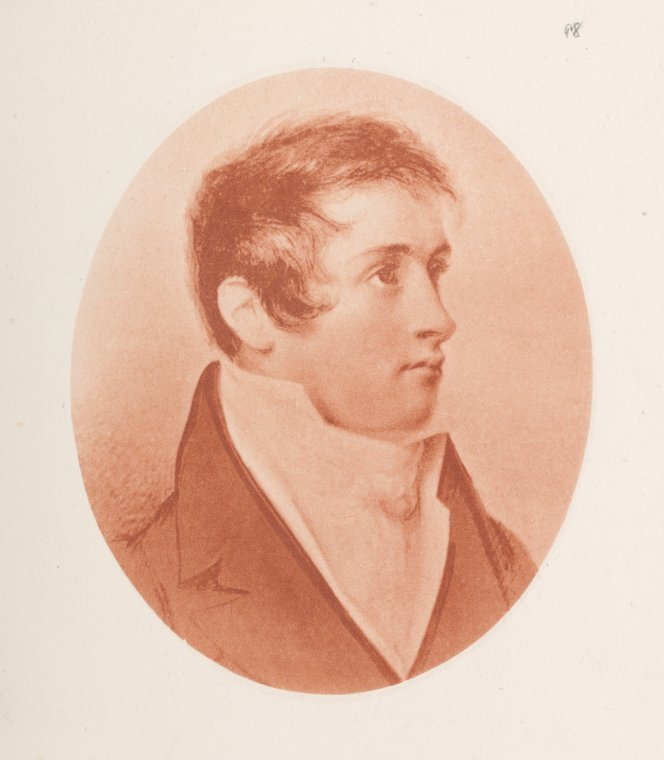
Van Rensselaer young

=== Family ===
His paternal grandfather was Stephen Van Rensselaer II (1742–1769), patroon of Rensselaerswyck, a large land grant in upstate New York awarded by the Dutch to his ancestor Kiliaen van Rensselaer (1586–1643). His paternal grandmother was Catharina Livingston (1745–1810), daughter of Philip Livingston, a signer of the Declaration of Independence. His grandfather died in 1769 when his father was only five. His maternal grandfather was Philip Schuyler (1733–1804), a Revolutionary War general. His maternal grandmother was Catherine Van Rensselaer (1734–1803), the daughter of Johannes van Rensselaer (1707/08–1783) and his first wife, Engeltje "Angelica" Livingston (1698–1746/47). Johannes was the grandson of Hendrick van Rensselaer (1667–1740)

== Career ==
Van Rensselaer served in the New York Militia, and retired with the title of Major General.

=== Rensselaerswyck manor ===
After his father's death in 1839, he inherited the "West Manor" of Rensselaerswyck through his father's will. He made many improvements to the Manor House, which was largely reconstructed and refitted from designs by British architect Richard Upjohn, and moved to the home from his residence in New York City on June 3, 1840. His father's will directed him and his brothers to collect and apply the back rents (approximately US$400,000 (equivalent to $12,100,000 in 2025)) toward the payment of the patroon's debts. Once the rent notices went out, the farmers organized and held public meetings in protest. Van Rensselaer refused to meet with a committee of anti-renters and turned down their written request for a reduction of rents or any other settlement. His refusal infuriated the farmers and on July 4, 1839, a meeting was called at Berne for a declaration of independence from landlord rule. Van Rensselaer and the other heirs secured writs of ejectment in suits against tenants in arrears. There were crowds of angry tenants that turned into a posse of 500 men. Governor William H. Seward was called for military assistance and issued a proclamation calling on the people not to resist the enforcement of the law. While the tenants continued refusing to pay rent, the sheriff evicted some, but was unable to dispossess an entire township.

By 1845, the anti-renters succeeded in getting the New York State Legislature to abolish the right of the landlord to seize the goods of a defaulting tenant and taxed the income which landlords derived from their rent. Soon thereafter, the Constitutional Convention of 1846 prohibited any future lease of agricultural land which claimed rent or service for a period longer than twelve years, but did not address existing leases.

Between 1846 and 1851, the anti-renters elected sheriffs and local officials who paralyzed the efforts of the landlords to collect rents and threw their weight to the candidates of either major party who would support their cause. Rivalries between and within the Whig and Democratic parties enabled the anti-renters to exert more influence than their numbers warranted. As a result, they had a small but determined bloc of anti-rent champions in the Assembly and the Senate who kept landlords uneasy by threatening to pass laws challenging land titles.

The anti-rent endorsement of John Young, the Whig candidate for governor in 1846, proved decisive. Governor Young promptly pardoned several anti-rent prisoners and called for an investigation of titles by the Attorney General. The courts eventually ruled the statute of limitations prevented any questioning of the original titles. Declaring that the holders of perpetual leases were in reality freeholders, the Court of Appeals outlawed the "quarter sales," i.e., the requirement in many leases that a tenant who disposed of his farm should pay one-fourth of the money to the landlord.

As their position became more tenuous, the landed proprietors gradually sold out their interests. In August 1845, seventeen large landholders announced that they were willing to sell. Later that year, Van Rensselaer agreed to sell his rights in the Helderberg townships. In 1848, his brother, William, who had inherited the "East Manor" in Rensselaer County, also sold out his rights in over 500 farms. Finally, in the 1850s, two speculators purchased the remaining leases from the van Rensselaers. After his widow's death, the Manor house became part of the general estate.

== Personal life ==
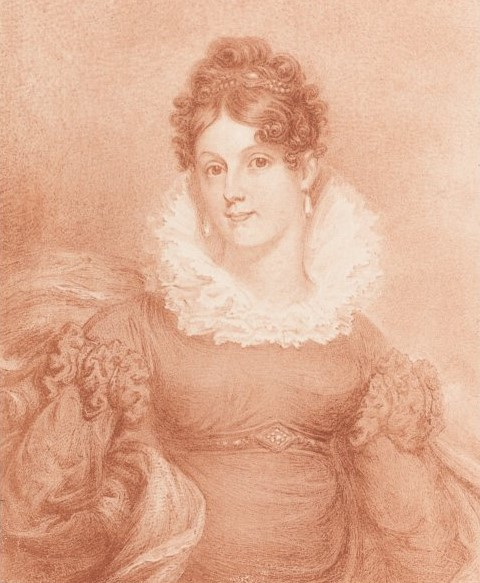
Van Rensselaer's wife, Harriet Elizabeth Bayard

He was married on January 2, 1813, to Harriet Elizabeth Bayard (1799–1875), daughter of William Bayard (1761–1826) of New York City. Together, they had the following children survive to adulthood:

- Margaret Schuyler Van Rensselaer (1819–1897), who married John de Peyster Douw (1812–1901) in 1837. They divorced and in 1851, she married Wilmot Johnson (1820–1899)
- Cornelia Patterson Van Rensselaer (1823–1897), who married Nathaniel Thayer Jr. (1808–1883)
- Stephen Van Rensselaer (1824–1861), who married Annie Louise Wild in 1858.
- Catherine Van Rensselaer (1827–1909), who married Nathaniel Berry (1811–1865)
- Justine Van Rensselaer (1828–1912), who married Dr. Howard Townsend (1823–1867)
- Bayard Van Rensselaer (1833–1859), who married Laura Reynolds (1830–1912), aunt to Marcus T. Reynolds
- Harriet Van Rensselaer (1838–1911), who married John Schuyler Crosby (1839–1914)
- Eugene Van Rensselaer (1840–1925), who married Sarah Boyd Pendleton (1846–1923), a descendant of Elisha Boyd

Stephen Van Rensselaer IV died on May 28, 1868, in Albany, New York. In his will, he left the Van Rensselaer Manor House and grounds, as well as US$15,000 (equivalent to $400,000 in 2025) a year, to his widow. About 2,500 acres between the Troy and Shaker roads, north of the Manor House and in which he had a life estate, reverted to his half-brother, William Paterson Van Rensselaer. The remainder of the estate was divided among his children or the heirs of his children that predeceased him. The property was valued at about US$1,500,000 (equivalent to $36,300,000 in 2025).

=== Descendants ===
His grandson was John Eliot Thayer (1862–1933), an amateur ornithologist. His granddaughter, Cornelia Van Rensselaer Thayer (1849–1903) married J. Hampden Robb (1846–1911), a New York State Senator, in 1868. Their daughter, Van Rensselaer's great-granddaughter, Cornelia Van Rensselaer Thayer (b. 1881) married Danish Count Carl Moltke (1869–1935) in 1907.

Through his grandson, Stephen Van Rensselaer Crosby (1868–1959), he was the great-grandfather of Henry Sturgis Crosby (1898–1929), a bon vivant, poet, and publisher who for some epitomized the Lost Generation in American literature, who was married to Mary Phelps Jacob (1891–1970).
