= Eilardus Westerlo =

Dutch reformed minister (1738–1790)

Eilardus Westerlo (Dutch: [ɛiˈlɑrdʏs ˈʋɛstərloː]; October 30, 1738 in Kantens – December 26, 1790 in Albany) was a Dutch Reformed minister who worked in Colonial New York. He spent his career, from October 1760 until December 1790, as pastor of the Dutch Reformed Church in Albany. During this period, the United States fought for its independence, and the Dutch Reformed Church in North America gained its independence from the mother church in the Netherlands.

== Biography ==
Westerlo was born to Isaac Westerlo (1708–1766), a Dutch-Reformed minister, and Hillegonda Reiners (c. 1715–1750), daughter of Dominee Eilardus Reiners. He was reared in Denekamp, and educated at the grammar school in Oldenzaal and the University of Groningen. Westerlo graduated from the University of Groningen in 1760, and he was ordained as a minister of the Dutch Reformed Church the same year.

In the year of Westerlo's ordination, Drs. Daniel Gerdes and Michaël Bertling in Groningen were asked to find an adequate successor for Theodorus Frelinghuysen as pastor in Albany, New York. Thousands of miles from Albany, unfamiliar with the local situation, faced with a limited number of candidates, these two Groningen professors selected Westerlo. He accepted the call, and arrived in Albany in October 1760.

Westerlo proved not only that he understood the issues in Albany, but also that he could come up with workable solutions. He became one of the leaders of his denomination in America. For thirty years he successfully steered his own congregation past its problems of discord. Moreover, he was instrumental in helping the Dutch Reformed Church in New York and New Jersey establish its own organization in North America. In addition to his work at Albany, he also ministered at Schaghticoke, New York, quarterly.

Although it would take more than a century after the British takeover of New Netherland in 1664 for the English language to replace Dutch in Albany, this process was accelerated by the presence of British troops in and around Albany during the French-and-Indian War (1754–1763). Westerlo's switch from Dutch to English in his Memoirs in 1782 and the addition of English as a language in which he preached laid his conflicting feelings about the use of Dutch bare: he did not want to disappoint the elderly members of his congregation, while at the same time realizing that hanging on to Dutch would lead to the loss of the non-Dutch-speaking part of the population for the Dutch Reformed Church in Albany.

Westerlo also led his large, politically divided congregation, with its powerful consistory and with many influential members, to a solution in the Coetus-Conferentie conflict, and later on the issue of whether the congregation in Albany should join the other North American congregations under the Plan of Union proposed by the Classis of Amsterdam.

When Westerlo's congregation finally joined the Union of Dutch Reformed Churches in 1785, he was immediately chosen to be president of the General Synod. Perhaps for this reason, but also to be celebrated for his efforts towards education, he was made an honorary doctor of theology by the College of New Jersey, now Princeton University, that same year.

Another delicate issue in which Westerlo carefully guided his congregation was its position with regard to the War of Independence. The War put the Dutch Reformed pastors at risk. During the Revolution, he sympathized with the patriots, and delivered the address of welcome when General Washington visited Albany in 1782.

Westerlo died in Albany on December 26, 1790 and was buried at Albany Rural Cemetery.

== Legacy ==
In 1984, Howard Hageman called Eilardus Westerlo "Albany’s Dutch Pope", acknowledging his role as a successful representative of his church community in the quickly changing world of Revolutionary North America.

The town of Westerlo in Albany County is named for him.

Westerlo Street in the city of Albany is also named for him.

== Writings ==
Among his correspondents, Westerlo numbered the Rev. Ezra Stiles, president of Yale, to whom he frequently wrote in Latin and Hebrew. Westerlo left in manuscript an autobiography containing references to the years between 1761 and 1790, Greek and Hebrew lexicons, complete, and a translation from the Dutch of Robert Alberthoma's “Catechism” (1790; 2d ed., 1805).

== Family ==
In 1775, Westerlo married Catharine Livingston, daughter of Philip Livingston ("the Signer") and widow of Stephen Van Rensselaer II. Their son, Rensselaer Westerlo, was elected to the United States Congress.

His stepsons Stephen Van Rensselaer III (1764-1839) and Philip Schuyler Van Rensselaer (1767-1824) were also active in business and government: Stephen was a Congressman and served as Lieutenant Governor of New York from 1795 to 1801, and founded Rensselaer Polytechnic Institute in 1824. Philip was Mayor of Albany from 1799 to 1816 and 1819 to 1820.
