= Anti-Rent War =

Popular revolt in Upstate New York (1839–1845)

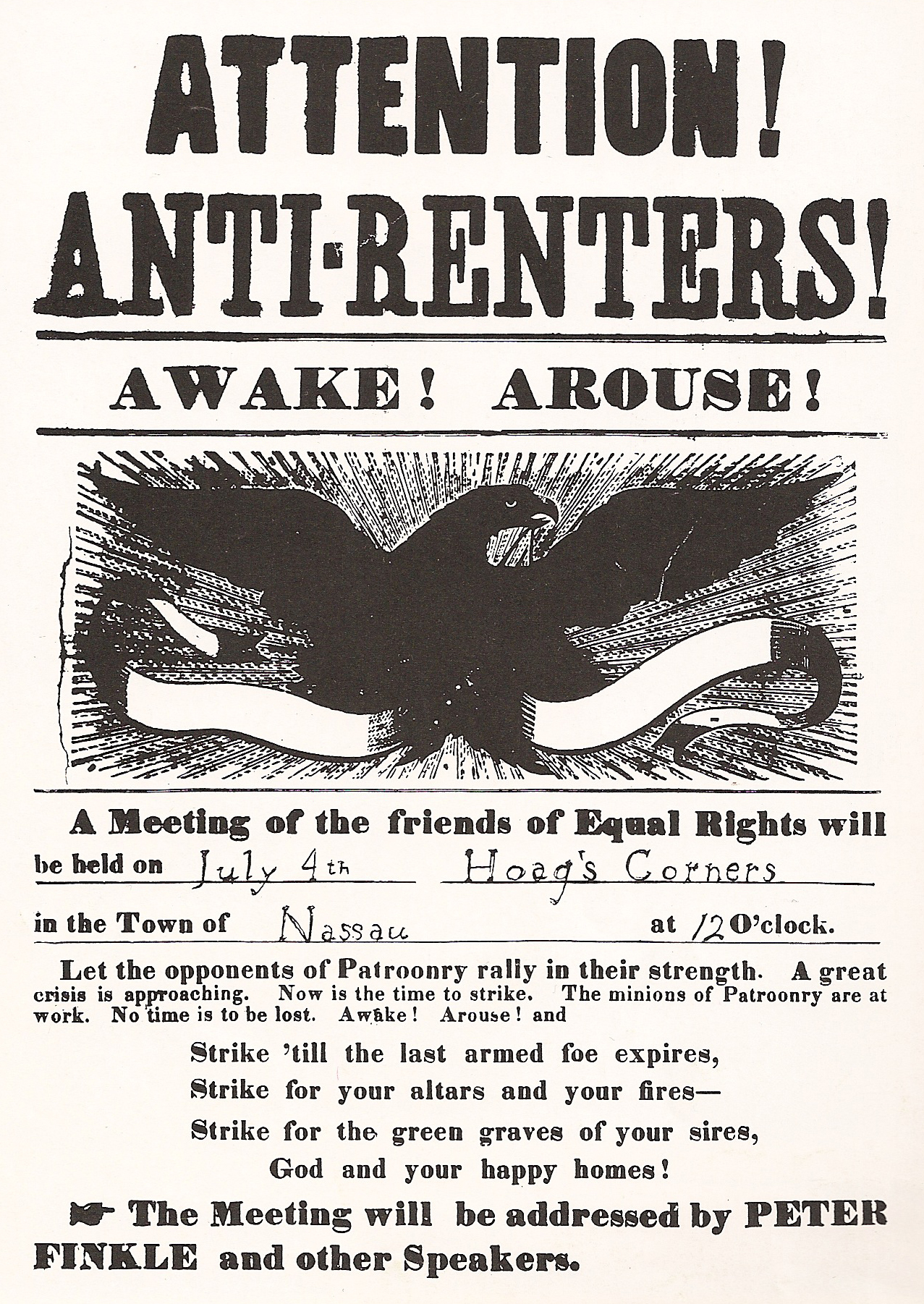
- Poster announcing an Anti-Rent meeting in the town of Nassau, New York
Date	1839–1845
Location	Hudson Valley, Upstate New York
Result	Abolition of feudal tenure

Belligerents
Tenants	Patroons; State of New York

Commanders and leaders
Smith A. Boughton	Stephen Van Rensselaer; William L. Marcy; John Van Buren; Gov. William H. Seward

Units involved
25,000–60,000 tenants	ㅤ

The Anti-Rent War (also known as the Helderberg War) was a tenants' revolt in upstate New York between 1839 and 1845. The Anti-Renters declared their independence from the manor system run by patroons, resisting tax collectors and successfully demanding land reform. The conflict resulted in the passage of laws that made feudal tenures illegal and outlawed leases greater than 12 years.

== Events ==
The incident began with the death of Stephen Van Rensselaer III in 1839. Van Rensselaer, who was described as a "lenient and benevolent landowner" was a patroon; as a way to develop his vast landholdings, which covered 850,000 acres that spanned parts of Rensselaer, Albany, Greene, and Columbia counties, Van Rensselaer granted tenants lifetime leases at moderate prices.

During his life, when tenants were in financial constraints, he preferred to accept rent in the form of goods and services in lieu of cash, allow rents to accumulate, or accept partial payment rather than evict them. However, his leases also included a "quarter-sale" provision, which required tenants who sold their leases to pay Van Rensselaer one fourth of the sale price or one additional year's rent. The patroons owned much of the land on which the tenants in the Hudson Valley lived, and used this feudal lease system to maintain control of the region.

When he died, his wealth had been reduced in the economic downturn known as the Panic of 1837, so Van Rensselaer's will directed his heirs to collect outstanding rents and quarter-sale payments to apply to his estate's debts. When the heirs attempted to collect, tenants who believed their debts would be forgiven at Van Rensselaer's death could not pay the amounts demanded, could not secure a favorable payment schedule from the heirs, and could not obtain relief in the courts, so they revolted.

The first mass meeting of tenant farmers leading to the Anti-Rent War was held at the top of the Helderberg mountains in Berne, New York, on July 4, 1839. They issued a declaration of independence, promising: "We will take up the ball of the Revolution where our fathers stopped it and roll it to the final consummation of freedom and independence of the masses." Among their tactics was the rent strike, with tenants refusing to pay on their leases unless Van Rensselaer's heirs and the other patroons agreed to a negotiated settlement.

In December 1839, the Anti-Renters repulsed a 500-man posse led by Albany County sheriff Michael Artcher and including William Marcy and John Van Buren. Governor William Seward threatened the rebels with 700 militiamen and obtained their surrender. However, an insurrection continued to smoulder. By May 1844, renters had formed a secret order modelled on the Chartists whose members wore "Calico Indian" disguises, a reference to the Boston Tea Party. They resisted eviction, tax and rent collection, and law enforcement, sometimes tarring and feathering their enemies.

The conflict gained the support of somewhere between 25,000 and 60,000 of the approximately 300,000 tenants in the patroon system. In January 1845, one hundred and fifty delegates from eleven counties assembled at St. Paul's Lutheran Church in Berne to call for political action to redress their grievances.

== Results ==
The Anti-Rent War led to the creation of the Antirenter Party, which had a strong influence on New York State politics from 1846 to 1851. Newly elected governor Silas Wright moved in 1845 to stamp out the Calico Indians, and pushed for a law which outlawed disguises.

Trials of leaders of the revolt, charged with riot, conspiracy and robbery, were held in 1845 with Amasa J. Parker presiding. Attorneys included Ambrose L. Jordan, as leading counsel for the defense, and John Van Buren, the state attorney general, who personally conducted the prosecution. At the first trial, the jury came to no conclusion and Parker declared a mistrial. During a re-trial in September 1845, the two attorneys started a fistfight in open court. Both were sentenced by the presiding judge, John W. Edmonds, to "solitary confinement in the county jail for 24 hours." At the conclusion of the trial, one defendant, Smith A. Boughton, was sentenced to life imprisonment. After the election of John Young as governor in 1846 with the support of the Anti-Renters, he pardoned Boughton.

John Van Steenburgh and Edward O'Connor were sentenced to death by hanging for their involvement in the shooting death of Undersheriff Osman Steele, an incident that took place on August 7, 1845, at Moses Earle's farm in Andes, New York, during a sheriff's sale that was held after Earle was unable to pay his back rent. The day following the murder, a panel of judges met every day for a month, except on Sundays. A state of insurrection in the county was declared by the governor, and 248 people were detained in a makeshift jail. Earle and two others were sentenced to life in prison. Several others received lesser prison sentences. Governor Young later commuted the death sentences to life in prison. At least seven men including Earle were sent to Dannemora just as the prison opened in 1845.

The New York Constitution of 1846 added provisions for tenants' rights, abolishing feudal tenures and outlawing leases lasting longer than twelve years. The remaining manors dissolved quickly as the patroons sold off the lands.

== People involved ==
- Smith A. Boughton, Anti-Rent leader
- Thomas Ainge Devyr, an Irish-American Chartist, printer, philosopher, and organiser.
- John W. Edmonds, judge who presided at Anti-Rent leader trials
- Ambrose L. Jordan, defense counsel at trials of Anti-Rent leaders.
- William Marcy, participated in posse to end Anti-Renter insurrection.
- Edward O'Connor, Anti-Renter who was convicted for murdering Undersheriff Osman Steele. He was sentenced to death, which was later commuted to life in prison.
- Amasa J. Parker, judge who presided at trials of Anti-Rent leaders,
- William Seward, governor at start of Anti-Rent rebellion who took steps to end it.
- John I. Slingerland, state legislator and U.S. Congressman, was an advocate for the tenants during the Anti-Rent War.
- John Van Buren, took part in posse that attempted to end Anti-Renter insurrection, prosecutor at trials of Anti-Renter leaders.
- Lawrence Van Deusen, president of the Anti-Rent Association of Albany County, New York.
- Stephen Van Rensselaer IV, heir to the Manor of Rensselaerswyck. His efforts to collect past due rents and refusal to negotiate with Anti-Renters was the primary cause of the dispute.
- John Van Steenburgh, Anti-Renter who was convicted for murdering Undersheriff Osman Steele. He was sentenced to death, which was later commuted to life in prison.
- Silas Wright, A Democrat who was governor prior to John Young, his efforts to end the Anti-Rent rebellion led to the election of Young, who was the nominee of the Whig Party.
- John Young, governor following the trials of the Anti-Rent leaders, he granted a pardon to Smith Boughton and commutations to other participants.

== See also ==
- Anya Seton's novel Dragonwyck (1944), set during the Anti-Rent War
- 1918–1920 New York City rent strikes
- 1907 New York City Rent Strike
- List of incidents of civil unrest in the United States
- Manor of Rensselaerswyck, for further information on how the following years convinced landed proprietors to sell out their interests
- Gove's Rebellion, a 17th century protest against the imposition of a landed proprietor
