= Cortlandt Van Rensselaer =

American clergyman (1808–1860)

Rev. Cortlandt Van Rensselaer
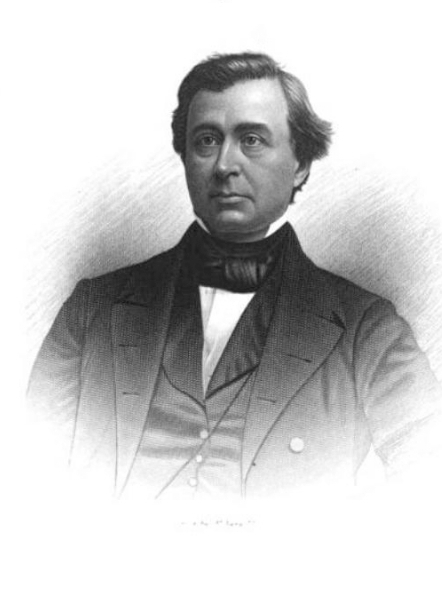
- Born: May 26, 1808; Albany, New York, US
- Died: July 25, 1860 (aged 52); Burlington, New Jersey, US
- Education: Yale University; Union Theological Seminary; Princeton Theological Seminary
- Spouse: Catherine Ledyard
- Children: 6, including Alexander
- Parent(s): Stephen Van Rensselaer III; Cornelia Paterson
- Relatives: See Van Rensselaer family

Signature
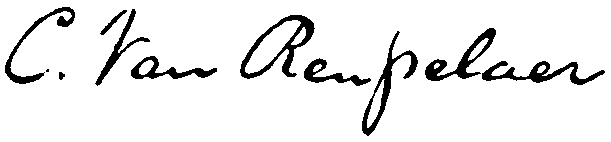

Cortlandt Van Rensselaer (May 26, 1808 – July 25, 1860) was a Presbyterian clergyman from the United States.

== Early life ==
Cortlandt Van Rensselaer was born in Albany, New York, a son of General Stephen Van Rensselaer and Cornelia Bell Paterson, his father's second wife. He graduated from Yale in 1827, and then studied at Union Theological Seminary, Prince Edward County, Virginia, (now Union Presbyterian Seminary) and at Princeton Theological Seminary.

== Career ==
He was a missionary to the slaves in Virginia 1833–1835. He was ordained in 1835, and became pastor of the Presbyterian church in Burlington, New Jersey, in 1837, of the 2nd Presbyterian Church, Washington, D.C., in 1841, and agent of Princeton Theological Seminary in 1844, raising $100,000 for its endowment. He was secretary of the Presbyterian board of education 1846–1860, and founded and edited the Presbyterian Magazine and The Home, the School, and the Church.

The New York University gave him the degree of D.D. in 1845. Much of his large fortune was devoted to benevolent objects and to the religious enterprises of the Presbyterian church. After his death, selections from his published writings appeared under the title of Miscellaneous Sermons, Essays, and Addresses, edited by his son, Cortlandt Van Rensselaer (Philadelphia, 1861).

== Personal life ==
He was married to Catherine Ledyard (1811–1882), sister of Henry Ledyard. They were children of New York lawyer Benjamin Ledyard and Susan French (née Livingston) Ledyard (herself the daughter of Supreme Court Justice Henry Brockholst Livingston and granddaughter of New Jersey governor William Livingston).). Together Cortlandt and Catherine had:

- Cortlandt Van Rensselaer (1838–1864), a captain in the U.S. Army, who died in Nashville, Tennessee with the 13th United States Infantry, aged 27.
- Philip Ledyard Van Rensselaer (1839–1873), who died at Vevey, Switzerland, aged 34.
- Ledyard Van Rensselaer (1843–1892), who died unmarried
- Alice Cogswell Van Rensselaer (1846–1878), who married Edward Blanchard Hodge (1841–1906) in 1868.
- Elizabeth Wadsworth Van Rensselaer (1848–1886)
- Alexander Van Rensselaer (1850–1933), who married Sarah Rozet Drexel Fell (1860–1929), daughter of Anthony Joseph Drexel (1826–1893)

Van Rensselaer died on July 25, 1860, in Burlington, New Jersey.
