= Stephen Van Rensselaer =

American landowner, businessman, politician, and militia officer (1764–1839)

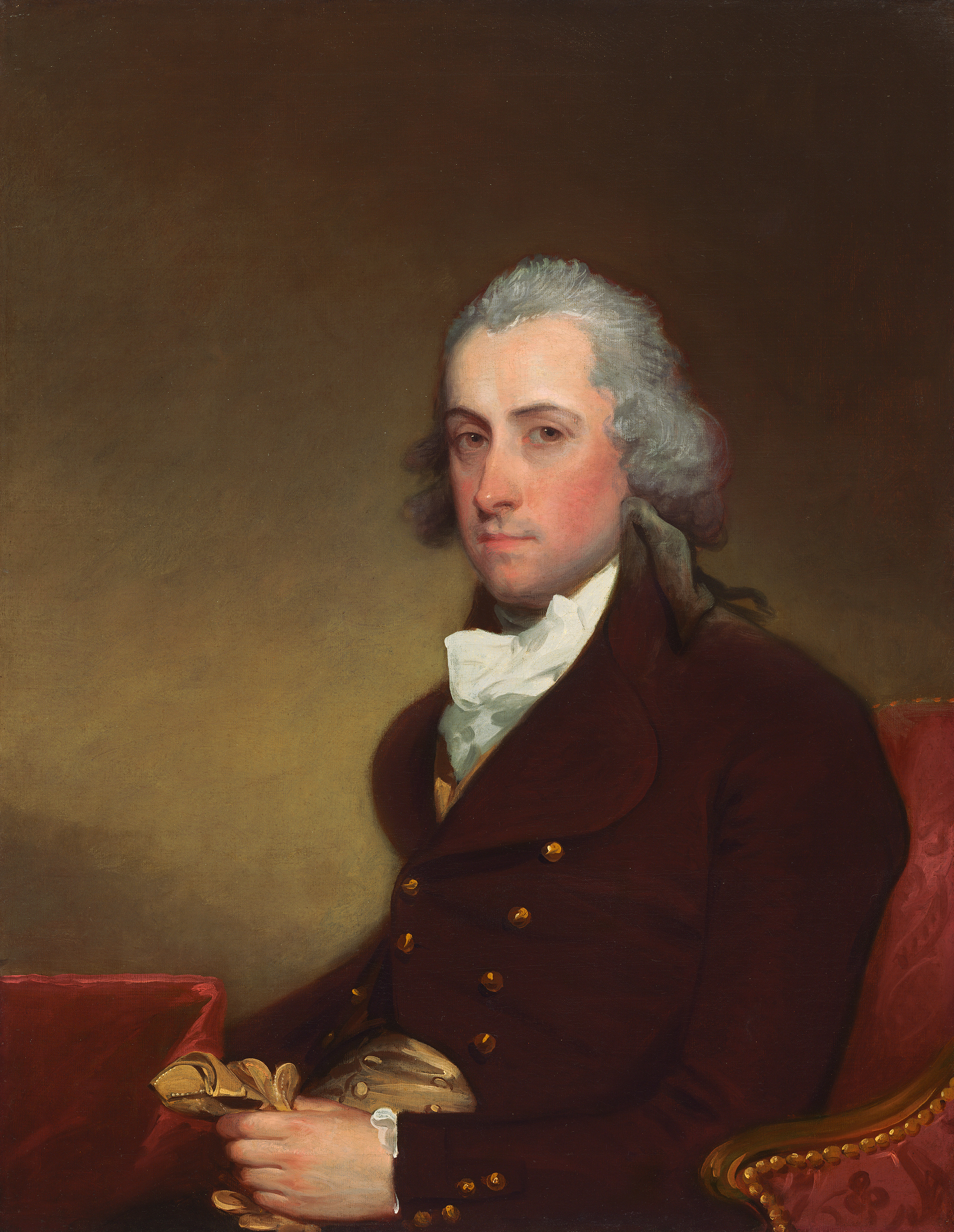
- Portrait by Gilbert Stuart, c. 1793–1795

Member of the U.S. House of Representatives from New York
- In office March 12, 1822 – March 3, 1829
- Preceded by: Solomon Van Rensselaer
- Succeeded by: Ambrose Spencer
- Constituency: 9th district (1822–1823); 10th district (1823–1829)

Lieutenant Governor of New York
- In office July 1, 1795 – June 30, 1801
- Governor: John Jay
- Preceded by: Pierre Van Cortlandt
- Succeeded by: Jeremiah Van Rensselaer

Member of the New York State Senate from the Western district at-large
- In office 1791–1796

Member of the New York State Assembly from the Albany County district at-large
- In office 1789–1791

Grand Master of the Masonic Grand Lodge of New York
- In office 1825–1829
- Preceded by: Joseph Enos
- Succeeded by: Morgan Lewis

9th Patroon and 6th Lord of the Manor of Rensselaerswyck
- Hereditary lordship 1769–1839
- Preceded by: Stephen Van Rensselaer II
- Succeeded by: Stephen Van Rensselaer IV

Personal details
- Born: November 1, 1764 New York City, Province of New York, British America
- Died: January 26, 1839 (aged 74) New York City, U.S.
- Resting place: Albany Rural Cemetery, Menands, New York
- Party: Federalist; Adams Republican
- Spouses: Margarita "Peggy" Schuyler (m. 1783; died 1801) Cornelia Paterson (m. 1802)
- Children: 12, including Stephen, Cortlandt and Henry
- Relatives: See Van Rensselaer family
- Education: Harvard College
- Profession: Landowner; Businessman
- Net worth: USD $10 million at the time of his death (equivalent to between $282 million and $349 million in 2023.)
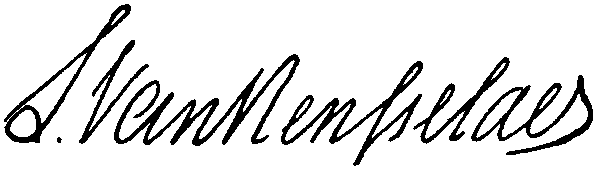
- Signature

Stephen Van Rensselaer III (/ˈrɛnslər, -slɪər/; November 1, 1764 – January 26, 1839), was an American landowner, businessman, politician, and militia officer. He took control of Rensselaerswyck, his family's manor in upstate New York, at the age of twenty-one. He encouraged settlement by granting tenants seven years of free rent, although he retained ownership of timber, minerals, and water power. He earned the sobriquet "the Good Patroon" for generally proving to be a lenient landlord; rather than eviction, he preferred to accept partial payment or goods and services in lieu of cash when tenants were in arrears.

A Federalist and brother-in-law of Alexander Hamilton, Van Rensselaer served in both houses of the state legislature and as lieutenant governor. After the demise of the Federalist Party, Van Rensselaer was a John Quincy Adams supporter and served in the United States House of Representatives for one partial term and three full ones. Van Rensselaer was a supporter of higher education; he served on the board of trustees for several schools and colleges and was the founder of the Rensselaer Polytechnic Institute. He was also a civic activist and philanthropist and was a founder of Albany's public library and the city's Institute of History & Arts.

Long active in the militia, Van Rensselaer attained the rank of major general; he commanded troops on the New York–Canada border during the War of 1812, but resigned his commission after defeat at the Battle of Queenston Heights. After Van Rensselaer's 1839 death, efforts by his sons to collect past due lease payments led to the Anti-Rent War, and the break up and sale of the manor. As the heir to and then owner of one of the largest estates in New York, Van Rensselaer's holdings made him the tenth richest American of all time, based on the ratio of his fortune to contemporary GDP.

== Early life ==
Van Rensselaer was born in New York City, the eldest child of Stephen van Rensselaer II, the ninth patroon of Rensselaerswyck, a large land grant in Upstate New York awarded to his ancestor Kiliaen Van Rensselaer by the Dutch Republic when the region was part of the colony of New Netherland. His mother was Catharina Livingston, daughter of Philip Livingston, a signer of the Declaration of Independence. His family was very wealthy, and the Van Rensselaer Manor House was a rich childhood environment for the young boy to grow up in. However, his father died in 1769 when Van Rensselaer was only five. He grew up with the men on his maternal side and became very interested in the sciences such as mathematics, biology and chemistry.

Van Rensselaer was raised by his mother and stepfather, the Reverend Eilardus Westerlo, whom his mother married in 1775, and his Livingston grandfather. His uncle, Abraham Ten Broeck, administered the Van Rensselaer estate after the untimely death of Van Rensselaer's father. From an early age, Van Rensselaer was raised to succeed his father as lord of the manor. Stephen's younger brother Philip S. Van Rensselaer (1767–1824), later served as Mayor of Albany from 1799 to 1816, and again from 1819 to 1820.

Van Rensselaer began attending the College of New Jersey (later Princeton); since it was near to battles of the ongoing American Revolution, he was later sent to Harvard College, from which he graduated Phi Beta Kappa with an A.B. degree in 1782.

== Early career ==
On his 21st birthday, Van Rensselaer took possession of Rensselaerswyck, his family's 1,200 square mile (3,072 km^{2}) estate, and began a long tenure as lord of the manor. Van Rensselaer desired to profit from the land, but was extremely reluctant to sell it off. Instead, he developed the land by granting perpetual leases at moderate rates; Van Rensselaer derived a steady rental income from his property while retaining timber, water, and mineral rights, while tenants were able to become successful farmers without having to pay a large purchase price up front. This meant that they could invest more in their operations, which led to increased productivity in the area. Over time, Van Rensselaer became landlord to more than 80,000 tenants. He generally proved to be a lenient landlord; he accepted produce such as grain and firewood in place of cash for rent payments, and when tenants found themselves in financial difficulty, he usually preferred to accept late or partial payments rather than evict them. One facet of the leases Van Rensselaer granted was the "quarter-sale"—tenants who sold their leases were required to pay Van Rensselaer one fourth of the sale price or one additional year's rent. Over time, this requirement became a point of contention between Van Rensselaer and the tenants, which in part led to the Anti-Rent War.

In the 1790 United States census, it was recorded that he owned fifteen slaves. By the time of the 1830 census, he had none, in keeping with New York's gradual emancipation law, under which all enslaved people in the state were freed by 1827. Van Rensselaer later became an advocate of enabling African Americans to emigrate to colonies in Africa, such as Liberia, and he served as a vice president of the Albany Auxiliary Society and the American Colonization Society.

In 1791, Van Rensselaer was one of the incorporators of the Albany Library, which evolved over time into the Albany Public Library, and he was chosen to serve on the board of trustees. In 1797, Van Rensselaer was an organizer of the Albany and Schenectady Turnpike Company, and served on its board of directors.

== Political career ==
A Federalist, Van Rensselaer was a member of the New York State Assembly from 1789 to 1791, and the New York State Senate from 1791 to 1796.

He was Lieutenant Governor of New York from 1795 to 1801, elected with Governor John Jay. Van Rensselaer, over his time in politics, acquired a reputation as something of a reformer, voting in favor of extending suffrage and going against much of New York's upper class in doing so. In 1801, Van Rensselaer presided over the state constitutional convention, was the Federalist nominee for Governor of New York, and lost to George Clinton, 24,808 votes to 20,843.

He was one of the first to advocate for a canal from the Hudson River to the Great Lakes and was appointed to a commission to investigate the route in 1810, reporting favorably to the Assembly in 1811. Van Rensselaer served on the Erie Canal Commission for 23 years (1816–1839), fourteen of which he served as its president. In 1821, he was a member of the New York State Constitutional Convention.

In 1822, he won the special election for the seat in the House of Representatives from which his cousin Solomon had resigned. He served from February 27, 1822, to March 3, 1829, during the Seventeenth, Eighteenth, Nineteenth, and Twentieth Congresses; during the last three sessions, he was the chairman of the Committee on Agriculture.

=== Role in deciding 1824 presidential election ===
In 1825 Van Rensselaer cast the vote that likely decided the presidential election in favor of John Quincy Adams. Because none of the four candidates received a majority of electoral votes in the 1824 presidential election, the U.S. House had to choose from the top three finishers—Adams, Andrew Jackson, and William H. Crawford. House members voted first individually by state, and then each state cast one ballot for the candidate who received a majority of the state's House delegation; a candidate had to carry 13 state delegations to win the election. Van Rensselaer had intended to vote for Crawford, but changed his mind and voted for Adams. His vote gave Adams a majority of the New York delegation; winning New York gave Adams 13 states in the House vote, to seven for Jackson and four for Crawford.

== Military career ==
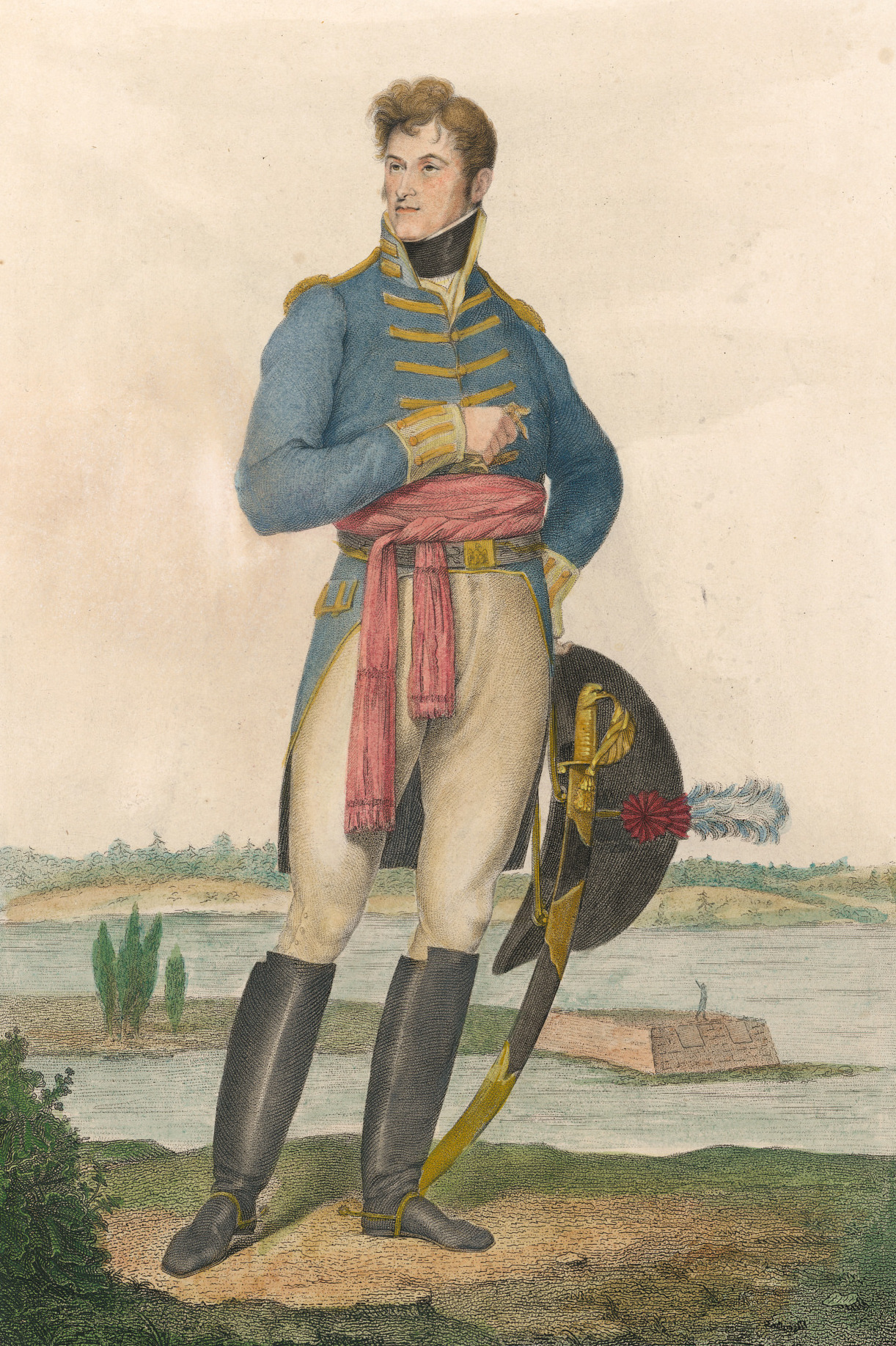
c. 1813 engraving of Van Rensselaer as a major general

In 1786, Van Rensselaer was appointed a major in the Albany County Regiment of the New York militia. He became commander of the regiment two years later as a lieutenant colonel, and was subsequently promoted to colonel. In 1801 he was promoted to major general as commander of the state militia's cavalry division.

=== War of 1812 ===
Van Rensselaer's militia experience led to an appointment to command troops during the War of 1812. When war was declared on Great Britain in June 1812, Van Rensselaer was a leading Federalist candidate for Governor of New York. Democratic-Republican Party leaders, including President James Madison and incumbent New York Governor Daniel D. Tompkins, devised a way to remove Van Rensselaer from the campaign by offering him command of the Army of the Centre—U.S. militia and regular Army troops massing in upstate New York for an invasion of Canada. If Van Rensselaer declined a military leadership role during a time of war, he would lose esteem in the eyes of the voters. If he accepted, he would likely be unable to run for governor.

Van Rensselaer accepted; despite having held high rank in the militia, he was largely inexperienced at leading large bodies of troops. As a condition of his acceptance, his cousin Solomon, who had more military experience, was appointed his aide-de-camp. But the Army of the Centre consisted largely of untrained, inexperienced militiamen; under the Constitution, which stressed that the role of the militia was to enforce laws, prevent insurrection, and repel invasion, they did not have to cross into Canada to fight.

The British were in the process of fortifying the Queenston Heights that Van Rensselaer would have to attack, and his officers were itching for action despite their general's desire to delay until his troops were better trained and organized. To make matters worse, Brigadier General Alexander Smyth, Van Rensselaer's subordinate, had a large force of regular Army troops that was theoretically under Van Rensselaer's command, but Smyth refused to subordinate himself to a militia officer. With some of his officers planning to try and force him from command, Van Rensselaer decided to act without Smyth.

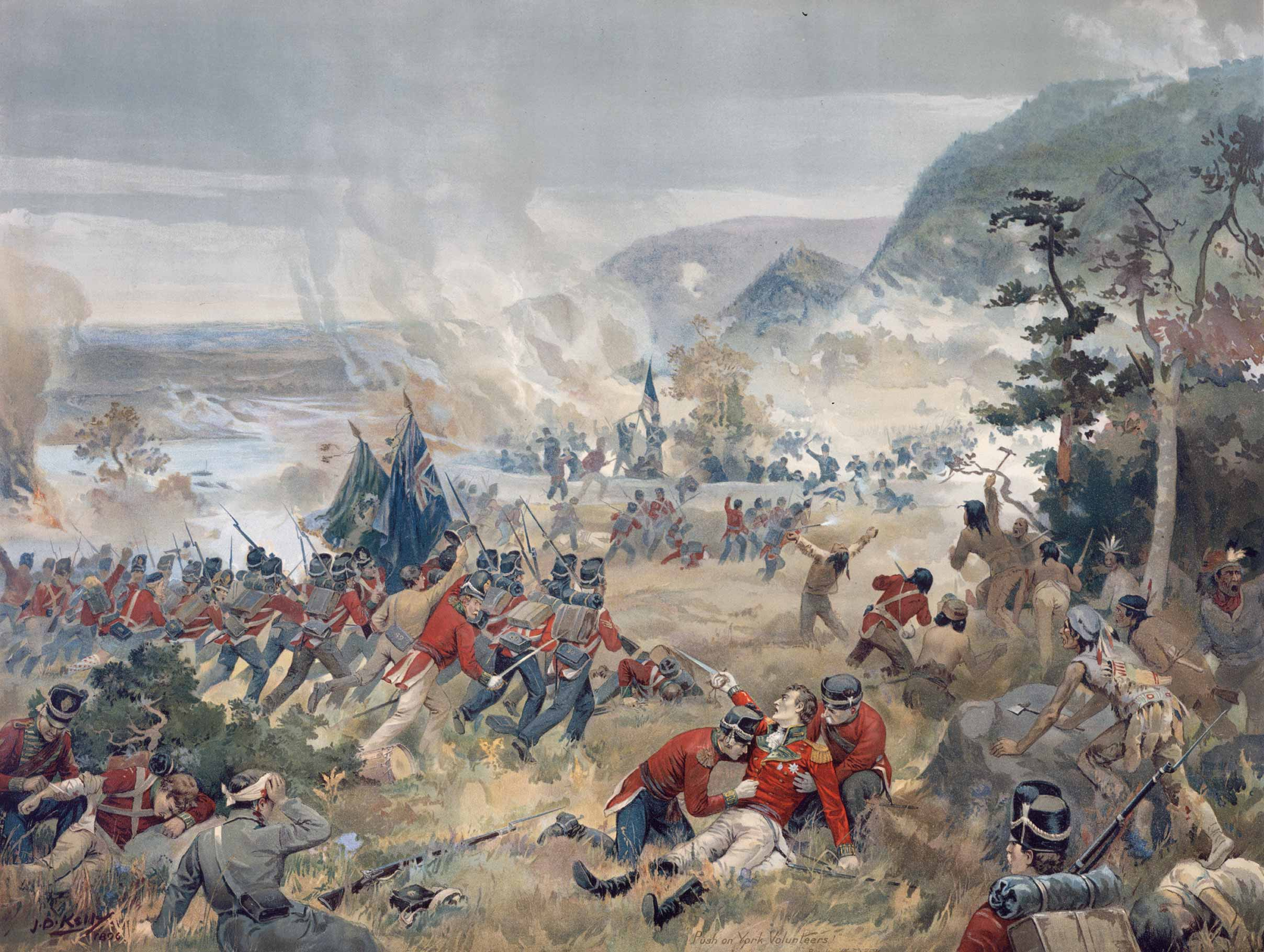
The Battle of Queenston Heights, which ended Van Rensselaer's active military career

On October 13, 1812, Van Rensselaer launched an attack on the British position that would evolve into the Battle of Queenston Heights. Though initially successful, Van Rensselaer's inadequate preparations and his plan of attack were clearly main reasons for what became a major defeat. He was unable to secure the element of surprise, he did not procure enough boats for his men to cross the Niagara River easily, and he was even unable to supply his soldiers with sufficient ammunition. Despite significantly outnumbering the British in the early stages of the battle, the American soldiers, untried and untrained, sometimes refused to cross to the Canadian side of the river. Once the tide of the battle turned, Van Rensselaer was not even able to coax the boatmen into going back over to rescue the doomed attack force. His forces were badly beaten by British troops under generals Isaac Brock and, after Brock's death, Roger Hale Sheaffe.

The defeat at Queenston Heights spelled the end to Van Rensselaer's active military career; after the battle, he resigned his post. He continued to serve in the militia and was the senior major general in the state at the time of his death. Despite his military setback, Van Rensselaer was still the Federalist candidate for governor in April 1813; he lost to Tompkins 43,324 votes to 39,713.

== Later career ==
Portrait by John Wesley Jarvis, c. 1825–1835

After the war, Van Rensselaer continued his service on the Erie Canal Commission, and between 1820 and 1823 commissioned an agricultural and geological survey of the canal's surroundings, at his own expense. He also held many significant posts after the war. In 1820, he was elected president of the state Board of Agriculture. Also in 1820, he was an incorporator of the Albany Savings Bank, and was elected to serve as the bank's president.

In 1824, Van Rensselaer was one of the organizers of the Albany Institute, and was elected its president. This organization later merged with another to form the Albany Institute of History & Art. He was also active in the American Lyceum organization, and served as its president.

When the New York Life Insurance and Trust Company received its corporate charter from the State of New York in 1830, Van Rensselaer was an original incorporator, and he went on to serve as a member of the company's board of directors. New York Life Insurance and Trust operated until 1922, when it merged with the Bank of New York to become the Bank of New York & Trust Company.

Following the 1834 death in France of the Marquis de Lafayette, Van Rensselaer was appointed marshal for the Albany-area commemorations. He led the parade of militia members, fire fighters, Revolutionary War veterans and others, which culminated in speeches and a eulogy by William Buell Sprague.

=== Higher education advocate ===
Van Rensselaer was elected one of the members of the Williams College Corporation in 1794.

In 1812, Van Rensselaer took part in the incorporation of Albany's Lancaster School, an institution dedicated to providing an education for children whose parents could not afford to send them to school, and he served on the school's board of trustees. In 1813, Van Rensselaer was one of the organizers of The Albany Academy, and was chosen to serve as the first president of the school's board of trustees.

Van Rensselaer was a member of the University of the State of New York Board of Regents from 1819 to 1839, and from 1835 to 1839 he was the board's chancellor.

In 1824 Van Rensselaer and Amos Eaton established the Rensselaer School (now known as Rensselaer Polytechnic Institute, or RPI) "for the purpose of instructing persons, who may choose to apply themselves, in the application of science to the common purposes of life". Since its founding, RPI has developed a reputation for academic excellence, particularly in the field of engineering.

From 1829 to 1839, Van Rensselaer served as a member of the Rutgers College board of trustees.

=== Religious activities ===
Van Rensselaer was long active in the Dutch Reformed Church; he served several terms as a deacon and elder of the First Reformed Church in Albany, and attended numerous synod meetings and similar gatherings as a delegate. He was active in the American Home Missionary Society, and served as the organization's president in the 1820s. In 1834, he donated a lot at the corner of Green and South Ferry Streets in Albany for construction of the Third Reformed Church. For many years, Van Rensselaer was a member of the Albany Bible Society, and he served on its board of managers. He was also active on the American Board of Commissioners for Foreign Missions, and served as vice president.

=== Masonic Grand Master ===
Van Rensselaer was an active Mason beginning early in his adulthood; from 1825 to 1829 he served as the Grand Master of the Grand Lodge of New York. His leadership of the statewide organization coincided with the rise of the Anti-Masonic Party in Western New York, and Van Rensselaer forged an alliance with the Democrats of the Albany Regency led by Martin Van Buren and Enos T. Throop as a way to blunt the political influence of the Anti-Masons.

== Personal life ==
Several members of Van Rensselaer's extended family served in Congress including Jeremiah Van Rensselaer (1741–1810), Killian K. Van Rensselaer (1763–1845), and Solomon Van Rensselaer (1774–1852).

In June 1783, Van Rensselaer married Margarita "Peggy" Schuyler (1758–1801), a distant cousin and the daughter of Revolutionary War general Philip Schuyler, and sister-in-law of Alexander Hamilton. Their marriage resulted in three children, all of whom were baptized at the First Dutch Reformed Church in Albany. Only one of their children survived to adulthood:

- Catherine Schuyler Van Rensselaer (1784–1797), who died young
- Stephen Van Rensselaer (1786–1787), who died young
- Stephen Van Rensselaer IV (1789–1868), inherited the east side of Rensselaerwyck and inherited the manor in 1839 by his father's will. He graduated from Princeton in 1808. He served as major general of militia. During the anti-rent troubles in 1839 he sold his townships, and at his death the manor passed out of the hands of his descendants.

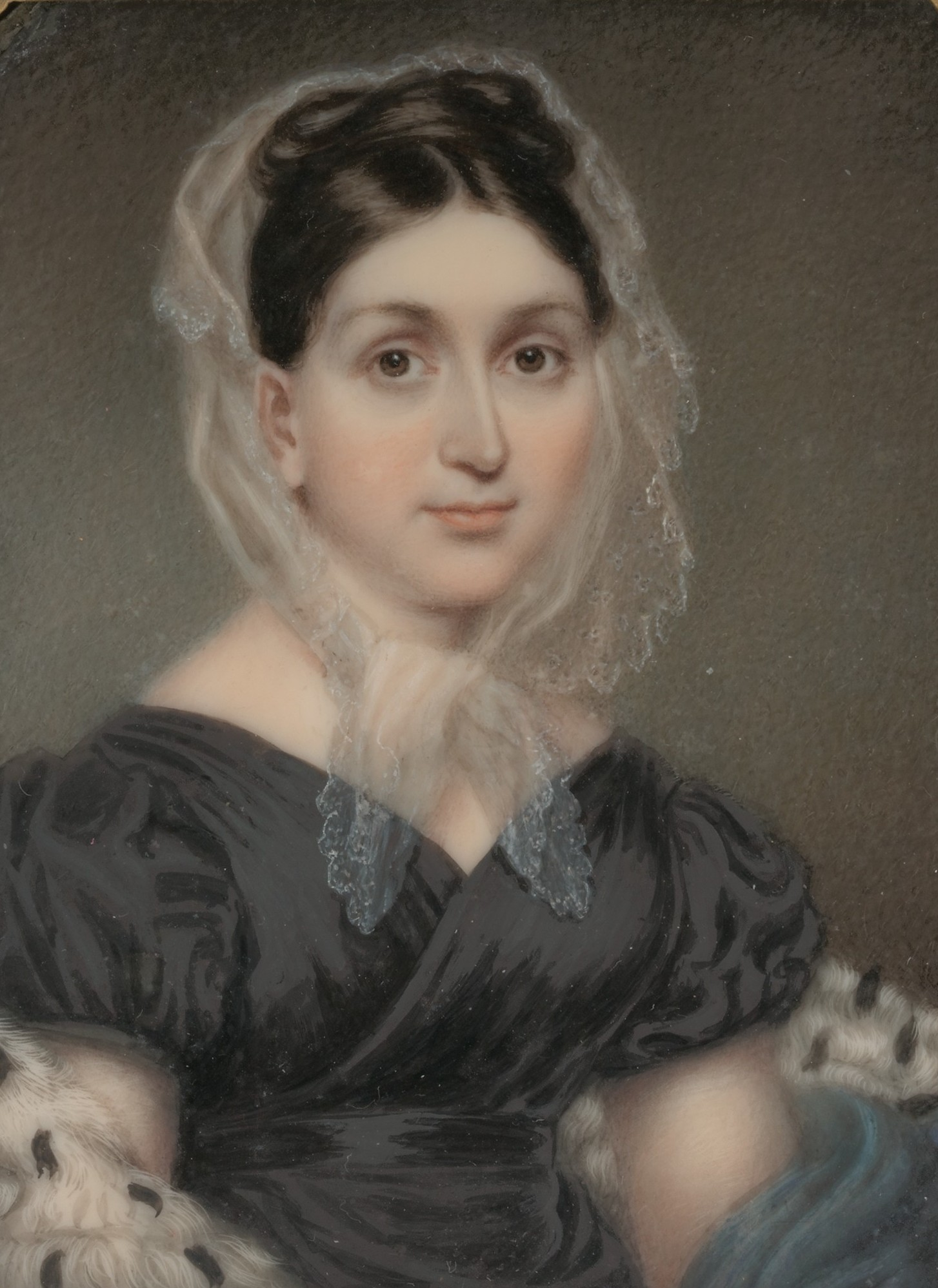
His second wife, Cornelia Paterson

After Schuyler's death in 1801, in 1802 Van Rensselaer married Cornelia Bell Paterson, the daughter of William Paterson. Together, they had:

- Catherine Van Rensselaer (1803–1874), who married Gouverneur Morris Wilkins (d. 1871)
- William Paterson Van Rensselaer (1805–1872), who married Eliza Bayard Rogers (1811–1835), and after her death, her sister, Sarah Rogers (1810–1887), both were granddaughters of William Bayard Jr.
- Philip Stephen Van Rensselaer (1806–1871), who married Mary Rebecca Tallmadge (1817–1872), daughter of James Tallmadge Jr.
- Cortlandt Van Rensselaer (1808–1860), a noted Presbyterian clergyman.
- Henry Bell Van Rensselaer (1810–1864), a politician and general in the Union Army during the American Civil War, who married Elizabeth Ray King, a granddaughter of Rufus King.
- Cornelia Paterson Van Rensselaer (1812–1890), who married Robert James Turnbull Jr. (1807–1854), son of Robert James Turnbull.
- Alexander Van Rensselaer (1814–1878), who married Mary Howland, daughter of merchant Samuel Shaw Howland, in 1851. In 1864, he married Louisa Barnewell.
- Euphemia White Van Rensselaer (1816–1888), who married John Church Cruger (1807–1879)
- Westerlo Van Rensselaer (1820–1844), who died aged 24.

Van Rensselaer died in New York City on January 26, 1839. He was buried in a family cemetery at the Van Rensselaer Manor House, and was later reinterred at Albany Rural Cemetery, Section 14, Lot 1.

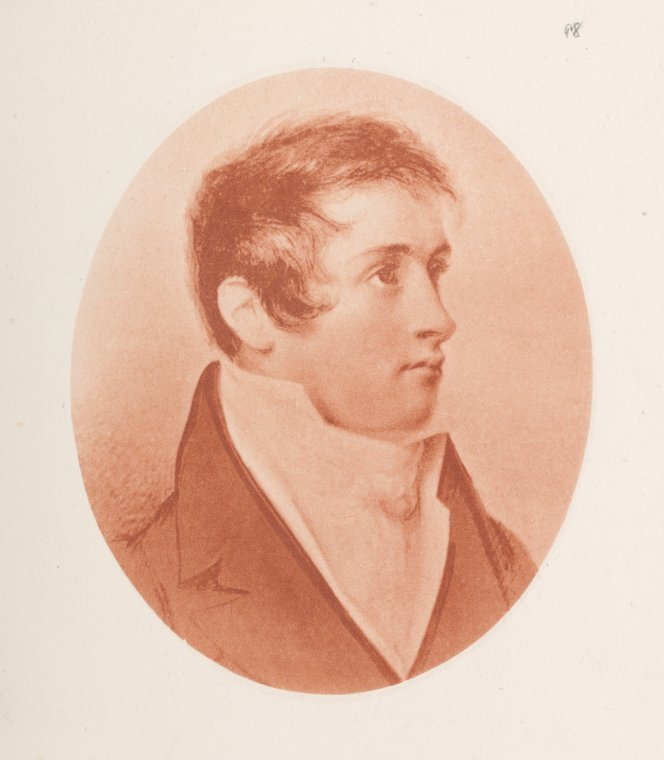
Artotype of Van Rensselaer's son, Stephen, by Edward Bierstadt, 1888

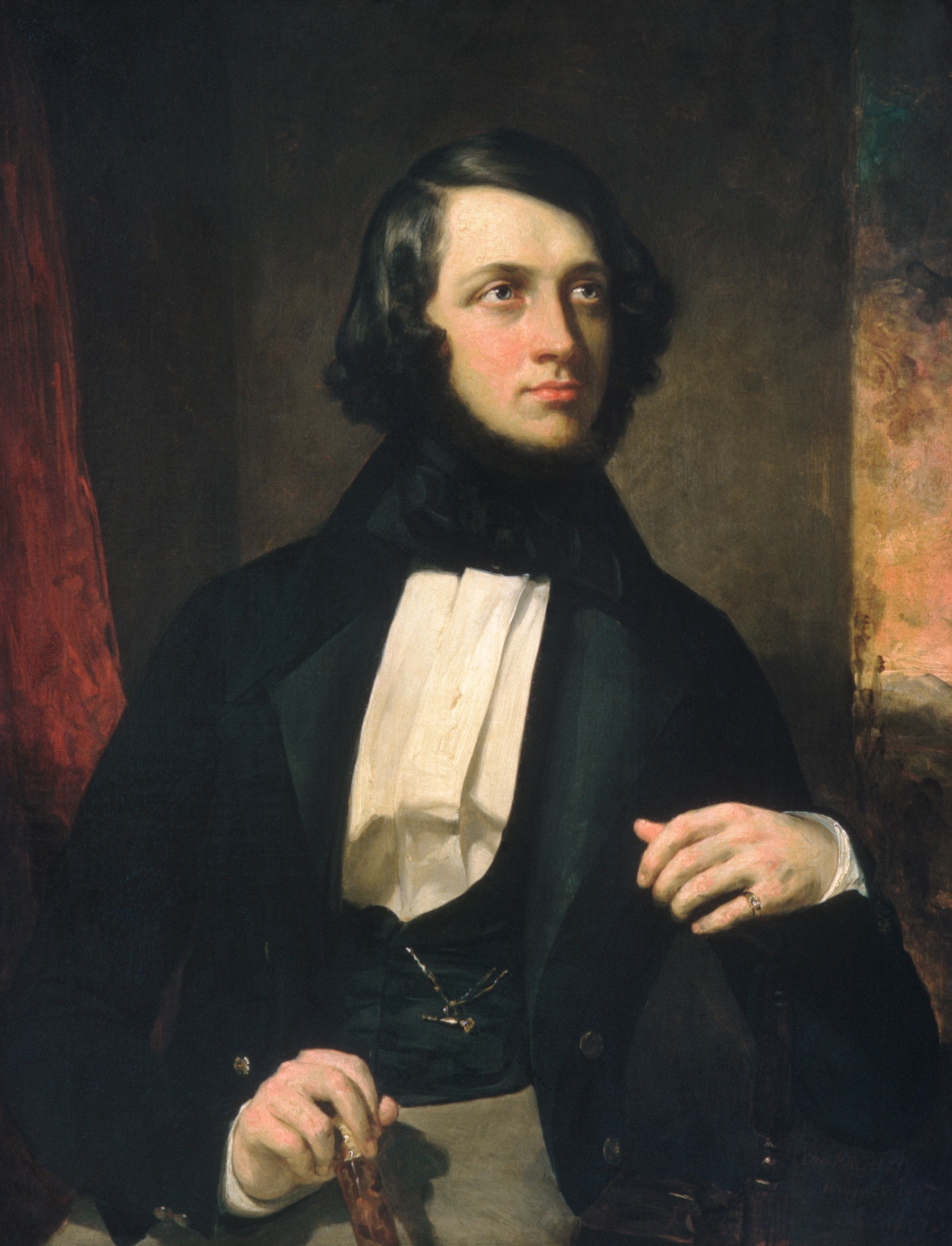
Van Rensselaer's son, Alexander, painted by George P. A. Healy, 1837

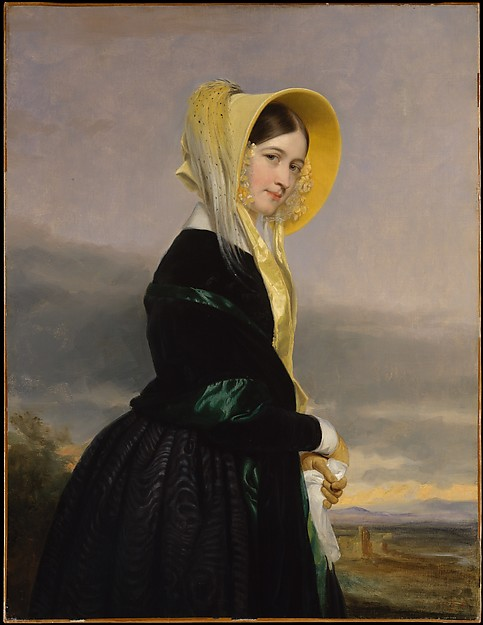
Van Rensselaer's daughter, Euphemia, painted by George P. A. Healy, 1842

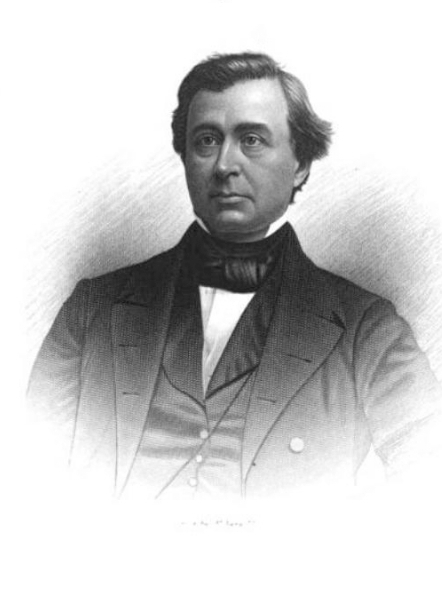
Drawing of Van Rensselaer's son, Cortlandt, 1889

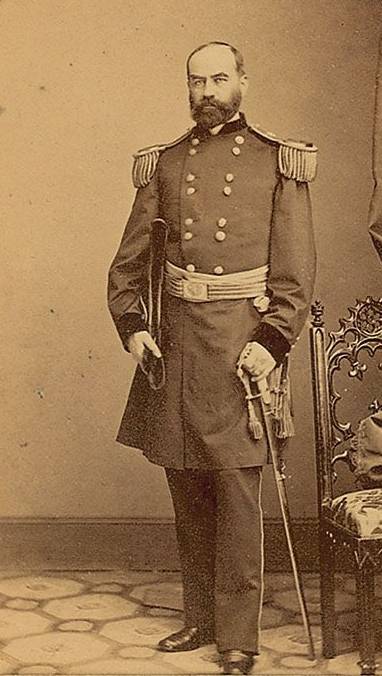
Photograph of Van Rensselaer's son, General Henry Bell

=== Descendants ===
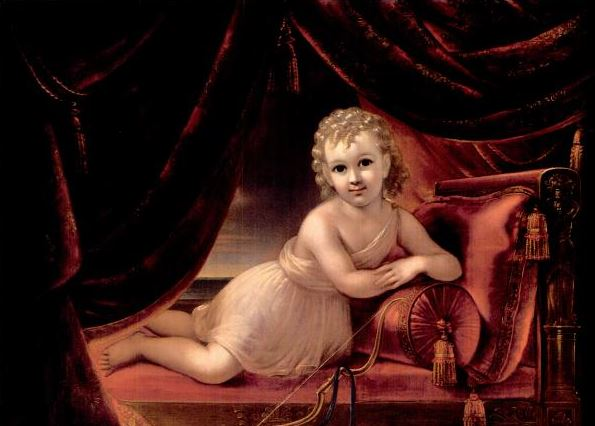
Portrait of a Child as Cupid, a portrait of Van Rensselaer's grandson, William Paterson Van Rensselaer Jr., painted by Francesco Anelli, c. 1836–37

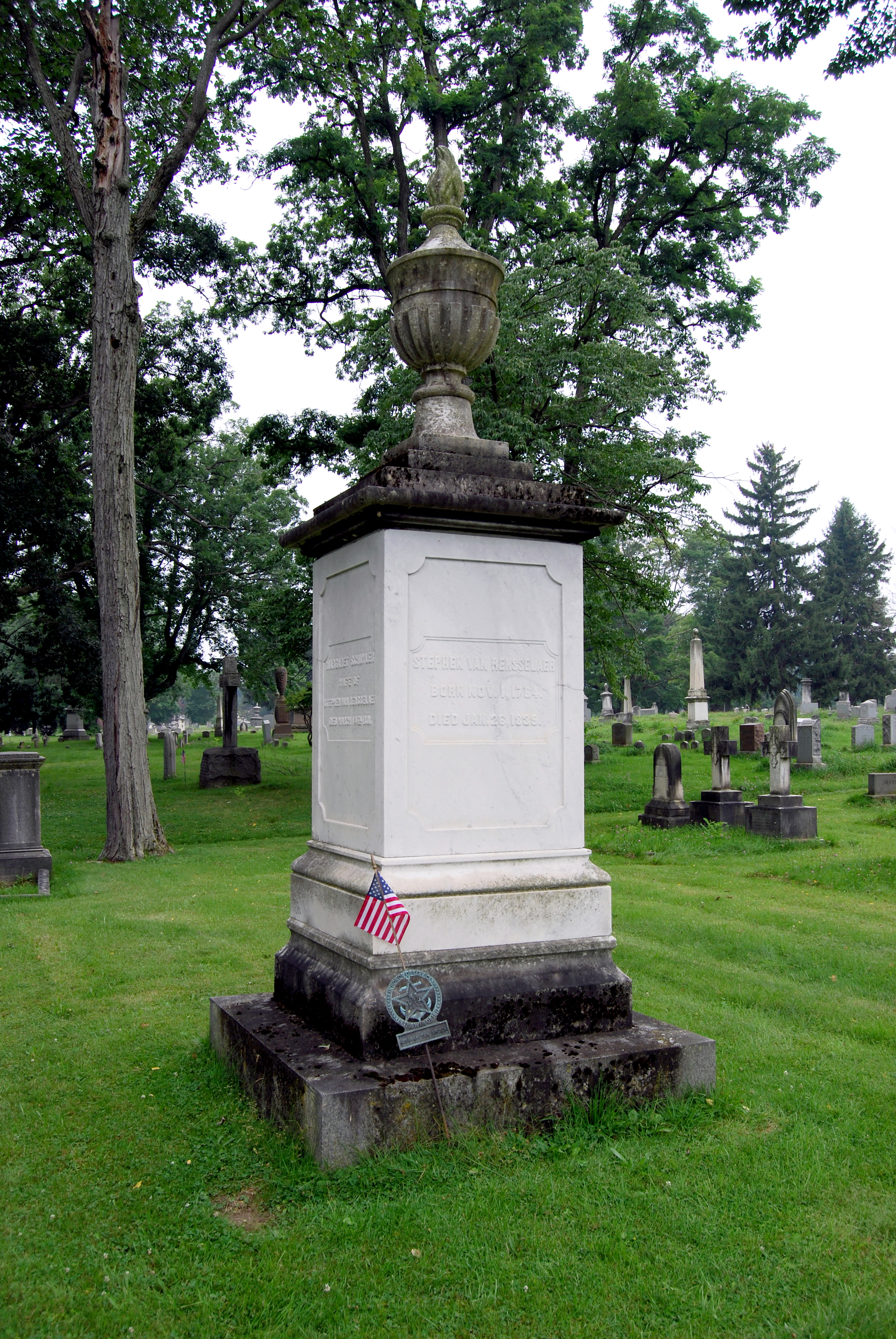
Van Rensselaer's gravesite in Albany Rural Cemetery

His granddaughter, Justine Van Rensselaer (1828–1912), married Dr. Howard Townsend, a noted physician at Albany Medical College. His grandson, Stephen Van Rensselaer Cruger married Julia Grinnell Storrow, a popular American novelist.

His great-grandson was John Eliot Thayer (1862–1933), an amateur ornithologist. His great-granddaughter, Cornelia Van Rensselaer Thayer (1849–1903) married J. Hampden Robb (1846–1911), a New York State Senator, in 1868. Their daughter—Van Rensselaer's 2× great-granddaughter, Cornelia Van Rensselaer Thayer (b. 1881)—married Danish Count Carl Moltke (1869–1935) in 1907.

Through his great-grandson, Stephen Van Rensselaer Crosby (1868–1959), he was the 2× great-grandfather of Henry Sturgis Crosby (1898–1929), a bon vivant, poet, and publisher who for some epitomized the Lost Generation in American literature, who was married to Mary Phelps Jacob (1891–1970).

Through his son Henry Bell Van Rensselaer and Henry's granddaughter Julia Floyd Delafield, Stephen Van Rensselaer was the great-great-grandfather of Floyd Crosby (1899–1985) and great-great-great-grandfather of David Crosby and Jane Wyatt.

=== Legacy and honors ===
Van Rensselaer can be counted among the top ten of the richest individuals in United States history. By one measure, his fortune would be worth approximately $150 billion in 2022. (Note: There are multiple ways that $10 million in 1839 can converted to equivalent 2022 dollars. The consumer price index, which adjusts for inflation, multiplies values by 28; the nominal per capita gross domestic product, which adjusts for inflation and increases in productivity (roughly standard of living), multiplies by 750; The nominal gross domestic product, which adjusts for inflation and increases in productivity and population, multiplies by 15,300. By that last measure, Van Rensselaer's fortune would be worth $150 billion in 2022.)

The town of Stephentown, New York is named for Stephen Van Rensselaer.

In 1791, Van Rensselaer was elected as an honorary member of the New York Society of the Cincinnati. In 1822, he received the honorary degree of LL.D. from Yale University. In 1998, the Rensselaer Polytechnic Institute Alumni Hall of Fame inducted Van Rensselaer as a member.

== See also ==
- Barthélemy Prosper Enfantin
- Henri de Saint-Simon
- Saint-Simonianism
- War of 1812
- List of richest Americans in history

== Sources ==
- Turner, Wesley B. (2011). The Astonishing General: The Life and Legacy of Sir Isaac Brock. Dundurn Books, 376 pages. ISBN 9781459700079.
- Spooner, Walter Whipple (1907). The Van Rensselaer Family. American Historical Magazine.
- Wolff, Geoffrey (1976). Black Sun. Random House Incorporated. ISBN 0-394-47450-3.

Party political offices
Preceded by John Jay	Federalist nominee for Governor of New York; 1801	Vacant Title next held by Aaron Burr; Endorsed
Preceded by Jonas Platt	Federalist nominee for Governor of New York; 1813	Succeeded by Rufus King
Political offices
Preceded by	Member of the New York State Assembly from the Albany County District, at-large 1789–1791	Succeeded by
Preceded by	Member of the New York State Senate from the Western District, at-large 1791–1796	Succeeded by
Preceded by Pierre Van Cortlandt	Lieutenant Governor of New York; 1795–1801	Succeeded by Jeremiah Van Rensselaer
U.S. House of Representatives
Preceded by Solomon Van Rensselaer	Member of the U.S. House of Representatives from New York's 9th congressional district 1822–1823	Succeeded by James L. Hogeboom
Preceded by John D. Dickinson	Member of the U.S. House of Representatives from New York's 10th congressional district 1823–1829	Succeeded by Ambrose Spencer
Masonic offices
Preceded by Joseph Enos	Grand Master of the Grand Lodge of New York; 1825–1829	Succeeded by Morgan Lewis
Academic offices
Preceded by Simeon De Witt	Chancellor of the University of the State of New York; 1835–1839	Succeeded by James King
