= Beverwyck Manor =

Historic house in New York, United States

- U.S. National Register of Historic Places
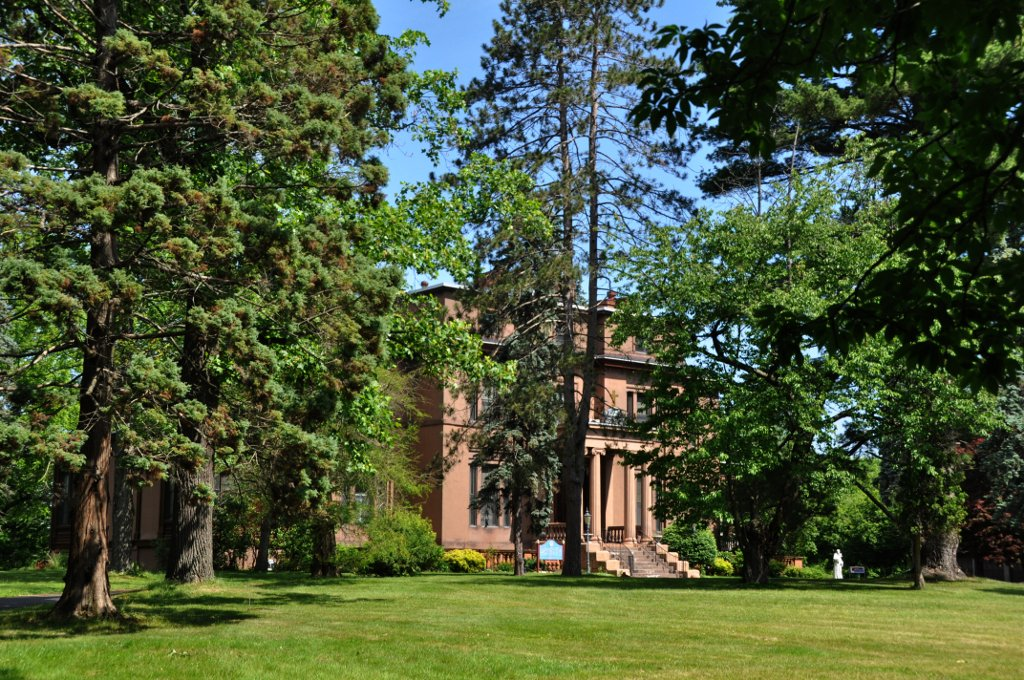
- Beverwyck Manor

- Location within New York Location within the United States
- Location: St.Anthonys Lane., Rensselaer, New York
- Coordinates: 42°39′48″N 73°43′22″W
- Area: 1.9 acres (0.77 ha)
- Built: 1839
- Architect: Frederick Diaper
- Architectural style: Greek Revival, English & French Neo-classic
- NRHP reference No.: 79001621
- Added to NRHP: August 3, 1979

Beverwyck Manor is a historic home located at Rensselaer in Rensselaer County, New York. It was built between 1839 and 1842. It is constructed of stucco over brick and consists of a three-story, three bay wide central block with the central bay recessed. The central block is flanked by two story, single bay extensions. It has a restrained Neoclassical facade and features a one bay portico with stone steps and four Ionic order stone columns. It was built by William Paterson Van Rensselaer and later became part St. Anthony-on-Hudson Seminary, a Franciscan Seminary.

The Seminary closed in 1989. The manor was used as a retreat center for a time, and then converted to a residence for staff and retired Franciscans.

It was listed on the National Register of Historic Places in 1979.

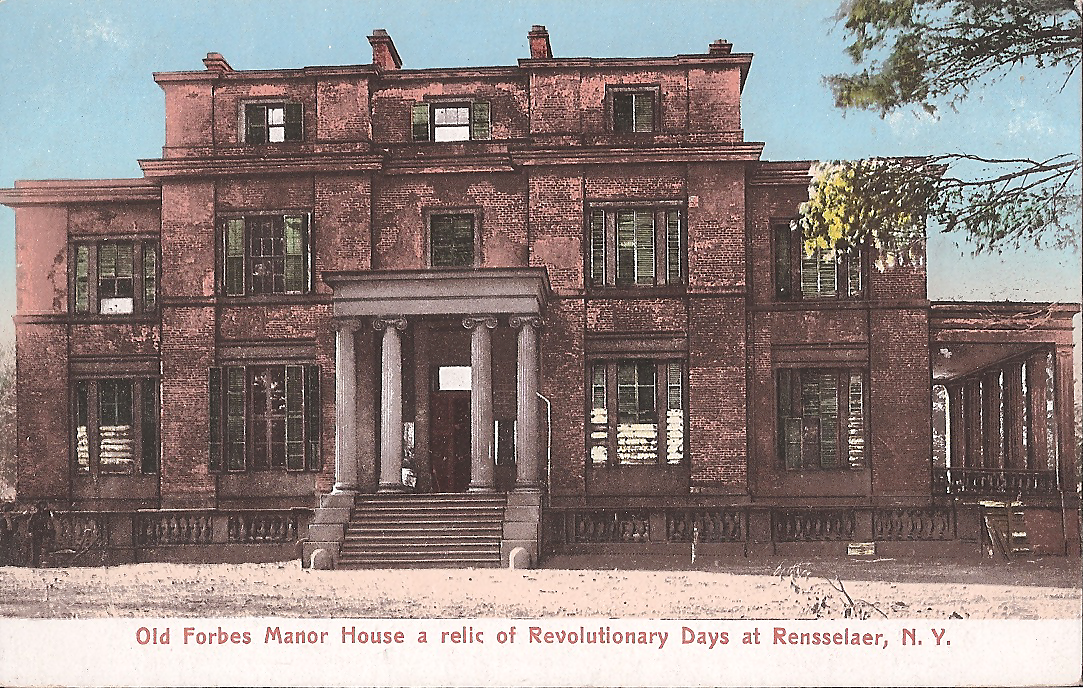
