= Joseph Dudley =

Royal governor of Massachusetts (1647–1720)

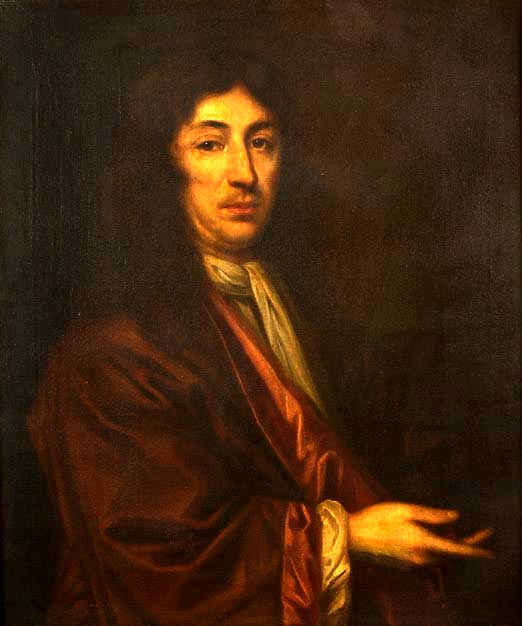
- Portrait believed to be of Dudley by Sir Peter Lely

President of the Dominion of New England
- In office May 25, 1686 – December 20, 1686
- Preceded by: Simon Bradstreet (as governor of the Massachusetts Bay Colony)
- Succeeded by: Sir Edmund Andros (as governor of the Dominion of New England)

Member of Parliament for Newtown, Isle of Wight
- In office 1701–1702 Serving with Thomas Hopsonn
- Preceded by: James Worsley
- Succeeded by: John Leigh

3rd and 4th Governor of the Province of Massachusetts Bay
- In office June 11, 1702 – February 4, 1715
- Preceded by: Massachusetts Governor's Council (acting)
- Succeeded by: Massachusetts Governor's Council (acting)
- In office March 21, 1715 – November 9, 1715
- Preceded by: Council of Assistants (acting)
- Succeeded by: William Tailer (acting)

Member of the Council of Assistants
- In office 1676–1684

Personal details
- Born: September 23, 1647 Roxbury, Massachusetts Bay Colony
- Died: 2 April 1720 (aged 72) Roxbury, Province of Massachusetts Bay
- Spouse: Rebecca Tyng (m. 1668)
- Children: Paul Dudley
- Parent: Thomas Dudley (father)
- Education: Harvard College

Joseph Dudley (September 23, 1647 – April 2, 1720) was a colonial administrator, a native of Roxbury in Massachusetts Bay Colony, and the son of one of its founders. He had a leading role in the administration of the Dominion of New England (1686–1689), which was overthrown in the 1689 Boston revolt. He served briefly on the council of the Province of New York, from which he oversaw the trial which convicted Jacob Leisler, the ringleader of Leisler's Rebellion. He then spent eight years in England in the 1690s as Lieutenant-Governor of the Isle of Wight, including one year as a Member of Parliament for Newtown (Isle of Wight). In 1702, he returned to New England after being appointed governor of the Province of Massachusetts Bay and Province of New Hampshire, posts that he held until 1715.

His rule of Massachusetts was characterized by hostility and tension, with political enemies opposing his attempts to gain a regular salary and regularly making complaints about his official and private actions. Most of his tenure was dominated by the French and Indian Wars, in which the two provinces were on the front lines with New France and suffered from a series of major and minor French and Indian raids. He orchestrated an unsuccessful attempt to capture the Acadian capital of Port Royal in 1707, raised provincial militia forces for its successful capture in 1710, and directed an unsuccessful expedition against Quebec in 1711.

Dudley's governorship initiated a hostility in Massachusetts toward royal governance, most frequently over the issue of the salaries of crown officials. The colonial legislature routinely challenged or disputed the prerogatives of the governor, and this hostility affected most of the governors of Massachusetts up to the American Revolutionary War and the end of British rule. Dudley's rule of New Hampshire, however, was comparatively uncontroversial.

== Early life ==
Joseph Dudley was born in Roxbury, Massachusetts Bay Colony, on September 23, 1647. His mother was Katherine Dudley (née Dighton or Deighton; formerly Hackburne) and his father was Thomas Dudley, one of the founders and leading magistrates of the colony. His father was 70 when he was born and died in 1653. His mother then married Reverend John Allin, who raised the young Dudley at his home in Dedham, Massachusetts.

He graduated from Harvard College in 1665 and was admitted as a freeman in 1672. He became a member of the Massachusetts General Court representing Roxbury in 1673, and he was elected to the colony's council of assistants in 1676. King Philip's War broke out in 1675, and Dudley was a commissioner who accompanied the colonial militia into the field against the Indians. He was present at the Great Swamp Fight in which the Narragansett people was decisively defeated. In 1679, Dudley was recorded as owning an enslaved Native American girl. Dudley served for several years as a commissioner to the New England Confederation, and was sent by the administration on diplomatic missions to neighboring Indian communities. He served on a committee that negotiated the boundary between Massachusetts and the Plymouth Colony.

== Revocation of the colonial charter ==
The colony's governance came under the scrutiny of King Charles II in the 1660s, and it faced a substantial threat in the late 1670s. Crown agent Edward Randolph was sent to New England in 1676 to collect customs duties and to enforce the Navigation Acts, and in the process he documented a list of issues and took his complaints to the Lords of Trade in London. The colonial leadership was divided on how to answer this threat. Dudley was part of a moderate faction which supported accommodating the king's demands, along with his brother-in-law Simon Bradstreet and William Stoughton, and they were opposed by others who did not want the crown to interfere in the colony's business. These factions were separated in part along class lines; the wealthier land owners and merchants who dominated the legislature's upper house (called the "court of assistants") favored accommodation, while the more representative lower house favored the opposition view.

In 1682, Massachusetts sent Dudley and John Richards to London as agents to represent its case to the Lords of Trade. Dudley brought a letter of introduction from Plymouth Governor Thomas Hinckley to colonial secretary William Blathwayt, and the favorable relationship that he established with Blathwayt contributed to his future success as a colonial administrator, but it also raised suspicions in the colony about his motives and ability to represent the colony's interests. The authority of the agents was limited, and the Lords of Trade insisted to the colonial administration that their agents be authorized to negotiate modifications to the colonial charter. The legislature refused this demand, which led to a quo warranto writ demanding the surrender of the colonial charter. Dudley brought this news to Boston at the end of 1683, igniting a heated debate in the legislature, with the opposition party again prevailing. The leadership of the opposition included Reverend Increase Mather, and they began to view the accommodationists as enemies of the colony, including Dudley and Bradstreet. Richards sided with the opposition, and Dudley was removed from the council of assistants in the 1684 election.

The episode also led to accusations that Dudley had secretly schemed in London to have the charter vacated as a means of personal advancement. He did discuss the form of a replacement government with Edward Randolph, although this discussion did not take place until after the quo warranto writ was issued. The opposition viewed this as evidence that he was hostile to the present order of the colony and was working against his commission as colonial agent. Randolph, in contrast, believed that Dudley's election loss meant that he would make a good crown servant. As a result, rumors began circulating in Boston in late 1684 that Dudley might be appointed governor, with Randolph as his deputy.

The charter was annulled in 1684, and the Lords of Trade began planning to combine the New England colonies into a single province called the Dominion of New England. This work was still in progress when King James II took the throne in 1685. However, there were difficulties in drafting a commission for intended governor Sir Edmund Andros, and this prompted Randolph to propose an interim appointment. Dudley was chosen for this post based on Randolph's recommendation, and a commission was issued to him on October 8, 1685, as President of the Council of New England. The territories covered by his commission included the Massachusetts Bay Colony, the Province of New Hampshire, the Province of Maine, and the "Narragansett Country", a territory at the heart of the Colony of Rhode Island and Providence Plantations (which both Massachusetts Bay and Connecticut Colony were trying to wrest away from Rhode Island). Randolph was appointed to a long list of subsidiary posts, including secretary of the colony, which gave him considerable power.

== President of the Council of New England ==
Randolph arrived in Boston with Dudley's charter on May 14, 1686, and Dudley formally took charge of Massachusetts on May 25, but his rule did not begin auspiciously. A number of Massachusetts magistrates had been named to his council but they refused to serve, and he was unable to reconcile with Increase Mather, who refused to see him. According to Randolph, the Puritan magistrates "were of opinion that God would never suffer me to land again in this country, and thereupon began in a most arbitrary manner to assert their power higher than at any time before." Elections of colonial military officers were compromised when many of them also refused to serve. Dudley made a number of judicial appointments, generally favoring the political moderates who had supported accommodation of the king's wishes in the battle over the old charter. He renewed treaties with the Indians of northern New England, and traveled to the Narragansett Country in June to formally establish his authority there.

Dudley was significantly hampered by the inability to raise revenues in the dominion. His commission did not give him authority to introduce new revenue laws, and the Massachusetts government had repealed all such laws in 1683 in anticipation of losing their charter. Furthermore, many people refused to pay the remaining taxes on the grounds that they had been enacted by the old government and were thus invalid. Dudley and Randolph also attempted to introduce the Church of England into New England, but they were largely unsuccessful; they did not have buildings to house their new churches, and they recognized the danger of forcing Colonial churches to share their buildings with the Church of England.

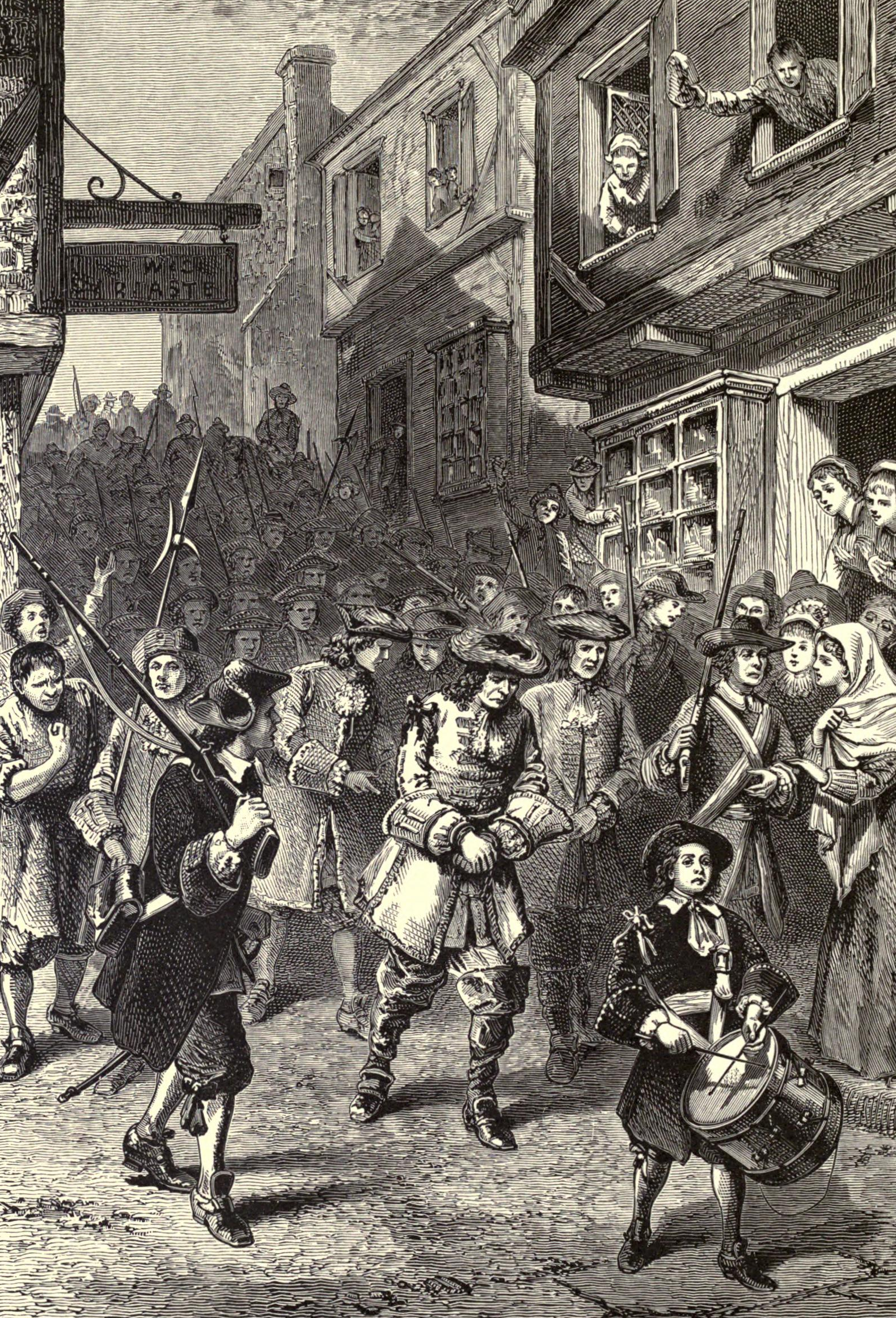
Engraving depicting the arrest of Sir Edmund Andros in 1689

Dudley and Randolph enforced the Navigation Acts, although they did not adhere to the letter of the law, understanding that some provisions of the acts were unfair, such as requiring payments of multiple duties. Some violations were overlooked, and they suggested to the Lords of Trade that the laws be modified to ameliorate these conditions. Nevertheless, the Massachusetts economy was harmed by their otherwise vigorous enforcement of the acts.

Dudley and Randolph eventually had a falling out over matters related to trade, administration, and religion. "I am treated by Mr. Dudley worse than by Mr. Danforth", Randolph wrote, comparing Dudley to one of the opposition magistrates.

While Dudley governed, the Lords of Trade decided to include the colonies of Rhode Island and Connecticut in the dominion, based on a petition from Dudley's council. Andros' commission had been issued in June, and he was given an annex to the commission with instructions to bring Rhode Island and Connecticut under his authority.

== Service under Governor Andros ==
Governor Andros arrived in December 1686 and immediately assumed the reins of power. Dudley sat on his council and served as judge of the superior court and censor of the press. He also sat on the committee that worked to harmonize legislation throughout the dominion. Andros' appointed council was intended to represent all of the combined territories. However, travel was difficult, and the government did not reimburse travel expenses; consequently, his council was dominated by representatives from Boston and Plymouth.

Dudley and Randolph were widely regarded as a significant part of the tyranny of Andros' reign. Dudley's position as judge brought him the harshest criticisms and complaints, in particular when he enforced unpopular laws imposed by Andros concerning taxes, town meetings, and land titles. During this period, Dudley acquired ownership over a slave named Peter.

Word arrived in April 1689 of the 1688 Glorious Revolution, whereupon citizens rose up and arrested Andros. Dudley was away from the city but was arrested upon his return. Since he was ill, he was released into house arrest upon payment of a £1,000 bond, but a group descended on his home and carried him back to jail. He stayed in jail for ten months, in part for his own safety, and was then sent back to England at the command of King William, along with Andros and other dominion leaders. Colonial authorities brought charges against Andros and Dudley, but none of their agents in London were prepared to take responsibility for making those charges in court, so they were dismissed and both men were freed.

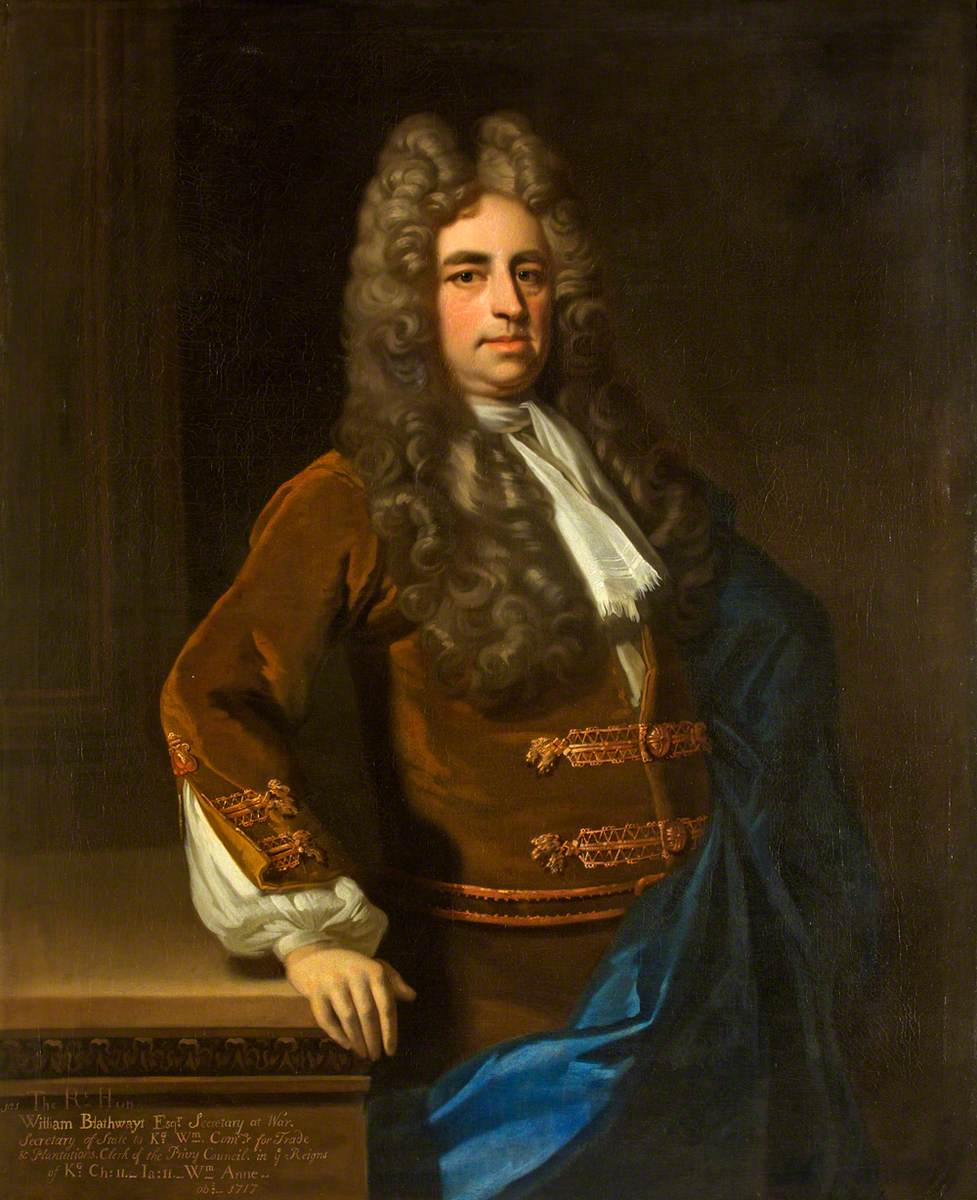
William Blathwayt helped further Dudley's career.

Dudley was stranded in London with limited connections, so he appealed to Blathwayt for assistance. He also asked business associate Daniel Coxe for help in finding a new position. Coxe was a proprietor of West Jersey and he considered Dudley for the post of lieutenant governor there, and Dudley was eventually recommended as chief of council to New York governor Henry Sloughter which he took up in 1691. In addition to his council duties, he negotiated with New York's Indians and sat as chief judge in the trial of Jacob Leisler, who had led the rebellion in 1689 that overthrew Andros' lieutenant governor Francis Nicholson. The trial was controversial, and Dudley's role made him many enemies. Leisler was convicted of high treason and sentenced to death. Governor Sloughter was initially opposed to immediately executing Leisler and his main ally and son-in-law Jacob Milborne, preferring to defer the decision to the king. But he changed his mind under pressure from anti-Leisler forces in his council, and the two men were executed on 16 May 1691. Cotton Mather claimed that Dudley was an influential force arguing for Leisler's execution, although this is disputed by testimony from anti-Leisler councillor Nicholas Bayard.

Dudley left New York for his home in Roxbury in 1692 and re-established connections with political friends such as William Stoughton, who had just been appointed lieutenant governor of the newly chartered Province of Massachusetts Bay under Sir William Phips.

== Patronage ==
Dudley returned to England in 1693 and embarked on a series of intrigues to regain an office in New England. He ingratiated himself to the religious elements of the London political establishment by formally joining the Church of England. He acquired a patron in Baron Cutts, who engineered his appointment as Lieutenant Governor of the Isle of Wight where Cutts had been appointed Governor. Dudley and Cutts assisted each other politically; Cutts worked to advance Dudley's agenda in London, while Dudley worked to promote that of Cutts on the Isle of Wight. Dudley manipulated the parliamentary election processes on the island to ensure that Cutts' chosen candidates were elected, which made Cutts highly unpopular on the Isle of Wight — although he continued as its governor until his death in 1707. Dudley also tried to assist Cutts with some financial difficulties, and he schemed with Cutts' father-in-law to gain permission to mint coins for use in New England.

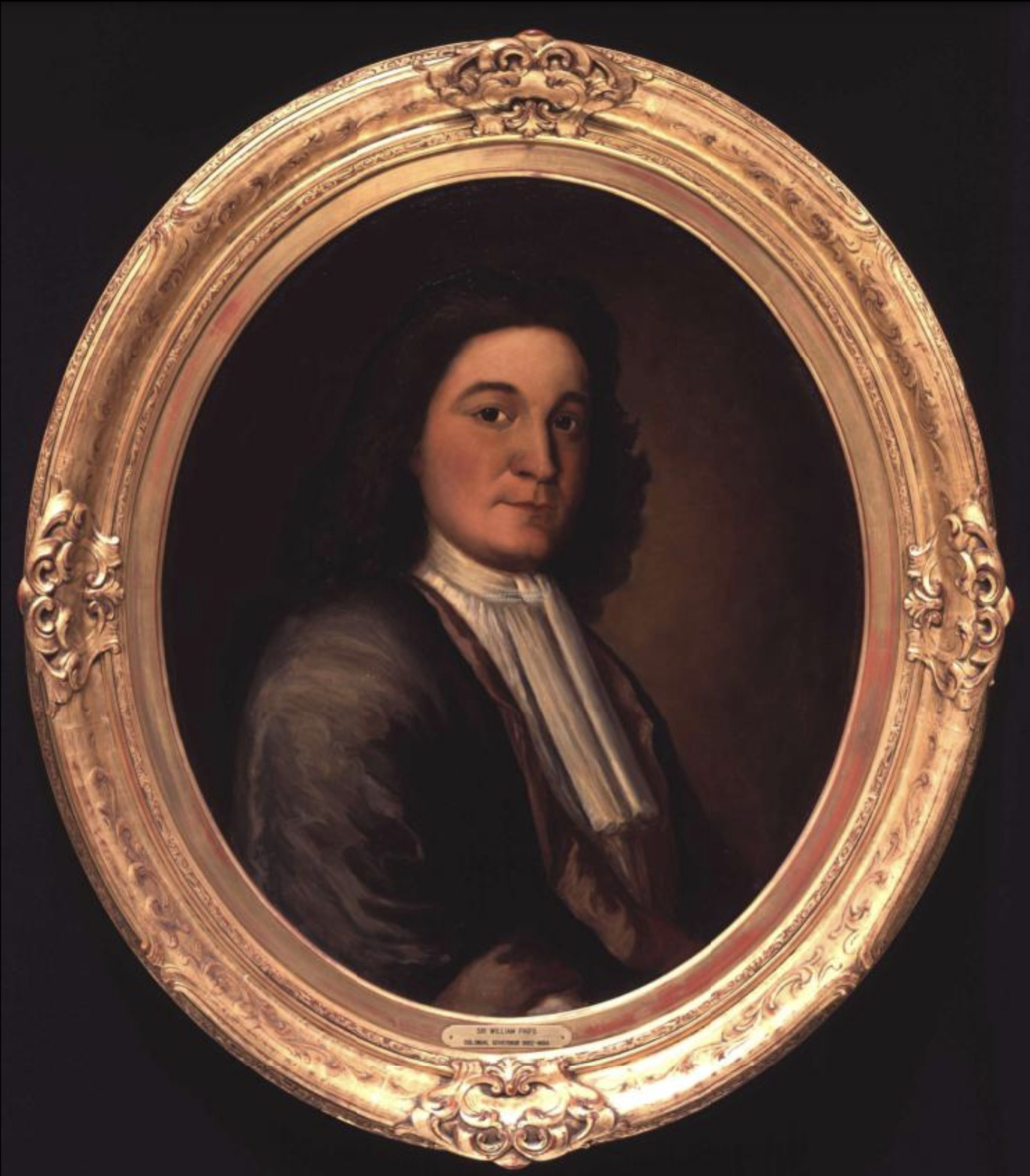
Sir William Phips, whom Dudley sought to supplant as governor of Massachusetts

Dudley's principal object of intrigue was the removal of William Phips as Massachusetts governor, something that he did not hide from the colony's agents. Phips' rule was unpopular in Massachusetts, and he was recalled to England to answer a variety of charges brought by his opponents. Dudley caused Phips to be arrested shortly after his arrival, on the charge that Phips had withheld customs money from the crown. Phips died in February 1695 before the charges were heard, and Dudley was optimistic that he would be named the next governor.

At this point, Dudley's enemies from New York and Massachusetts joined forces to deny him the opportunity. Jacob Leisler's son was in London attempting to have the attainder reversed against his father's estate. A bill was introduced into Parliament to accomplish this, with assistance from Massachusetts agent Constantine Phips. The debate included a review of Leisler's trial, and Dudley was forced to appear and defend his role in it. Afterward, Phips wrote to Cotton Mather that Dudley "is not so much talked of to be governor", and the appointment went instead to Lord Bellomont.

Cutts continued to be active on Dudley's behalf, and he secured him election as a Member of Parliament representing Newtown in 1701. This made it possible for Dudley to further expand his own political connections in London. He managed temporarily to mend political fences with Constantine Phips and Cotton Mather, and he began lobbying for the Massachusetts governorship after the death of Bellomont in 1701. In this he was successful, receiving commissions as governor of Massachusetts and New Hampshire on 1 April 1702 from Queen Anne.

== Governor of Massachusetts and New Hampshire ==
Dudley served as governor until 1715, and his administration was marked by regular conflict with the general court, particularly in the early years. His instruction from the English colonial office was to gain a regular salary for the governor. He and all of the succeeding royal governors, however, were unsuccessful in extracting this concession from the Colonial legislature, and it became a regular source of friction between representatives of crown and colony. Dudley pressed his complaint in letters to London, in which he complained of men "who love not the Crown and Government of England to any manner of obedience". He wrote in one letter to his son Paul, then the provincial attorney general, "this country will never be worth living in for lawyers and gentlemen, till the charter is taken away." This letter was discovered and published, fueling Colonial opposition to his rule. Dudley also angered the powerful Mather family when he awarded the presidency of Harvard to John Leverett instead of Cotton Mather. He consistently vetoed the election of councilors and speakers of the general court who had acted against him in 1689, further increasing his unpopularity in Massachusetts. In contrast, his tenure as Governor of New Hampshire was popular; its legislature specifically praised him to the Queen after learning of complaints levelled against him by his Massachusetts opponents.

=== Queen Anne's War ===
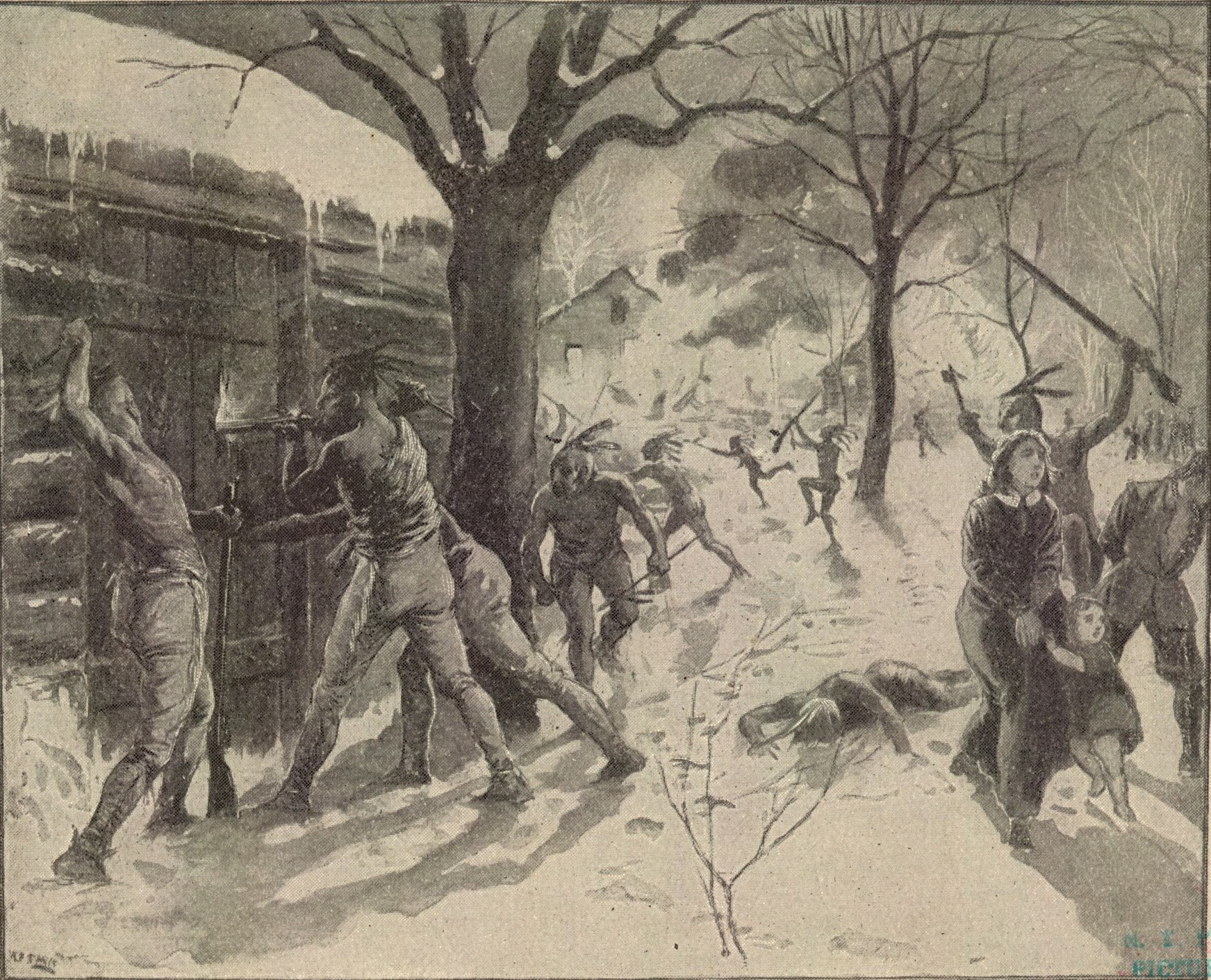
Depiction of the 1704 Raid on Deerfield

Dudley was active in managing colonial defenses during Queen Anne's War. He attempted to forestall French-orchestrated Indian hostilities by meeting with Indians at Casco Bay in June 1703, but the French had already begun rallying them to their cause and the war began with raids on the settlements of southern Maine in August 1703. Dudley called out the militia and licensed privateers to raid French shipping, such as Thomas Larimore; he also fortified the Massachusetts and New Hampshire frontiers from the Connecticut River to southern Maine. The French and Indians raided Deerfield in February 1704, prompting calls for retaliation, and Dudley authorized aging Indian fighter Benjamin Church to lead an expedition against settlements in Acadia. He also engaged in protracted negotiations for the return of captives taken at Deerfield.

Boston merchants and the Mathers accused Dudley of being in league with smugglers and others who were illegally trading with the French, in part because he specifically refused permission for Church to attack the Acadian capital and commercial center of Port Royal. He sought to forestall these criticisms in 1707 when he sent the colonial militia on a fruitless expedition against Port Royal. In 1708, a bitter attack on his administration was published in London entitled The Deplorable State of New England by reason of a Covetous and Treacherous Governor and Pusillanimous Counsellors, as part of a campaign to have him recalled. Dudley again rallied the provincial militias for a planned expedition against Quebec in 1709, but the supporting expedition from England was called off. Support arrived from England in 1710, and a successful siege led to the fall of Port Royal and the beginning of the Province of Nova Scotia.

Boston was again the organizing point for the 1711 Quebec Expedition combining British and provincial forces. The expedition failed disastrously, however, when some of its transports foundered on the shores of the Saint Lawrence River. During the war, Dudley also authorized expeditions against the Abenakis of northern New England, but these were largely ineffective. The war quieted to some extent after the fall of Port Royal, with only small raiding parties hitting frontier communities, and peace came in 1713 with the Treaty of Utrecht.

Dudley negotiated a separate peace with the Abenakis at Portsmouth, New Hampshire in 1713. He hoped to separate the western Kennebec tribe from French influence and consequently adopted a fairly hard line, threatening to withhold trade that was vital to their survival and reiterating claims of British sovereignty over them. The Treaty of Portsmouth (1713) resulted from those negotiations and repeated the claims of sovereignty. Dudley claimed that the French had ceded Abenaki lands as part of Acadia, and one sachem responded: "The French never said anything to us about it, and we wonder how they would give it away without asking us". Nevertheless, Dudley and succeeding governors treated the Abenaki as British subjects, and friction persisted over British colonial expansion into Maine which flared into Dummer's War in the 1720s.

=== Other issues ===
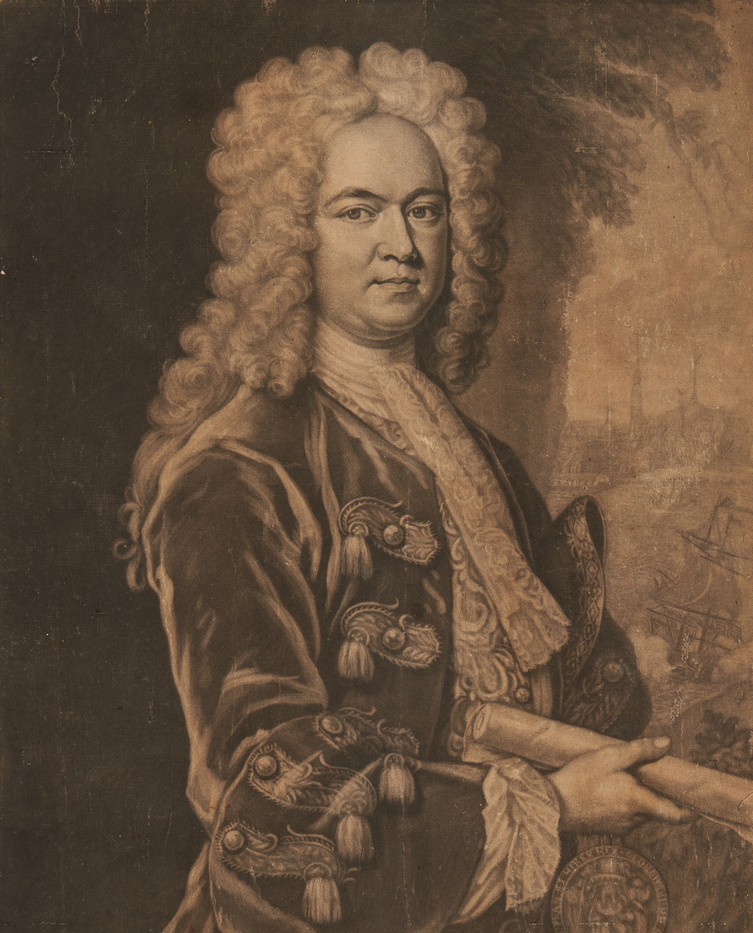
Jonathan Belcher, who represented Dudley's interests in London

The war worsened currency and finance problems in Massachusetts. The province had been issuing paper currency since the 1690s, and the issue of large amounts of this currency was causing it to depreciate compared to precious metals used in other currencies. The situation caused a division between the colonists and the governor which was not repaired until the 1760s. Business leaders who borrowed money were happy to pay it back later with depreciated currency, while lenders sought reforms to stabilize the currency. In 1714, Dudley's opponents proposed that a bank should issue as much as £50,000 in currency, secured by the shareholder's real estate properties. Dudley was opposed to this scheme, and instead convinced the provincial legislature to issue £50,000 in bills of credit. The financially powerful interests whom he upset with this move proved to be his downfall.

In 1713, surveys determined that the border between Massachusetts and the Connecticut Colony had been incorrectly sited in the 17th century, and that Massachusetts had consequently distributed lands that actually belonged to Connecticut. Dudley and Connecticut Governor Gurdon Saltonstall negotiated an agreement in which Massachusetts would retain those lands but would grant to Connecticut an equivalent amount of land. The Equivalent Lands amounted to over 100,000 acres (400 km^{2}) on either side of the Connecticut River in northern Massachusetts, southeastern Vermont, and southwestern New Hampshire. These lands were auctioned off in April 1716, and Connecticut used the proceeds to fund Yale College.

Dudley's commission expired in 1714, six months after the death of Queen Anne, as did that of Lieutenant Governor William Tailer. The governor's council was dominated by his political opponents, and they asserted its authority at that point. They assumed control of the government on February 14, 1715, under the provisions of the provincial charter concerning governance in the absence of the governor and his lieutenant. Just six weeks later, news arrived from England that Dudley's commission had been temporarily confirmed by King George I, and he was reinstated on March 21.

However, Dudley's political opponents were active in London, especially those involved in the land bank proposal, and they convinced the king to appoint Colonel Elizeus Burges as governor later in the year. Burges' commission was proclaimed in Boston on November 9, 1715, ending Dudley's commission. Burges was not in the colony, so governance fell to Lieutenant Governor Tailer whose commission had been renewed. Jonathan Belcher and Jeremiah Dummer, the brother of Dudley's son-in-law William Dummer, bribed Burges to resign his commission without leaving England in April 1716, and a new commission was issued to Samuel Shute, who promised to oppose attempts to introduce the land bank. He arrived in the colony and assumed the post of governor in October 1716, with William Dummer as his lieutenant.

Dudley retired to the family home in Roxbury. He acted as an informal advisor to Governor Shute upon his arrival, and made appearances at public and private functions. He died in Roxbury on April 2, 1720, and was buried next to his father in Roxbury's Eliot Burying Ground, accompanied with the pomp and ceremony appropriate to his position.

== Family and legacy ==
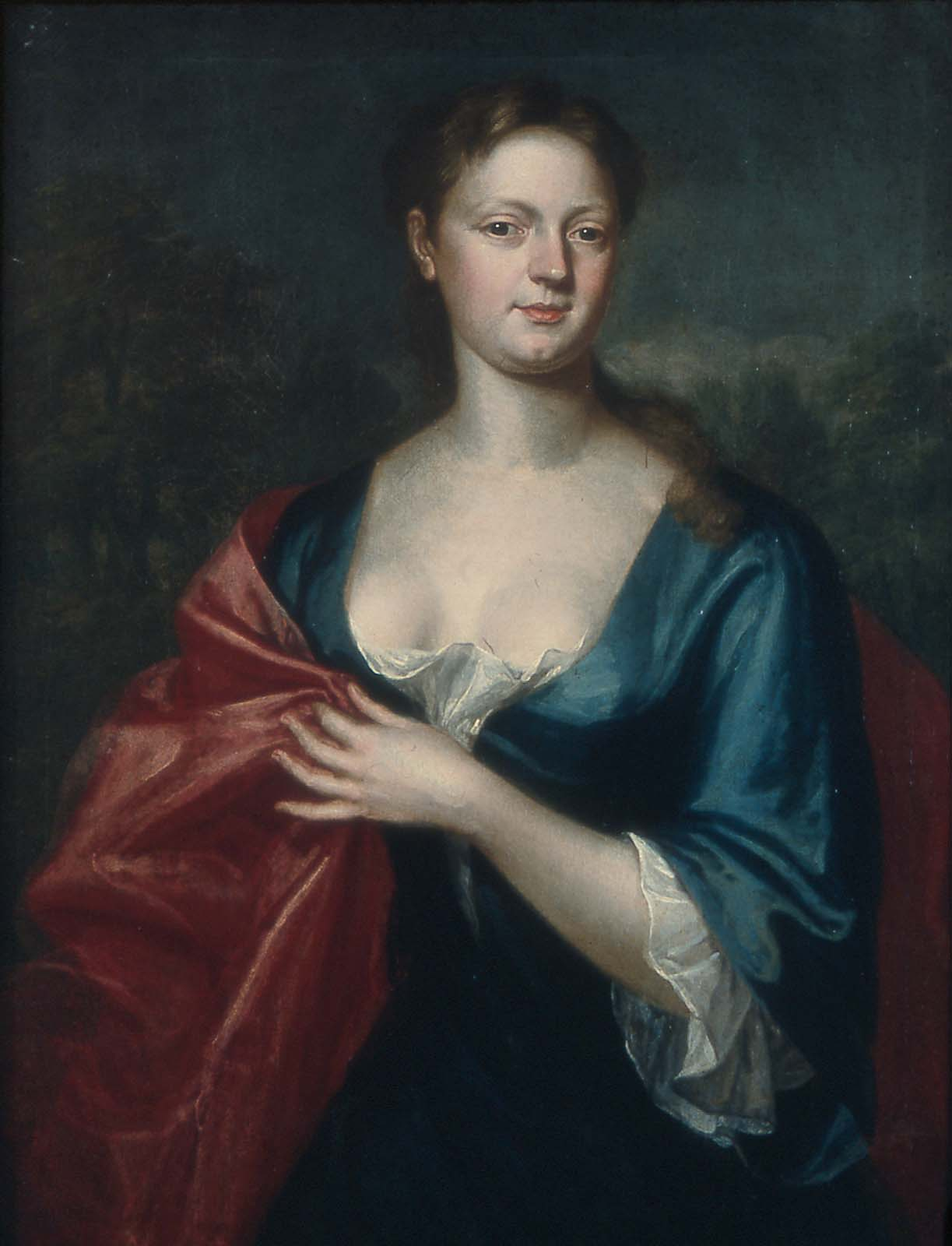
Elizabeth Davenport (Mrs. William Dudley), 1729, by John Smibert

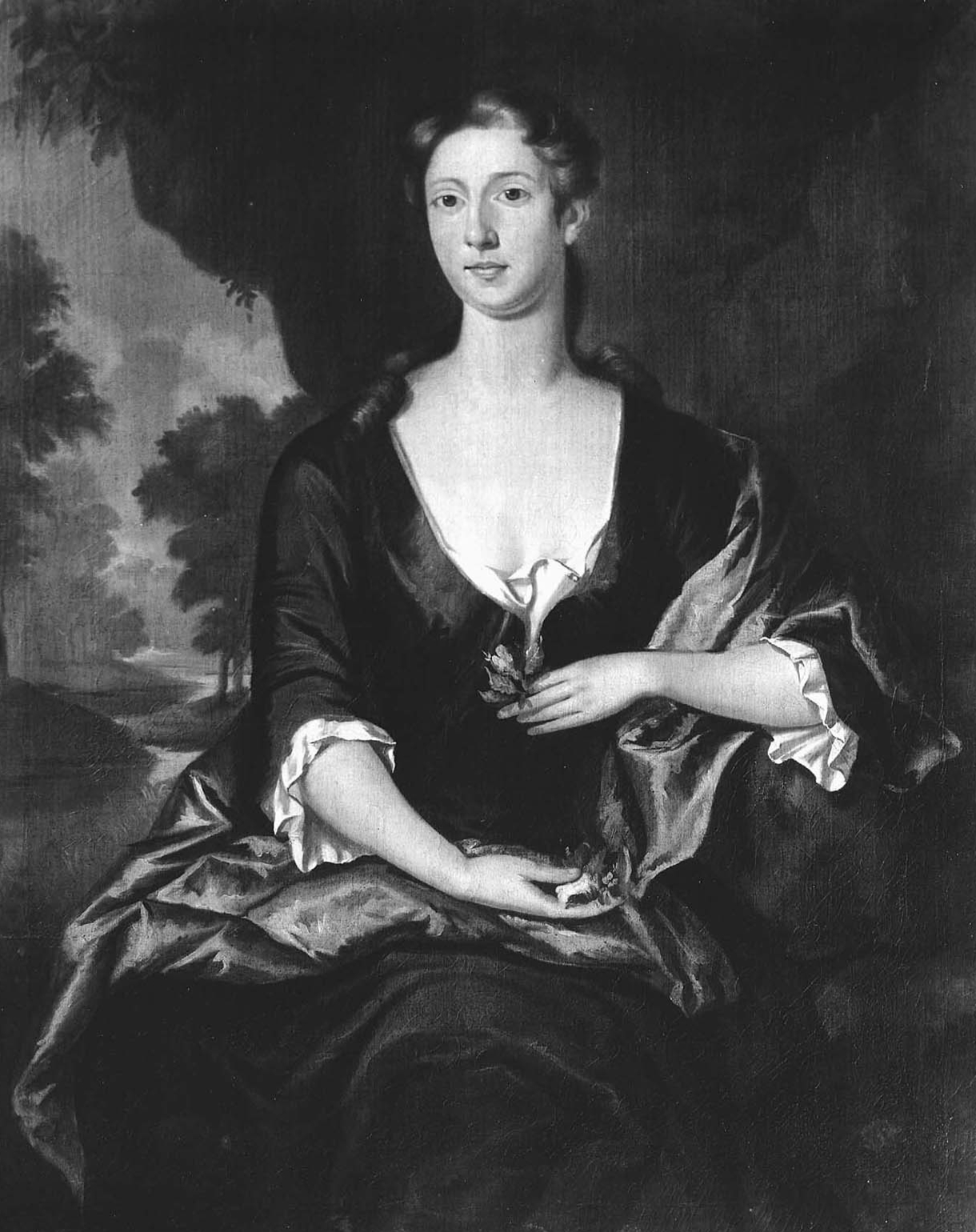
Catherine Winthrop Sargent married 1744 as the second wife of Col. Epes Sargent, from a portrait by Smybert which is in the Museum of Fine Arts, Boston.

In 1668, Dudley married Rebecca Tyng, who survived him by two years. They had 12 children, 10 of whom survived to adulthood. His son Paul served as attorney general and chief justice of Massachusetts, and Dudley, Massachusetts is named for his sons Paul and William, who were its first proprietors. His daughter Katherine Dudley married Lt. Governor William Dummer; another daughter Ann Dudley married John Winthrop (1681–1747), son of Wait Winthrop, grandson of John Winthrop the Younger and great-grandson of John Winthrop, Governor of the Massachusetts Bay Colony. John Winthrop and Ann Dudley were parents of Catherine [Winthrop] wife of Colonel Epes Sargent the parents of Paul Dudley Sargent (1745-1828).

Dudley owned large tracts of land in Massachusetts when he died, principally in Roxbury and Worcester County. The Worcester properties he purchased from the Nipmuc in partnership with William Stoughton, and he was granted land in Oxford, Massachusetts for the purpose of settling French Huguenots. He frequently used his position to ensure that his land titles were judicially cleared, especially when president of the dominion and governor of the province. This was a practice that also benefited friends, relatives, and business partners. Edward Randolph wrote that it was "impossible to bring titles of land to trial before them where his Majesties's rights are concerned, the Judges also being parties." From 1713 to 1722, Dudley was recorded as owning a slave named Brill.

Historian John Palfrey wrote that Dudley "united rich intellectual attributes with a groveling soul", forging political connections and relationships in his early years for the purpose of his own advancement. He capitalized on his favorable family connections to the Puritan leadership of Massachusetts to establish connections in England, but then betrayed those Massachusetts connections when it became necessary to further his quest for power. Thomas Hutchinson also served as provincial governor and wrote an extensive history of Massachusetts; he wrote that Dudley "had as many virtues as can consist with so great a thirst for honour and power." Biographer Everett Kimball adds that Dudley "possessed a good deal of tact and personal charm, by which, when everything else failed, he could sometimes transform an enemy into a friend."

== See also ==
- List of colonial governors of Massachusetts
- List of colonial governors of New Hampshire
- List of governors of the Isle of Wight

== Notes ==
Government offices
Preceded by Simon Bradstreet as Governor of Massachusetts Bay Colony	President of the Council of New England; 25 May 1686 – 20 December 1686	Succeeded by Sir Edmund Andros as Governor of the Dominion of New England
Preceded by Massachusetts Governor's Council (acting)	Governor of the Province of Massachusetts Bay; 11 June 1702 – 4 February 1715	Succeeded by Massachusetts Governor's Council (acting)
Preceded by Massachusetts Governor's Council (acting)	Governor of the Province of Massachusetts Bay; 21 March 1715 – 9 November 1715	Succeeded by William Tailer (acting)
Preceded by Samuel Allen	Governor of the Province of New Hampshire; 1 April 1702 – 7 October 1716	Succeeded by Samuel Shute
Parliament of England
Preceded by James Worsley	Member of Parliament for Newtown, Isle of Wight; 1701–1702; With: Thomas Hopsonn 1698–1702	Succeeded by John Leigh
