= Charles Lodwik =

Mayor of New York City from 1694 to 1695

22nd Mayor of New York City
- In office 1694–1695
- Preceded by: Abraham de Peyster
- Succeeded by: William Merritt

Personal details
- Born: 1658 Hackney, Middlesex, England
- Died: 1723 (aged 64–65) London, England

Charles Lodwik (1658 – 1723), surname also spelled Lodwick, Lodwyck, Lodewick and Lodowick, was an English and colonial American militia captain and merchant who served as the 22nd Mayor of New York City from 1694 to 1695.

== Militia career and mayoralty ==
The New York City militia consisted of six trained bands and Lodwik served as the captain of one. Martha J. Lamb wrote that he was "an old-time Whig of the deepest dye", "a man of irreproachable character", and "of no mean ability".

Lodwik supported Jacob Leisler in Leisler's Rebellion and presented the petition with Leisler in 1689. Lodwik was not charged despite being an apparent ringleader of the initial militia action. Five years later, he was elected Mayor of New York City.

== Personal life ==
Lodwik's uncle was Francis Lodwick, a pioneer of a priori languages. Lodwik attended the marriage of the English writer Daniel Defoe, an acquaintance of Lodwick, as a witness.

== Legacy ==
In 1937, Lodwik was added into the official list of Mayors of New York City as the 21st, serving as a precedent for the insertion of Matthias Nicoll's second term. This made Zohran Mamdani, elected in 2025, the 112th Mayor instead of the 111th.

== See also ==
- List of mayors of New York City

== Bibliography ==
- McCormick, C. H. (1989). Leisler's Rebellion. Outstanding Studies in Early American History. New York: Garland. ISBN 0-824-06190-X.
