= William Atwood =

English lawyer (d. 1712)

William Atwood (c. 1650 – 1712) was an English lawyer, known also as a political and historical writer.

== Early life ==
William Atwood was son and heir of John Atwood of Broomfield, Essex. He studied at Queens' College, Cambridge, before being admitted to the Inner Temple in 1669 and Gray's Inn in 1670, and becoming a barrister in 1674.

He acted for the defence for Henry Booth, Lord Delamere at his treason trial in 1685-6. Booth was accused of participation in Monmouth's Rebellion, and the judge in the case was Judge Jeffreys, as Lord High Steward. The defence secured an acquittal.

== In New York ==
He became Chief Justice of New York in 1701; in 1697 the Privy Council in London had moved to set up colonial vice-admiralty courts, able to act quickly in matters of piracy (a live matter in New York at the time), and wrecks. He was removed a year later, by Lord Cornbury, on a corruption charge.

Atwood's position was in fact made very difficult by the governors and the factional politics of New York, after the death of Jacob Leisler. Atwood had presided at the treason trial of mayor Nicholas Bayard (c.1644–1707) of the anti-Leislerian party, at the time of governor Richard Coote, 1st Earl of Bellomont. Bellomont was both a major sponsor of William Kidd, charged with piracy, and a Leislerian. When Bellomont died in 1701, the change of governor when Cornbury took over meant a complete about-turn for the local factions, and undermined Atwood's position.

In the aftermath, Atwood tried to justify himself, but with little success. His later attack on the poet Matthew Prior, in A Modern Inscription to the Duke of Marlborough's Fame, was not only a Whig taking issue with a Tory, but had a peripheral connection with the business of his removal as Justice. Prior was a Commissioner for Trade and Plantations, and this Commission had upheld Cornbury's action.

== Writing ==
His Fundamental Constitution of the English Government (1690) argued that Parliament could act to fill a vacancy in the monarchy. In it he also objected to John Locke's theory, that such a vacancy, which had occurred in 1689, was subject to popular sovereignty. It is regarded as a clarifying statement of the moderate Whig position on the political settlement after the Glorious Revolution.

He wrote also on Scotland, causing the Scottish Parliament to order his works to be burned, by the common hangman: the objectionable The Superiority and Direct Dominion of the Imperial Crown of England (1704), and The Scots Patriot Unmasked. The sentence was carried out in August 1705 at the Market Cross in Edinburgh, a month after James Drake's Historia Anglo-Scotica suffered the same fate. The well-paid James Anderson answered Atwood's case against Scottish independence, in 1705. Atwood replied with The Superiority and Direct Dominion of the Imperial Crown of England ... Reasserted (1705). Atwood was also answered by James Dalrymple, who argued that the Scottish church had always been independent.
