= Albany Convention =

The Albany Convention was an independent governing body led by local civil and military officials centred on Albany, New York, during Leisler's Rebellion.

When news of the Glorious Revolution reached the Province of New York in 1689, Jacob Leisler, a militia captain and prominent merchant, led a rebellion in which he appointed himself ruler of the Province of New York. Albany was the only center which resisted Leisler's claims to leadership. Under the leadership of Peter Schuyler and Robert Livingston, the Albany Convention was formed to uphold loyalty to the new Protestant rulers of England, William III and Mary II, while maintaining control over the region's affairs. Leisler's year-long attempt to subdue the Albany Convention led to a number of military engagements.
