= Jacob Milborne =

Attorney General of New York (c. 1648–1691)

Attorney General of New York
- In office 1690–1691
- Preceded by: James Graham
- Succeeded by: Thomas Newton

Personal details
- Born: c. 1648 Putney, Surrey, Kingdom of England
- Died: 16 May 1691 (aged 42–43) New York City, Province of New York, British America
- Cause of death: Execution
- Spouse: Mary Leisler (m. 1691)

Jacob Milborne (sometimes Milburn) (c. 1648 – 16 May 1691) was an American clerk living in the Province of New York who was an ally, secretary and son-in-law of the rebel Jacob Leisler, served briefly as Attorney General of the province, and was executed for his part in Leisler's Rebellion.

== Early life ==
Milborne, a member of a radical family of English dissenters, was a son of Rev. Luke Milborne, one of the thirteen "Fanatiks of East Sheen" (along with former Lord Mayor of London, John Ireton). His brother, William Milborne, was a notorious "Fifth Monarchist" (an extreme Puritan sect) Bermuda Councilor.

On 12 March 1686, his then father-in-law, Samuel Edsall conveyed to Milborne, the easterly part of the remainder of the original 1,872-acre tract, which fronted the Hudson River.

== Career ==
Between 1686 and 1689, Milborne worked as a clerk and bookkeeper for a leading New York merchant overseeing business operations from Rotterdam, where he was associated with New Yorkers who were later prominent in the rebellion, including Benjamin Blagge (his brother-in-law), Jacob Mauritz (half-brother of mayor Cornelis Steenwijck), and Joost Stol (likely a son of author Barent Joosten Stol). In February 1689, Samuel Edsall (founder of English Neighborhood), joined him in Rotterdam, before Edsall returned to New York three months later to lead a rebellion there.

As a fervent Puritan, his religious and political views brought him into conflict with Edmund Andros, the governor of the Province of New York, who fined and gaoled him. Milborne returned to England and successfully sued the Governor for false imprisonment.

=== Association with Jacob Leisler ===
He formed a close association with Jacob Leisler, a rich German-born businessman of rabidly anti-Catholic, staunchly Calvinist views and the leader of a populist political faction known as Leislerians. When Governor Andros, now governor of the unpopular New England Dominion, was imprisoned in Boston in 1689 for maladministration, the Leislerians took possession of Fort James in south Manhattan. The lieutenant governor left for England and some members of the provincial council fled to Albany. With Leisler now the de facto governor of the province, Milborne was appointed clerk to the council, attorney general and advocate general, as well as being Leisler's secretary and, from 1691, his son-in-law.

Leisler and Milborne instituted a highly autocratic regime under which property was confiscated, mail was opened, homes searched and people were jailed without warrant or trial, and anyone who criticized them was accused of being secretly Catholic or "popishly affected." Wanting to strike a blow at Catholic France, they mounted an unsuccessful invasion of Canada. It was a strange regime in that its proclaimed purposes were (a) to prevent a Catholic takeover, yet there was no real threat of this given how few Catholics were in New York at the time, and (b) to hold power for the new Protestant king and queen of England, William of Orange and his wife Mary, pending their consolidation of power and sending of instructions and representatives to the colony, yet when the new king and queen sent troops and a new governor, Leisler and Milborne were initially resistant to accepting them.

=== Execution ===
When a new governor Henry Sloughter arrived with the resources to put down the rebellion, Leisler and Milborne surrendered to him, but not before shots were fired and lives were lost in a standoff at the fort. They were arrested and tried for murder and treason by a somewhat biased bench. Originally sentenced to be hanged, drawn and quartered and their estates forfeited to the crown, the two men were in the event simply hanged (hanged, but then cut down prior to death and then beheaded in front of a large crowd).

== Personal life ==
Milborne was first married to a daughter of Samuel Edsall. On 3 February 1691, the widower Milborne was married to Mary Leisler (1669–1747), a daughter of Jacob Leisler.

After his death, his widow married Abraham Gouverneur, a Recorder of New York City and Speaker of the New York General Assembly. In 1698, largely thanks to the sympathetic efforts of the then governor, Earl of Bellomont, the bodies of the two men were disinterred and reburied at the Dutch church and their estates were later restored to their heirs.
