= Lachine massacre =

1689 battle of King William's War

Coordinates: 45°25′53″N 73°40′32″W

- Part of King William's War
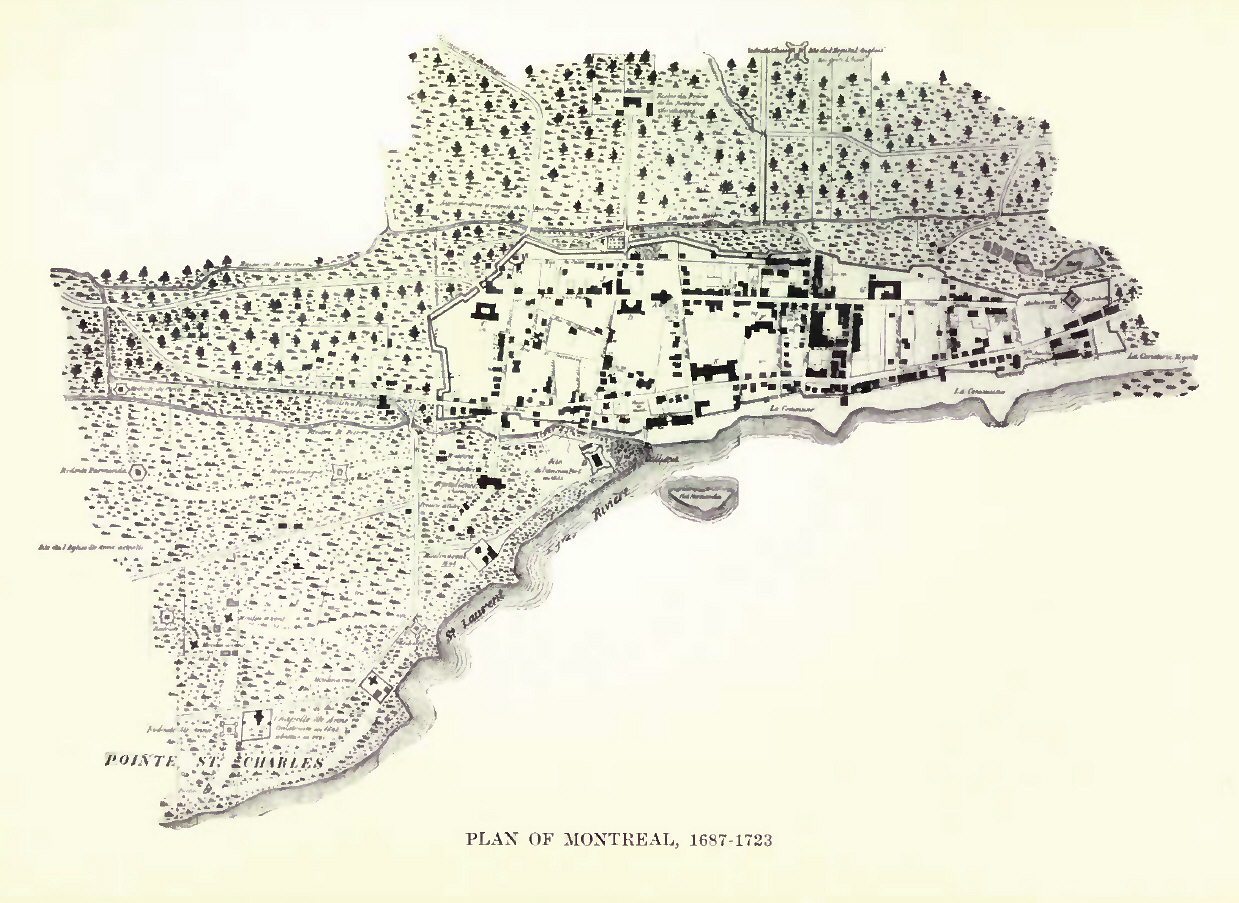
- Map of Montreal, 1687 to 1723. The Lachine settlement was located southwest of Montreal proper.
Date	5 August 1689
Location	Lachine, New France
Result	Mohawk victory

Belligerents
Mohawk	New France

Strength
1,500 Natives	375 regulars and settlers

Casualties and losses
3 killed	24 killed

The Lachine massacre, part of the Beaver Wars, occurred when 1,500 Mohawk warriors launched a surprise attack against the small (375 inhabitants) settlement of Lachine, New France, at the upper end of Montreal Island, on the morning of 5 August 1689.

The attack was precipitated by the growing Haudenosaunee (Iroquois) frustration with the increased French incursions into their territory and the ongoing concern about French Marquis de Denonville's attack of 1687, and it was encouraged by the settlers of New England as a way to leverage power against New France during King William's War.

In their attack, the Mohawk warriors destroyed a substantial portion of the Lachine settlement by fire and captured numerous inhabitants, killing around 24.

== Background ==
The Mohawk people and other Haudenosaunee tribes attacked the French and their indigenous allies for a variety of reasons related to both economic and cultural circumstances. European settlers in the American Northeast developed a fur trade with the Indigenous, including the Haudenosaunee, and beaver furs were most desired. During the 17th century, French encroachments as part of the Beaver Wars contributed to an erosion of Franco-Indian relations. The French mission to assimilate natives required the abandonment of native traditions, which was met with resistance. By 1667, large numbers of Wendat (Huron) and Haudenosaunee, especially Mohawks, started arriving at the St Lawrence Valley and its mission villages to escape the effects of warfare. Many traditionalists, including some Mohawks, resented the Jesuits for destroying traditional native society but could not do anything to stop them. Traditionalists reluctantly accepted the establishment of a mission to have good relations with the French, whom they needed for trade. That cultural invasion increased tensions between the two factions.

The relationship between the French and the Haudenosaunee had been strained long before King Philip's War, as the French maintained relations with other tribes as well for both trade and war alliances, such as the Abenaki. In 1679, after the end of the Haudenosaunee war with the Susquehannock and the Mahican, the Haudenosaunee raided native villages in the West. Pushing out Siouan and Algonquian tribes to the west, they claimed hunting grounds in the Ohio Valley by the right of conquest. They were kept empty of inhabitants to encourage hunting. As a result, the Haudenosaunee regularly raided trading parties in the western frontier, which was under French protection, and took loot from them. After a military confrontation in 1684, the Haudenosaunee negotiated a peace treaty with French governor Antoine Lefèbvre de La Barre, but it stated the Haudenosaunee were free to attack the western Indians. The French objected to the treaty and replaced La Barre with the Marquis de Denonville. He was less sympathetic to native relations and did not pay attention to the Haudenosaunee-Algonquian tensions. The Haudenosaunee attacked the French partly because they were not willing to accept constraints against their warfare related to traditional Haudenosaunee enemies.

"Mourning wars" were also an important cultural factor in native warfare. Natives fought war to "avenge perceived wrongs committed by one people against another." They were also a means to replace the dead within a native community. In wartime, natives would capture members of another group and adopt them to rebuild their society. When new diseases such as smallpox killed large numbers of native people within their communities, survivors were motivated to warfare to take captives to rebuild. What the Haudenosaunee wanted was not war but a better share of the fur trade. To serve as punishment for attacks on French fur fleets, New France ordered two expeditions under Courcelles and Tracy into Mohawk territory in 1666. The expeditions burned villages and destroyed much of the Mohawk winter corn supply. In addition, Denonville's 1687 invasion of the Seneca nation country destroyed approximately 1,200,000 bushels of corn and crippled the Haudenosaunee economy. That kind of aggression served as fuel for the Haudenosaunee' retaliation that would come. After two decades of uneasy peace, England and France declared war against each other in 1689. Despite the 1686 Treaty of Whitehall in which both France and England agreed that European conflicts would not disrupt colonial peace and neutrality, the war was fought primarily by proxy between New France and the New England Colonies. English colonists in the Province of New York encouraged the Haudenosaunee to attack New France's undefended settlements. While English settlers were preparing to carry out raids against French targets, the settlers of New France were ill-prepared to defend against Indian attacks because of the isolation of their farms and villages. Denonville was quoted as saying, "If we have a war, nothing can save the country but a miracle of God."

== Attack ==
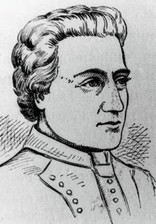
Daniel d'Auger de Subercase

On the rainy morning of 5 August 1689, Haudenosaunee warriors launched a surprise nighttime raid on the undefended settlement of Lachine. They traveled up the Saint Lawrence River by boat, crossed Lake Saint-Louis, and landed on the south shore of the Island of Montreal. While the colonists slept, the invaders surrounded their homes and waited for their leader to signal when the attack should begin. They attacked the homes, broke down doors and windows, and dragged the colonists outside, where many were killed. When some of the colonists barricaded themselves within the village's structures, the attackers set fire to the buildings and waited for the settlers to flee the flames.

According to a 1992 article, the Haudenosaunee, wielding weapons such as the tomahawk, killed 24 French and took more than 70 prisoners. Justin Winsor in Narrative and Critical History of America (1884) stated that "it is estimated that more than two hundred persons were butchered outright, and one hundred and twenty were carried off as prisoners." Other sources, such as Encyclopædia Britannica, claim that 250 settlers and soldiers lost their lives during the massacre. In line with Haudenosaunee tradition, prisoners would have been tortured and cannibalism of some prisoners would have taken place. It is claimed that the Haudenosaunee wanted to avenge the 1,200,000 bushels of corn burned by the French, but since they were unable to reach the food stores in Montreal, they kidnapped and killed the Lachine crop producers instead. Lachine was the main departure point for westward-traveling fur traders, a fact that may have provided extra motivation for the Mohawk attack, though the simple exposure of Lachine at the upper end of Montreal island was likely more a factor.

== Aftermath ==
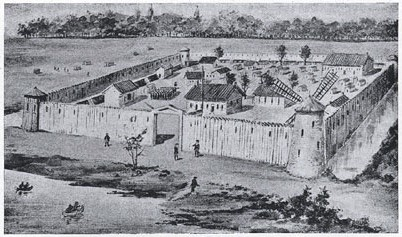
Fort Rémy, also known as Fort Lachine.

Word of the attack spread when one of the Lachine survivors reached a local garrison three miles (4.8 km) away and notified the soldiers of the events. In response to the attack, the French mobilized 200 soldiers under the command of Daniel d'Auger de Subercase, along with 100 armed civilians and some soldiers from nearby Forts Rémy, Rolland, and de La Présentation to march against the Haudenosaunee. They defended some of the fleeing colonists from their Mohawk pursuers, but just prior to reaching Lachine, the armed forces were recalled to Fort Rolland by the order of Governor Denonville, who was trying to pacify the local Haudenosaunee inhabitants. He had 700 soldiers at his disposal within the Montreal barracks and might have overtaken the Haudenosaunee forces but decided to follow a diplomatic route.

Numerous attacks from both sides followed, but none was fatal, and the two groups quickly realized the futility of their attempts to drive the other out. In February 1690, the French began peace negotiations with the Haudenosaunee. The French returned captured natives in exchange for the beginnings of peace talks. Throughout the 1690s, there were no major French or native raids, and even against the will of the English, peace talks continued. The time of relative peace eventually led to the Montreal Treaty of 1701 by which the Haudenosaunee promised to remain neutral in case of war between the French and the English.

Following the events at Lachine, Denonville was recalled to France for matters unrelated to the massacre, and Louis de Buade de Frontenac took over governorship of Montreal in October. Frontenac launched raids of vengeance against the English colonists to the south "in Canadien style" by attacking during the winter months of 1690 such as the Schenectady massacre.

== Historical accounts ==
According to the historian Jean-Francois Lozier, the factors influencing the course of war and peace throughout the region of New-France were not exclusive to the relations between the French and Haudenosaunee or to those between the French and English crowns. A number of factors provide the context for the Lachine Massacre.

Sources of information regarding the victims of the Haudenosaunee in New France are the writings of Jesuit priests; the state registry of parishes in Quebec, Trois-Rivieres, and Montreal; letters written by Marie Guyart (French: Marie de l'Incarnation); and the writings of Samuel Champlain. The accuracy of those sources and reports varies. For instance, in the town of Trois-Rivieres, approximately one third of deaths attributed to the Haudenosaunee lack names. According to Canadian historian John A. Dickinson, although the cruelty of the Haudenosaunee was real, their threat was neither as constant nor terrible as the contemporary sources represented although the residents felt under siege.

European accounts of the Lachine massacre come from two primary sources: survivors of the attack, and Catholic missionaries in the area. Initial reports inflated the Lachine death toll significantly. Colby arrived at the total number of dead, 24, by examining Catholic parish registers before and after the attack. French Catholic accounts of the attack were recorded. François Vachon de Belmont, the fifth superior of the Sulpicians of Montreal, wrote in his History of Canada:

After this total victory, the unhappy band of prisoners was subjected to all the rage which the cruellest vengeance could inspire in these savages. They were taken to the far side of Lake St. Louis by the victorious army, which shouted ninety times while crossing to indicate the number of prisoners or scalps they had taken, saying, we have been tricked, Ononthio, we will trick you as well. Once they had landed, they lit fires, planted stakes in the ground, burned five Frenchmen, roasted six children, and grilled some others on the coals and ate them.

Surviving prisoners of the Lachine massacre reported that 48 of their colleagues were tortured, burned, and eaten shortly after capture. Further, many survivors showed evidence of ritual torture and recounted their experiences. After the attack, the French colonists retrieved several firearms that English colonists had given to the Haudenosaunee, all of which the Mohawk had left behind during their retreat from the island. Evidence of the English arming the Mohawk incited a longstanding hostility towards the colonists of New York as well as demands for revenge among the French. Haudenosaunee accounts of the attack have not been recovered, as they were recounted in oral histories. French sources reported that only three of the attackers were killed.

Because all of the written accounts of the attack were by the French victims, their reports of cannibalism and parents forced to throw their children onto burning fires may be exaggerated or apocryphal, or in the other hand may be given additional weight and credibility. The Mohawk and the Haudenosaunee have used ritual torture after warfare, sometimes to honour the bravery of enemy warriors, as was then common practice among native tribes.

== See also ==
- List of massacres in Canada
- History of Montreal
- List of Indian massacres

== Sources ==
- Borthwick, John Douglas (1892). History and Biographical Gazetteer of Montreal to the Year 1892. Montreal: John Lovell. – Also History and Biographical Gazetteer of Montreal to the Year 1892 at Google Books
- Campbell, T.J. (1915). Pioneer Laymen of North America. Vol. II. New York: The America Press. – Also Pioneer Laymen of North America at Google Books
- Colby, Charles W. (1914). Wrong, George M.; Langton, H. H. (eds.). The Fighting Governor: A Chronicle of Frontenac. Chronicles of Canada. Vol. 7. Toronto: Glasgow, Brook & Company. ISBN 9780722267066. – Also The Fighting Governor at Project Gutenberg
- Daugherty, W.E. (January 1983). "The Colonial Struggle for Acadia, The Initial Phase: 1686–1713" (PDF). Maritime Indian Treaties In Historical Perspective (Report). Department of Indian and Northern Affairs.
- Dickinson, John (June 1982). "La guerre iroquoise et la mortalité en Nouvelle-France, 1608–1666" [The Iroquois War and Mortality in New France, 1608–1666] (PDF). fr:Revue d'histoire de l'Amérique française (in French). 36 (1).
- Lozier, Jean-François (Fall 2007). "Review of: Native American Weapons by Colin Taylor". Material Culture. 39 (2): 82–84. JSTOR 29764420.
- Lozier, Jean-François (2012). In Each Other's Arms: France and the St. Lawrence Mission Villages in War and Peace, 1630–1730 (PhD Thesis). University of Toronto. hdl:1807/36291. S2CID 129483904.
- Lyons, Chuck (Winter 2007). "France's Fateful Strike Against the Iroquois". Military History Quarterly.
- Richter, Daniel K. (1992). The Ordeal of the Longhouse: The Peoples of the Iroquois League in the Era of European Colonization. UNC Press Books. ISBN 978-0-8078-6791-4. JSTOR 10.5149/9780807867914_richter.
- Roberts, Charles G.D. (1897). A History of Canada. Toronto: George M. Morang. – Also A History of Canada at Google Books
- Rushforth, Brett (2012). Bonds of Alliance: Indigenous and Atlantic Slaveries in New France. University of North Carolina Press. ISBN 978-0-8078-3558-6.
- Wallace, Paul A. W. (January 1956). "The Iroquois: A Brief Outline of their History". Pennsylvania History. 23 (1): 15–28. JSTOR 27769640.
- Winsor, Justin, ed. (1884). Narrative and Critical History of America. Boston: Houghton, Mifflin and Company. – Also Narrative and Critical History of America at Google Books and Narrative and Critical History of America at Project Gutenberg
- "The Lachine massacre". Canada: A People's History. Canadian Broadcasting Corporation. 31 October 2000.
