= Nicholas Bayard =

Mayor of New York City from 1685-1686

17th Mayor of New York City
- In office 1685–1686
- Preceded by: Gabriel Minvielle
- Succeeded by: Stephanus Van Cortlandt

Personal details
- Born: 1644 Alphen, Holland, United Provinces of the Netherlands
- Died: 1707 or 1709 New York, New York, British America
- Spouse: Judith Varleth (after 1666)
- Relations: Peter Stuyvesant (uncle); Stephen Bayard (grandson)
- Children: 1

Nicholas Bayard (c. 1644–1707 or 1709) was a government official and slave trader in colonial New York. Bayard served as the mayor of New York City from 1685 to 1686. He is historically most notable for being Peter Stuyvesant's nephew and for being a prominent member of the Bayard family, which remained prominent in New York City history into the 20th century.

== Early life ==
Bayard was born in Alphen, Holland, the son of a Huguenot refugee. His parents were Samuel Bayard (c. 1615–c. 1647) and Ann Stuyvesant (1613–1683), the sister of Governor Petrus Stuyvesant.

In May 1647, he accompanied his widowed mother to America. Three other children, Balthazar (who married Maria Lockerman in 1664), Petrus (who married Blandina Kierstede in 1674) and Catharine (who married William De Meyer), also arrived in New Amsterdam. His Aunt Judith Bayard (c. 1615–1687), the sister of Samuel Bayard, married Director General Stuyvesant, and thus there was a double relationship between the families.

== Career ==
In 1664, Stuyvesant, whose patronage supported Bayard's career, appointed him clerk of the Common Council, and soon afterward became private secretary to Stuyvesant and received the additional appointment of surveyor of the province. After the re-conquest of New York by the Dutch in 1672, Bayard became secretary of the province. Under the second English regime, in 1685, when Thomas Dongan, 2nd Earl of Limerick, was governor, Bayard was mayor of New York; prior to 1680, New York mayors served one-year terms but thereafter they served two-year terms, with few exceptions. Bayard was one of the exceptions and served only one year. As a member of the governor's council, Bayard drew up the Dongan Charter that was granted in 1686.

In 1688, he received, at the head of the regiment of militia of which he was colonel, the restored but cordially detested Governor Edmund Andros. As one of the three resident members of the governor's council, and commander-in-chief of the militia of the province, he was the object of popular hatred during Leisler's Rebellion, and fled to Albany to escape assassination. Returning to attend an only son on his sickbed, he was arrested and briefly imprisoned. He was released upon the arrival of the new governor, Henry Sloughter, who put down the rebellion and sat on the Common Council.

A Narrative of an Attempt made by the French of Canada upon the Mohaque's Country, by Colonel Bayard and his friend Lieut.-Colonel Charles Lodowick was published in London in 1693.

Bayard was a slaveholder and owner of slave ships throughout much of his adult life. According to Alan J. Singer, he

was the mayor of New York City under the English from 1685 to 1686 and a nephew of Dutch colonial superintendent Peter Stuyvesant, the largest private slaveholder in the Dutch colony.

Samuel was a member of the colonial assembly and related through marriage to the prominent slaveholding Van Cortlandt, Van Rensselaer, and Schuyler families. Nicholas and then Samuel owned and operated sugar mills processing slave-produced commodities in the city. The Bayards' owned stakes in at least eight slave-trading ships. There are Bayard Streets in lower Manhattan, Brooklyn, and Staten Island, and in the Westchester County towns of New Rochelle and Larchmont. Aside from his sizeable farm in the "Out Ward" of New York, Bayard received a license from the notoriously corrupt Governor Benjamin Fletcher in 1694 to buy 4,000 acres along the Schoharie Creek from the Indians, for some £100. When Fletcher chartered his staunch ally's purchase in 1695, the original 4,000 acres became a tract forty miles long and thirty miles broad on both sides of the Schoharie Creek, some 768,000 acres, the Manor of Kingsfield. The Indians were unhappy and repudiated the deal. They found an ally in Governor Bellomont, who replaced Fletcher in 1697 and revoked some of Fletcher's most outrageous land grants, including Bayard's. Colonel Bayard did not relinquish his claim on these lands and went to London to clear his title before the Lords of Trade.

Accused in 1702 of high treason before Chief Justice William Atwood, on the basis of a remonstrance signed by him and others, as libelous, he was sentenced to death; but after the death of the New York governor and the removal of Atwood on a corruption charge, the proceedings were annulled by an order in council, and he was reinstated in his property and honors.

== Personal life ==
Coat of Arms of Nicholas Bayard

On 23 May 1666, he married Judith Verlet or Varleth, daughter of Casper Varleth whose brother Nicholas Varleth was Ambassador to Virginia from New Amsterdam. Together, they were the parents of:

- Samuel Bayard (1669–1746), a member of the Colonial Assembly who married Margaretta Van Cortlandt (b. 1674), daughter of Stephen Van Cortlandt and his wife, Gertruj Schuyler, daughter of Philip Pieterse Schuyler, and established the Bayard family in colonial New York, on 12 March 1696.

=== The Bayard Farm ===
Many historic buildings in SoHo and elsewhere in lower Manhattan stand on land formerly belonging to his Bayard Farm. This includes Sullivan Street.

The old Bayard house, erected in 1751 by a later Nicholas Bayard, stood on the west side of The Bowery near present-day Broome Street, in a farm originally of some two hundred acres; the house and its house-lot were purchased in 1798, and converted by a Frenchman named Delacroix into a new site for his popular resort, known as "Vauxhall Gardens." The only other residences within sight in pre-Revolutionary days were the Robert De Lancey mansion, on the east side of the Bowery, and Peter Stuyvesant's seat to the north. Not far distant rose "Bayard's Mount", fortified as "Bunker's Hill" in the early stage of the American Revolution.

=== Descendants ===
Through his son Samuel, he was the grandfather of:

- Nicholas Bayard, who married Elizabeth Rynders (b. 1673), granddaughter of Jacob Leisler, on July 3, 1729;
- Gertrude Bayard, who married Peter Kemble (1704-1789), a prominent New Jersey businessman and politician; and
- Stephen Bayard, who married Alida Vetch, and served as the 39th Mayor of New York City.

He was the great-grandfather of:

- Nicholas Bayard (b. 1736), who married Catharine Livingston (1743–1775), daughter of Peter Van Brugh Livingston (1710–1792) and Mary Alexander, on April 20, 1762 and
- Judith Bayard, who married Jeremiah Van Rensselaer (1738–1810), son of Johannes Van Rensselaer (1708–1793) and Engeltie "Angelica" Livingston (1698–1746/47) in 1760.
