= William Merritt (mayor) =

Mayor of New York City from 1695 to 1698

23rd Mayor of New York City
- In office 1695–1698
- Preceded by: Charles Lodwik
- Succeeded by: Johannes de Peyster

Personal details
- Born: Circa. 1640 England
- Died: 1708

William Merritt (died 1708) was the 23rd Mayor of New York City. He served from 1695 to 1698.
