= Leisler's Rebellion =

Uprising in late-17th century colonial New York

- Part of the Glorious Revolution
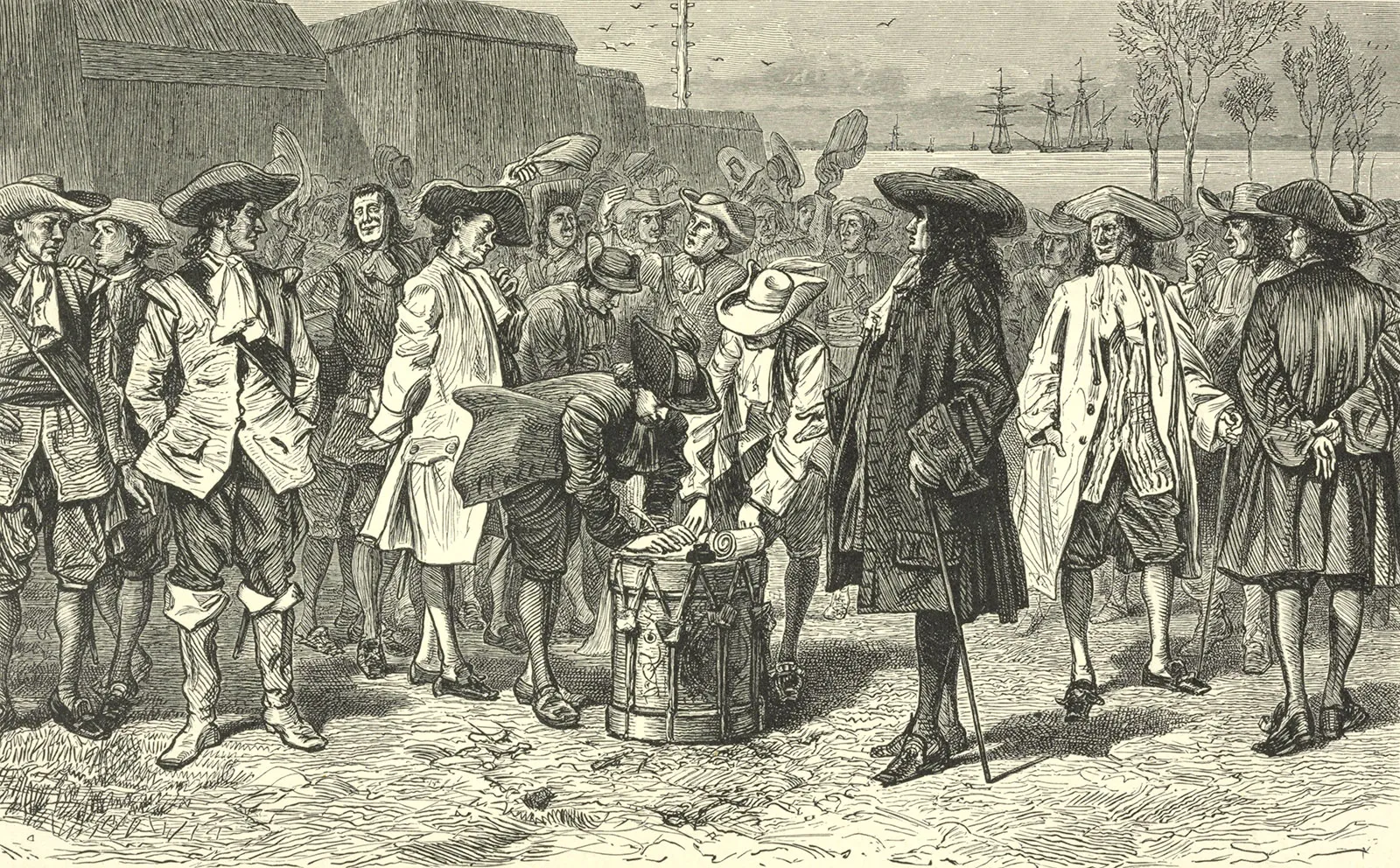
- Engraving of militiamen signing Leisler's declaration
- Date: May 31, 1689 – March 21, 1691
- Location: Province of New York
- Result: Lieutenant Governor Francis Nicholson leaves for England; Leisler takes effective control of the provincial government; Henry Sloughter, who was commissioned governor by King William, removes and executes Leisler; Dissolution of the Dominion of New England in 1689.

Parties
Leislerians	Anti-Leislerians; Dominion of New England

Lead figures
Jacob Leisler (executed); Jacob Milborne (executed); Charles Lodwik; Jost Stoll	Francis Nicholson; Nicholas Bayard; Stephanus Van Cortlandt; Frederick Philipse; Henry Sloughter; Richard Ingoldesby

Leisler's Rebellion was an uprising in late-17th century colonial New York in which German American merchant and militia captain Jacob Leisler seized control of the southern portion of the colony and ruled it from 1689 to 1691. The uprising took place in the aftermath of England's Glorious Revolution and the 1689 Boston revolt in the Dominion of New England, which had included New York. The rebellion reflected colonial resentment against the policies of the deposed King James II.

Royal authority was not restored until 1691, when English troops and a new governor were sent to New York. Leisler was arrested by these forces, who tried and convicted him of treason. He was executed, with the revolt leaving the colony polarized, bitterly split into two rival factions, pro-Leislerites, who regarded him as a martyr, and who aligned generally with the British Whig party, and antis, who aligned generally with the British Tories.

== Background ==
In 1664, English forces took control of New Netherland. King Charles II gave the territory as proprietor to his brother James, then Duke of York, to rule as he pleased. James partitioned East and West Jersey to other proprietors and established an essentially autocratic government with a strong governor and council but no elected legislature. In 1685, James succeeded his brother to the throne. In 1686, he established the Dominion of New England, centralizing the administration of previously separate colonies. In May 1688, he added New York and the Jerseys to the dominion. Its governor Sir Edmund Andros came to New York that summer to establish his authority and install Francis Nicholson, a captain in the English Army, to administer those colonies as his lieutenant governor. Nicholson was assisted by a local council but no legislative assembly. He was seen by many New Yorkers as the next in a line of royal governors who "had in a most arbitrary way subverted our ancient privileges". Nicholson justified his actions by stating that the colonists were "a conquered people, and therefore ... could not so much [as] claim rights and priviledges as Englishmen".

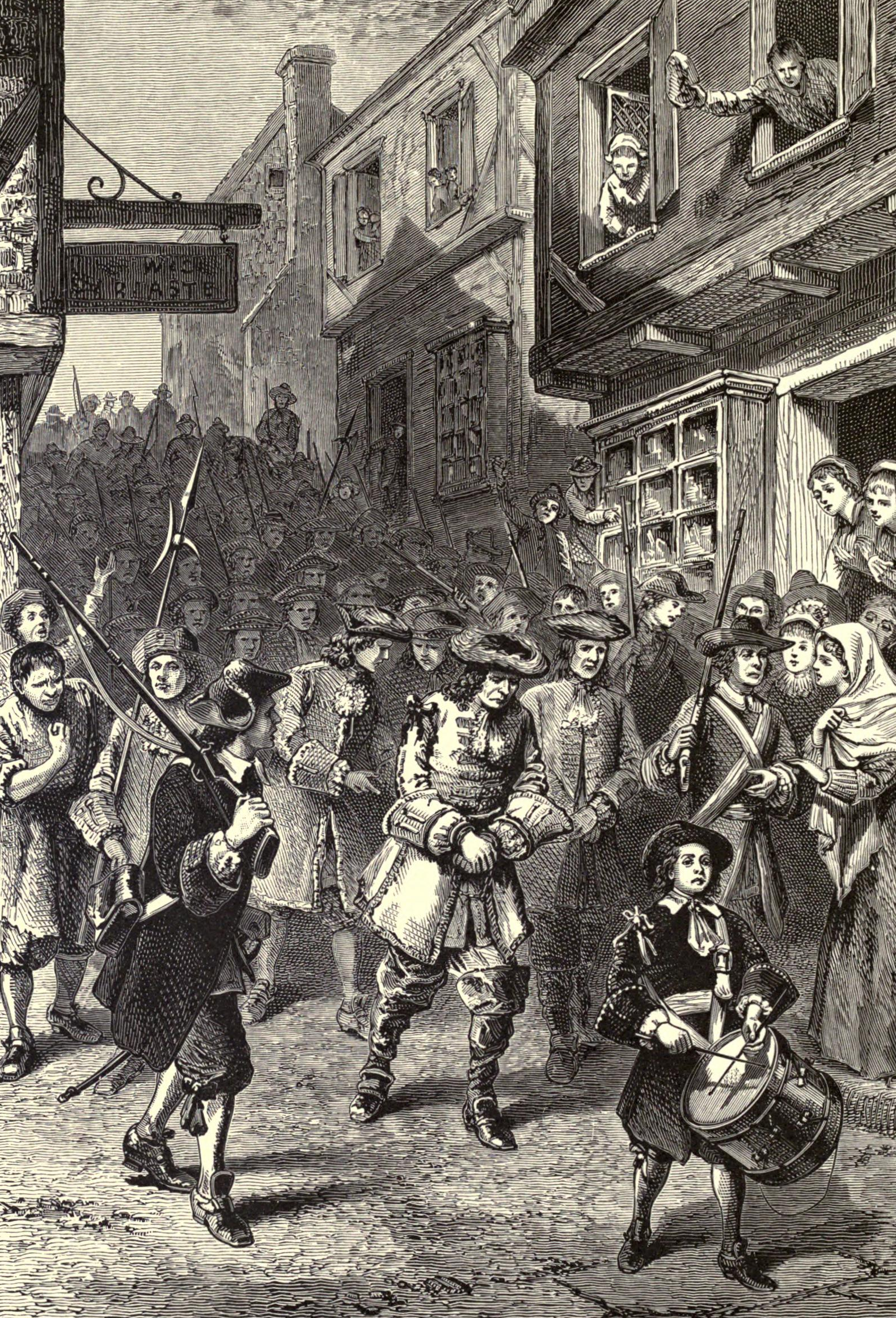
Edmund Andros' arrest during the 1689 Boston revolt

In November 1688, the Glorious Revolution deposed the Catholic James and replaced him with the Protestant William III and Mary II. The rule of Andros was highly unpopular, especially in New England, and his opponents in Massachusetts used the change of royal power for their political benefit by organizing an uprising. On April 18, 1689, a mob formed in Boston led by former Massachusetts political figures, and they arrested Andros and other dominion officials. This led to a cascade of events in which Massachusetts and the other New England colonies rapidly restored their pre-dominion governments.

== Rising tensions ==
Lieutenant Governor Nicholson learned of the uprising in Boston by April 26. He took no steps to announce news of it or of the political upheaval in England for fear of raising prospects of rebellion in New York. Politicians and militia leaders became more assertive on Long Island when they learned of Boston, and dominion officials were ousted from a number of communities by mid-May.

At the same time, Nicholson learned that France had declared war on England, bringing the threat of Franco-Indian attacks on New York's northern frontier. He was also short of troops, since most of the New York garrison had been sent by Andros to deal with Indian activity in Maine. He found that his regulars had also been swayed by populists into believing that he was attempting to impose Catholic rule on New York. He attempted to mollify panicked citizenry over rumored Indian raids by inviting the militia to join the army garrison at Fort James on Manhattan island.

New York's defenses were in poor condition, and Nicholson's council voted to impose import duties to improve them. This action was met with immediate resistance, with a number of merchants refusing to pay the duty. One in particular was Jacob Leisler, a German-born Calvinist merchant and militia captain. Leisler was a vocal opponent of the dominion regime, which he saw as an attempt to impose popery on the province, and he may have played a role in subverting Nicholson's regulars.

On May 22, Nicholson's council was petitioned by the militia, who sought more rapid improvement to the city's defenses and also wanted access to the powder magazine in the fort. This latter request was denied, heightening concerns that the city had inadequate powder supplies. This concern was further exacerbated when city leaders began hunting through the city for additional supplies.

== Rebellion ==
Nicholson made an intemperate remark to a militia officer on May 30, 1689, and the incident flared into open rebellion. Nicholson was well known for his temper, and he told the officer, "I rather would see the Towne on fire than to be commanded by you". Rumors flew around the town that Nicholson was prepared to burn it down. He summoned the officer and demanded that he surrender his commission. Abraham de Peyster was the officer's commander and one of the wealthiest men in the city, and he engaged in a heated argument with Nicholson, after which de Peyster and his brother Johannis, also a militia captain, stormed out of the council chamber.

The militia was called out and descended en masse to Fort James, which they occupied. An officer was sent to the council to demand the keys to the powder magazine, which Nicholson eventually surrendered to "hinder and prevent bloodshed and further mischiefe". The following day, a council of militia officers called on Jacob Leisler to take command of the city militia. He did so, and the rebels issued a declaration that they would hold the fort on behalf of the new monarchs until they sent a properly accredited governor.

Leisler's exact role in the militia uprising is unknown, but a number of observations point to his involvement. He and militia captain Charles Lodwik presented the petition on May 22. Jost Stoll, one of his officers, led the militia to the gates of Fort James, and another of his officers delivered the demand for the keys to the powder magazine. However, none of the depositions which Nicholson collected prior to his departure directly implicates Leisler as a ringleader.

=== Leisler takes control ===
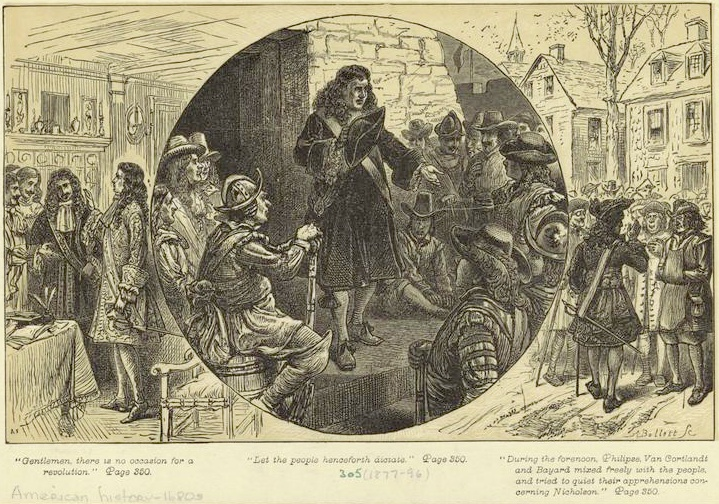
Nineteenth-century engraving depicting Nicholson's councilors trying to quiet the rebellion

At this point, the militia controlled the fort, which gave them control over the harbor. When ships arrived in the harbor, they brought passengers and captains directly to the fort, cutting off outside communications to Nicholson and his council. On June 6, Nicholson decided to leave for England and began gathering depositions for use in proceedings there. He left the city on June 10 for the Jersey shore where he hoped to join Thomas Dongan, who was expected to sail for England soon thereafter.

Leisler's control of the province was limited at first. His councilors were Dutch patroons Nicholas Bayard, Stephanus van Cortlandt, and Frederick Philipse, and they were still in the city. They did not recognize his authority, nor did the city's civil administration, with van Cortlandt as mayor. A proclamation was made in Hartford, Connecticut, concerning William and Mary, and both sides of the controversy in New York raced to meet the messenger bringing copies of the proclamation. Leisler's agents won the race, and Leisler published the proclamation on June 22. Two days later, van Cortlandt received a copy of the official notice that William and Mary had prepared for Andros. The transmission of this document had been delayed at the behest of Massachusetts agents in London.

It specifically retained all non-Catholic officeholders until further notice, and technically legitimized the rule of the council in Nicholson's absence. In accordance with this document, van Cortlandt fired the customs collector, who was Catholic, and replaced him with Bayard and others to oversee customs activities. Leisler objected to this assertion of power and descended on the customs house with a troop of militia. Accounts left by both sides of the dispute state that there was a near riot, and Bayard claimed to barely escape being killed by a mob. Bayard then fled to Albany, followed by van Cortlandt a few days later. Philipse withdrew from political life, leaving Leisler in effective control of the city.

On June 26, a convention composed of delegates from a number of communities from lower New York and East Jersey established a committee of safety to oversee affairs. This committee essentially became the nucleus of Leisler's later government. They chose Leisler to be the province's commander-in-chief "till orders shall come from their Majesties."

Through July and August, his hand-picked militia exercised de facto control over the city, financed by provincial funds which Nicholson had deposited in the fort. He was assisted by sympathetic officials from Connecticut who sent a troop of militia to assist in holding the fort. Nicholson's company of regulars was formally disbanded on August 1, about the same time that formal word arrived that France and England were at war.

Leisler dispatched Jost Stoll and Matthew Clarkson to England on August 15 to bolster his position with the government in London. They carried documents intended to support accusations that Nicholson had been conspiring against the people of New York and to justify the propriety of Leisler's actions against his "oppressive" rule. The agents were instructed to request a new charter for the province and to claim that the united colonies could defeat New France without assistance from the home country. He made no specific requests that the new charter include any sort of democratic representation.

An election ordered Leisler's committee of safety formally to turn van Cortlandt out of office in October, consolidating Leisler's command over New York except the Albany area. According to Bayard, the turnout in New York City was extremely low, with barely 100 voters participating. Councilors Bayard and Philipse issued a proclamation on October 20 calling Leisler's rule illegal, and ordered other militia commanders to stop supporting him. The proclamation had no effect.

=== Resistance in Albany ===
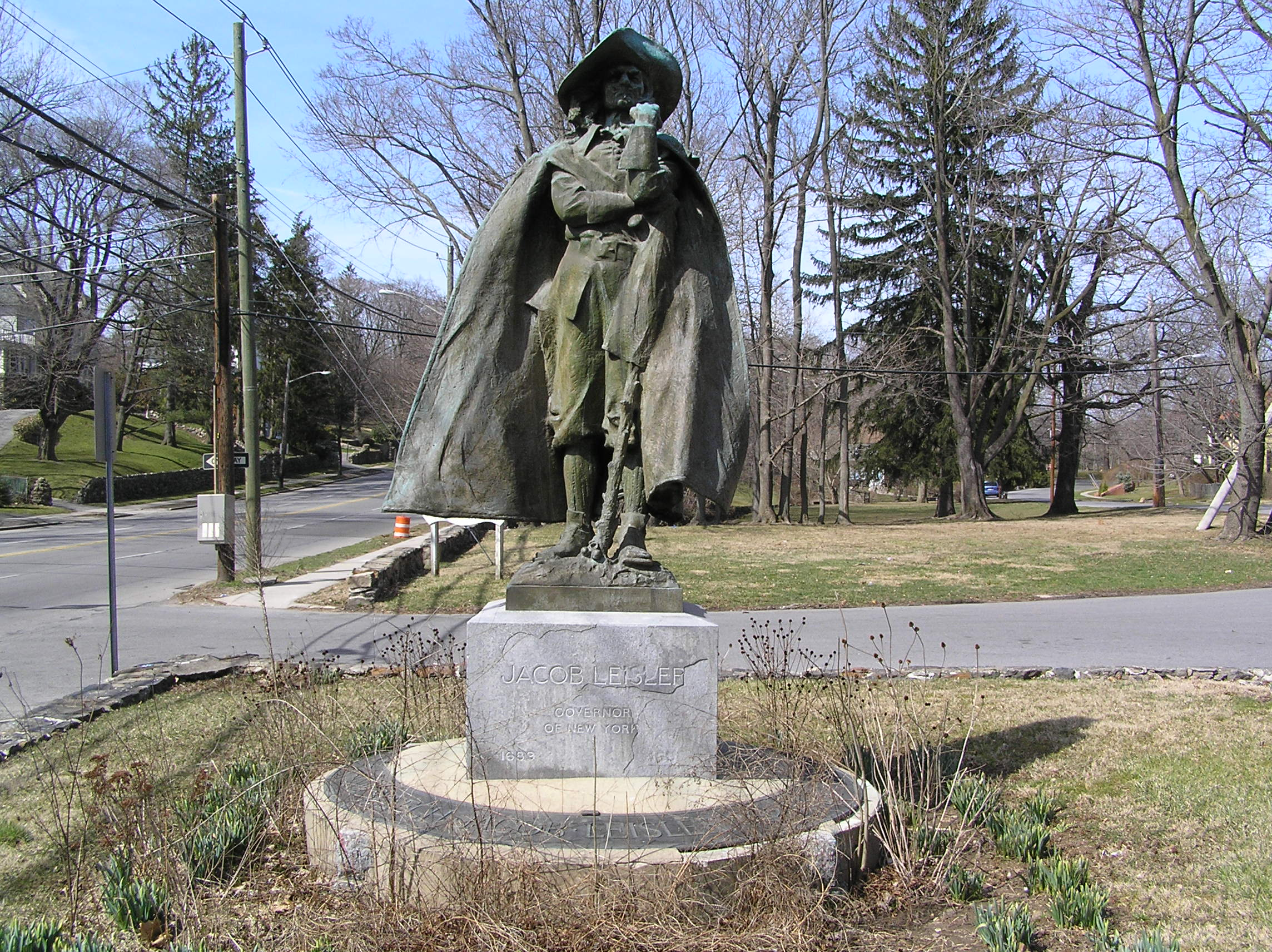
Statue of Jacob Leisler in New Rochelle, New York.

Leisler's opponents had assumed control of Albany and the immediate area. On July 1, they formally proclaimed William and Mary and, on August 1, established a convention to rule. The convention included local militia leaders and the city fathers of Albany, wealthy landowners from the Hudson River valley, and it became the nucleus of anti-Leisler activities in the province. The convention categorically refused to recognize Leisler's rule unless he presented a commission from William and Mary.

Albany's situation became tense in September when local Indians brought rumors of an imminent attack from French Canada. Leisler was interdicting movement of military supplies up the Hudson, so Albany officials ended up making an appeal to him. He responded by sending Jacob Milborne, a close advisor and future son-in-law, with a militia troop to take military control of Albany in November.

However, the convention objected to the terms that Milborne demanded in exchange for his support, and he was refused entry to the city and Fort Frederick. He was warned by an Iroquois woman that a large body of Indians near Albany saw him as a threat to their friends in Albany and would react if he attempted to assert military control over the area. Milborne returned to New York City. The convention also appealed to the neighboring colonies for military assistance, which Connecticut answered by sending 80 militiamen to Albany in late November.

Leisler finally gained control over Albany early in 1690. He called for elections at Schenectady in January 1690, in a move calculated to divide neighboring communities. In early February, during King William's War, Schenectady was attacked by French and Indian raiders, exposing the weakness of the Albany Convention's position. Each side blamed the other for the failure to defend Schenectady, but Leisler was able to capitalize on the situation. He convinced Connecticut to withdraw its militia and sent his own militia north to take control of the area. The convention capitulated, lacking any significant outside support.

=== Leisler's rule ===
A letter arrived in December 1689 from William and Mary addressed to Nicholson or "in his absence to such as for the time being take care for preserving the peace and administering the laws in our said Province of New York". The recipient was instructed to "take upon you the government of the said province". The messenger apparently sought to deliver the message to van Cortlandt and Philipse, but Leisler's militia had him seized. Leisler used this document to claim legitimacy for his governance, began styling himself "lieutenant governor", and established a governor's council to replace the committee of safety.

Leisler then began attempting to collect taxes and customs duties. He was in part successful, although he met with significant resistance from officials opposed to his rule. Some were arrested, and most of those who refused to act on his instructions were replaced. By April 1690, virtually every community in New York had officials appointed by Leisler in some of its posts. These appointed officials represented a cross-section of New York society and included prominent Dutch and English residents.

However, resistance continued to his policies, and he was attacked by a small mob on June 6 who demanded the release of political prisoners and refused to pay taxes which he had imposed. In October 1690, diverse communities protested his rule, from Dutch Harlem to Protestant English Queens County to Albany.

Leisler's principal activity in 1690 was the organization of an expedition against New France. This idea first began to take shape in a meeting in May with representatives from the neighboring colonies. To provide for New York's troops, he ordered merchants to offer up their goods and broke into their storehouses if they did not. He kept a fairly careful account of these activities, and many merchants were later repaid. Connecticut officials were unwilling to grant command to Jacob Milborne, Leisler's choice of commander, citing the experience of their own commanders. Leisler acquiesced to their choice of Fitz-John Winthrop.

The expedition was a complete failure, dissolving amidst disease and difficulties in transport and supply. However, Winthrop did avenge the Schenectady massacre of February 1690, to some extent, by sending a small party north to raid La Prairie, Quebec. Leisler blamed Winthrop for the failure (for which there were numerous causes) and briefly arrested him, eliciting protests from Connecticut Governor Robert Treat.

=== Royal response ===
King William III commissioned Colonel Henry Sloughter to be provincial governor in late 1690, but a variety of issues delayed Sloughter's departure from England. His ship was then further delayed by bad weather, and the ship carrying his lieutenant governor Major Richard Ingoldesby was first to arrive in January 1691. Ingoldesby lacked official documents (which were on Sloughter's ship), but he insisted that Leisler surrender the government and Fort James to him.

There was minor skirmishing during six weeks of stubborn resistance on the part of Leisler and stubborn imperious behavior on the part of Ingoldesby, and the city was split into armed camps with several hundred Leisler supporters occupying the fort. Ingoldesby was supported in his efforts by members of the old dominion council. By mid-March, Ingoldesby had surrounded the fort and was threatening to take it by storm. Leisler occasionally had the fort's guns fired at suspicious movements, but these only succeeded in killing a few colonists.

Sloughter arrived in New York amid this tension and proclaimed his commission on March 19, demanding that Leisler surrender the fort. Leisler was not certain that Sloughter was in fact the person appointed, but Jost Stoll had been to London and was able to convince him that Sloughter was legitimate. Leisler then sent emissaries out to negotiate with Sloughter, but he stated that he did not negotiate with his subjects and had them arrested. Leisler repeatedly rebuffed Sloughter's demands, but he was eventually convinced to surrender, probably by his now-restive garrison. Sloughter had Leisler and ten others arrested on charges of treason and imprisoned in the fort which they had just been occupying.

== Execution ==
Sloughter established a special Court of Oyer and Terminer to hear the trials of Leisler and other defendants. Some individuals were not charged, including Abraham De Peyster and Charles Lodwik, the apparent ringleaders of the initial militia action. The panel of judges included a significant number of anti-Leislerians, including Richard Ingoldesby, and was presided over by former dominion official Joseph Dudley. Leisler was arraigned by this court on March 31.

The main charge against him concerned the militant resistance to Ingoldesby's attempts to take control. Leisler and his son-in-law Jacob Milborne both refused to acknowledge the legitimacy of the court, and did not enter pleas. Leisler asked for and was granted counsel, even though English law did not mandate it. Most of the other defendants acknowledged the court's legitimacy and pleaded not guilty. On April 1, Leisler was arraigned on a count of murder over an incident that had taken place during his rule.

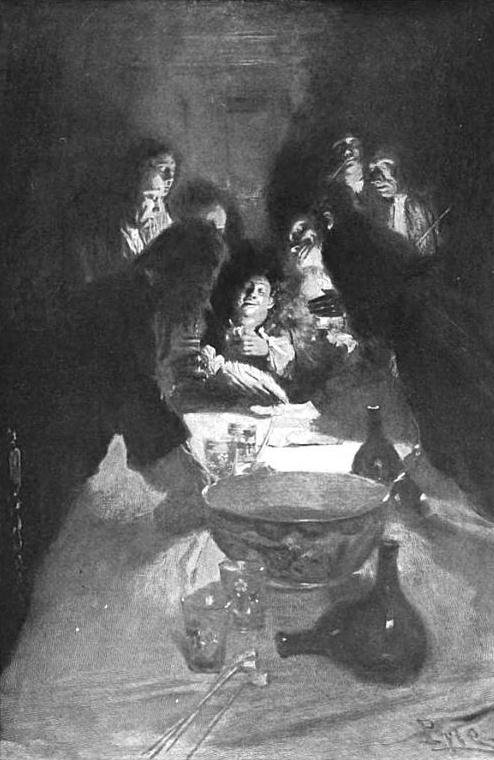
Howard Pyle's depiction of Governor Sloughter signing Leisler's death warrant.

On April 9, Sloughter convened a new colonial assembly. It passed a bill on April 17 condemning Leisler's government and activities, despite attempts by pro-Leislerians to control the body, and even blamed him for the 1690 Schenectady massacre. Leisler and Milborne were convicted on April 17, after repeated attempts by the court to get them to enter pleas, and they were sentenced to be "hanged, drawn and quartered, and their estates confiscated." No execution was scheduled.

There matters stood until mid-May. By early May, the court had heard 32 cases, convicted and sentenced eight men to death (including Leisler and Milborne), and either acquitted or pardoned the rest. Partisan forces, however, continued to be active. Anti-Leisler forces agitated for his execution, and there were riots on Staten Island in late April, supposedly instigated by Leisler supporters.

Sloughter, however, believed that the executions should be stayed until the king's will could be known. On May 7, he sent reports to the king and the Lords of Trade describing the situation and including the trial transcripts. The letter to the king painted Leisler in an extremely negative light, and neither report mentioned the death sentence.

On May 14, the court refused to transport Leisler and Milborne to England for appeal, and Sloughter's council was dominated by anti-Leislerians who urged him to execute the two men. He acquiesced and signed the death warrants that evening. Nicholas Bayard and others claim that Sloughter was drunk at the time (or at least strongly under the influence of alcohol), and accusations circulated afterward that he had been bribed. On May 16, Leisler and Milborne were executed by hanging.

Leisler is reported to have made a long speech, claiming that he acted "for the glory of the Protestant interest, the establishment of the present government", and to protect the province from outside forces. The remains of the two men were buried beneath the gallows, and their estates were seized by attainder. On May 19, Governor Sloughter issued a proclamation of amnesty for all except about 20 named individuals.

== Aftermath ==
The execution made martyrs of Leisler and Milborne and did nothing to lessen the deep divisions between pro- and anti-Leislerian factions. His supporters sent agents to London, who were eventually joined by his son Jacob, to petition the government for redress. In January 1692, their petition was heard by the King, and the Lords of Trade recommended pardons for the convicted in April. On May 13, 1692, Queen Mary instructed incoming governor Benjamin Fletcher to pardon the six remaining prisoners.

Governor Sloughter's sudden death on July 23, 1691, was viewed in some circles with suspicion that he had been poisoned, although the autopsy indicated that the cause was pneumonia. He left behind a letter in which he claimed to have been "constrained" by the forces around him to order the execution. Other acts during his tenure also sparked comment. Ingoldesby took the reins of government after his death and accused him of pocketing £1,100 intended to pay the troops, and he was said to have seized a prize ship that had been captured and sold at auction during his time in office, and then sold it a second time.

One of Leisler's supporters had stopped in Boston while en route to England and was offered support by Sir William Phips, the new governor of the Province of Massachusetts Bay. Massachusetts agents in London then worked on behalf of Leisler's heirs to have the attainder reversed and the family properties restored. A bill was introduced into Parliament to do so in 1695, with the assistance of Massachusetts supporters Sir Henry Ashurts and Sir Constantine Henry Phipps. The bill quickly passed in the House of Lords, although anti-Leislerian agents succeeded in having it sent to committee in the lower chamber. It was finally passed on May 2, 1695, after extensive hearings in which Joseph Dudley defended his actions by accusing Leisler of improperly seizing power because he was a foreigner. It received the royal assent the next day.

However, it was not until 1698 that Leisler's heirs finally received their due. The Earl of Bellomont arrived that year, commissioned as New York's governor in 1695 and an outspoken supporter of Leisler in the parliamentary debate. He died in office in 1701, but during his tenure he placed pro-Leislerians in key positions in his government. He oversaw the restoration of the family estate, and had the bodies of Leisler and Milborne properly reburied in the yard of the Dutch Reform Church.

Pro- and anti-Leisler factions remained in contention at the provincial level until the arrival of Governor Robert Hunter in 1710. Over time, the Leislerians tended to associate with the English Whig faction, and the anti-Leislerians with the English Tories. Hunter was a Whig who generally favored the Leislerians, but he was able to calm the bitterness that existed between the factions.

== Significance ==
Some historians, including the American historian K. Waterman, see the rebellion primarily as a Dutch revolt against English authority. However, Leisler failed to win the backing of the Dutch Reformed Church. Leisler, the son of a German Reformed minister, exploited popular anti-Catholic sentiment and was primarily supported by artisans and small traders who opposed the dominion of wealthy merchants such as the patroons.

Leisler's Rebellion follows a pattern, however, with other rebellions in the same period: Bacon's Rebellion in 1676, the 1689 Boston revolt that deposed Andros, 1683's failed Gove's Rebellion in New Hampshire, Culpeper's Rebellion in North Carolina in 1677, and the Protestant Rebellion against the Catholic-dominated government in Maryland in 1689.

== See also ==
- Protestant Revolution in Maryland

== Bibliography ==
- Balmer, R. (1989). "Traitors and papists: the religious dimensions of Leisler's Rebellion". New York History. 70 (4): 341–372. JSTOR i23178497.
- Doyle, J. A. (1907). English Colonies in America: The Middle Colonies. New York: Henry Holt. OCLC 670083863.
- Dunn, R. (2007). "Patronage and Governance in Francis Nicholson's Empire". English Atlantics Revisited. Montreal: McGill-Queen's Press: 59–80. doi:10.1515/9780773560406-006. ISBN 9780773532199.
- Lovejoy, D. (1987). The Glorious Revolution in America. Middletown: Wesleyan University Press. ISBN 9780819561770.
- Lustig, M. L. (1995). Privilege and Prerogative: New York's Provincial Elite, 1710–1776. Madison: Fairleigh Dickinson University Press. ISBN 9780838635544.
- Lustig, M. L. (2002). The Imperial Executive in America: Sir Edmund Andros, 1637–1714. Madison: Fairleigh Dickinson University Press. ISBN 9780838639368.
- McCormick, C. H. (1989). Leisler's Rebellion. Outstanding Studies in Early American History. New York: Garland. ISBN 0-824-06190-X.
- Reich, J. R. (1953). Leisler's Rebellion: A Study of Democracy in New York, 1664–1720. University of Chicago Press. OCLC 476516.
- Van Rensselaer, Schuyler (1909). History of the city of New York in the seventeenth century. Vol. II. The Macmillan Company. OCLC 938239.
- Webb, S. S. (1966). "The Strange Career of Francis Nicholson". The William and Mary Quarterly. 23 (4): 513–548. doi:10.2307/1919124. JSTOR 1919124.
- Webb, S. S. (1998). Lord Churchill's Coup: The Anglo-American Empire and the Glorious Revolution Reconsidered. Syracuse University Press. ISBN 978-0-81560-5584.

=== Further reading ===
- Balmer, Ronald (October 1989). "Traitors and Papists: The Religious Dimensions of Leisler's Rebellion". New York History. 70 (4). Fenimore Art Museum: 341–379. JSTOR 23178499.
- Burke, Thomas E. Jr. (October 1989). "Leisler's Rebellion at Schenectady, New York, 1689–1710". New York History. 70 (4). Fenimore Art Museum: 405–430. JSTOR 23178501.
- Postma, J.; Enthoven, V. (2003). Riches from Atlantic Commerce: Dutch Transatlantic Trade and Shipping, 1585-1817. Leiden: Brill Publishers. ISBN 978-9-00412-5629.
- Van Rensselaer, Schuyler (1909). History of the city of New York in the seventeenth century. Vol. I. The Macmillan Company.
- Waterman, K. (1991). "Leisler's Rebellion, 1689–1690: Being Dutch In Albany". Maryland Historian. 22 (2): 21–40.
- Voorhees, David William (Winter 1997). ""to assert our Right before it be quite lost": The Leisler Rebellion in the Delaware River Valley". Pennsylvania History: A Journal of Mid-Atlantic Studies. 64 (1). Penn State University Press: 5–27. JSTOR 27773953.

=== Primary sources ===
- Andrews, Charles (1915). Narratives of the insurrections, 1675–1690, Volume 16. New York: C. Scribner's Sons. OCLC 698030. online
