= Statue of Jacob Leisler =

Bronze sculpture in New Rochelle, New York

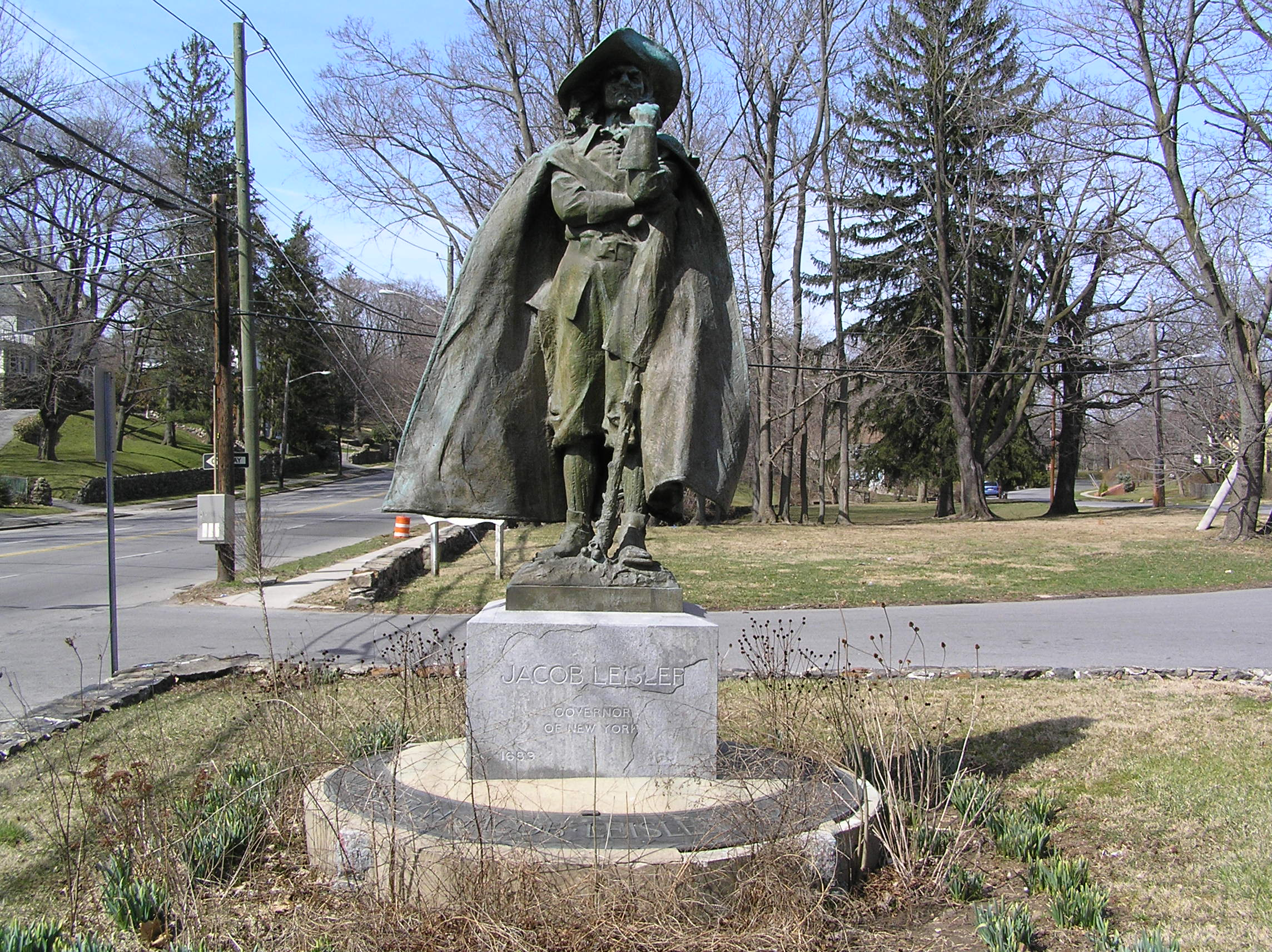
- 1913 Statue of Leisler on North Avenue in New Rochelle, New York

- Location within New York
- Artist: Solon Borglum
- Year: 1913
- Medium: Bronze
- Subject: Jacob Leisler
- Dimensions: 2.7 m × 1.5 m × 0.91 m (9 ft × 5 ft × 3 ft)
- Location: New Rochelle, New York; 40°55′59″N 73°47′28″W

The Jacob Leisler Monument is a bronze sculpture created by American artist Solon Borglum and located in the city of New Rochelle, in Westchester County, New York. The monument was erected by the Huguenot Chapter of the Daughters of the American Revolution, and the Huguenot Association of New Rochelle to commemorate Jacob Leisler, 17th-century advocate of the Huguenot settlers and said to be the first chief executive of the province of New York to draw his power directly from the people. The unveiling of the statue on June 24, 1913, was the principal event in the celebration of the 250th anniversary of the founding of New Rochelle. The monument, cast by the Roman Bronze Works, is the only existing statue of Leisler.

Jacob Leisler was German-born and came to North America in 1660 as a soldier in the Dutch West India Company's service. Settling in New Amsterdam (New York), he left the company and prospered in the tobacco and fur trades, becoming a wealthy merchant and being appointed to several public offices in the city, such as justice of the peace and judge. Beginning in 1689, following the English Revolution in 1688 and accession of the Protestant rulers William III and Mary II, he led an insurrection dubbed Leisler's Rebellion, with popular support among the common people, ultimately seizing control of the city and colony from Jacobite officials previously appointed under the deposed King James. He appointed himself as acting Lieutenant Governor of the Province until the governor appointed by William and Mary finally reached New York in March 1691. During this period, he had purchased land from Pelham Manor, reserving a portion to help create the Huguenot settlement of New Rochelle in 1689. He refused to turn over power to a newly appointed lieutenant governor in 1690.

Leisler in 1691 was arrested and tried by his personal and political enemies on charges of felony and treason to William III and Mary II, for refusing to give up power to their appointed Lieutenant Governor before the full governor arrived several months later. He and his son-in-law were both executed. Many thought the trial was unjust. Four years later, Parliament reversed the conviction, clearing Leisler's name and restoring his estate to his heirs. They exonerated the late friend of the Huguenots.

== Detail ==
Due to the fact that no portrait is known to exist of Jacob Leisler, the sculpture depicts a generic male figure of his "type" dressed in period clothing. This includes a long cape, knee breeches, boots, and a hat. In his right hand the figure holds a walking stick and his left arm rests along the top of the stick. The sculpture is installed on a square stone base resting on a circular concrete foundation. The sculpture measures approximately 9 x 5 x 3 feet, with a base of 4 feet 30 inches x 4 feet 30 inches. The foundation is approximately 1 foot in height by 10 feet in diameter.

The inscription reads:

SOLON H. BORGLUM ROMAN BRONZE WORKS N.Y.
(On front of base:)
JACOB LEISLER, GOVERNOR OF NEW YORK, 1689
(On back of base:)
ERECTED BY

HUGUENOT CHAPTER, DAUGHTERS OF THE REVOLUTION, STATE OF NEW YORK AND THE HUGUENOT ASSOCIATION OF NEW ROCHELLE

DEDICATED JUNE 25, 1913
(Around top of circular foundation:)
JACOB LEISLER 1620-1691 DEFENDER OF FREEDOM OF POLITICAL THOUGHT AND SPEECH signed Founder's mark appears.

The same month that the monument was dedicated, a play by William O. Bates was published: Jacob Leisler: A Play of Old New York, portraying the leader in his heroic mode.

== Sources ==
- Index of American Sculpture, University of Delaware, 1985
- National Park Service, American Monuments and Outdoor Sculpture Database, NY0126, 1989.
- Monumental News, May 1913, p. 340.
- Save Outdoor Sculpture, New York survey, 1994.
