= Henry Sloughter =

English Army officer

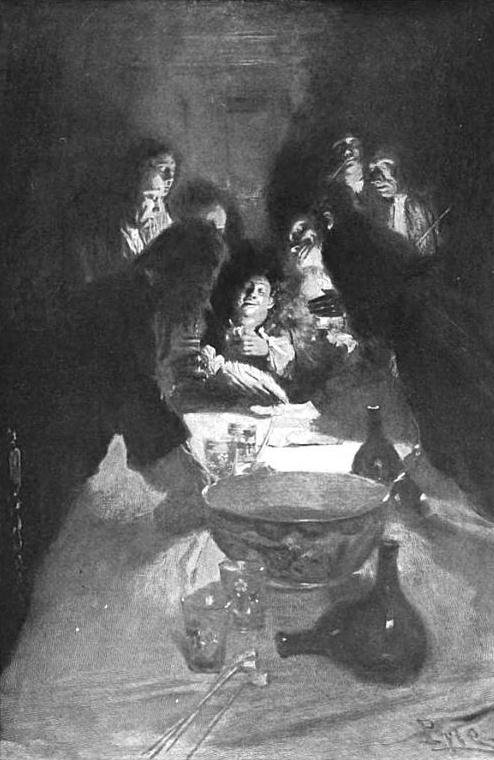
Sloughter (left) signing Jacob Leisler's death warrant

Colonel Henry Sloughter (died July 23, 1691) was an English Army officer and colonial administrator who briefly served as the governor of New York in 1691. Sloughter was sent from England to the Province of New York to put down Leisler's Rebellion, which had installed Jacob Leisler as the de facto governor in 1689. However, he died suddenly in July 1691, and Richard Ingoldesby, who had fought against Leisler's rebels, took over after Sloughter's death until the arrival of Benjamin Fletcher.

Government offices
Preceded by Jacob Leisler (in rebellion)	Governor of New York; 1691	Succeeded by Richard Ingoldesby (acting)
