= Jacob Leisler =

Leader of the Leisler Rebellion, de facto governor of New York (1640–1691)

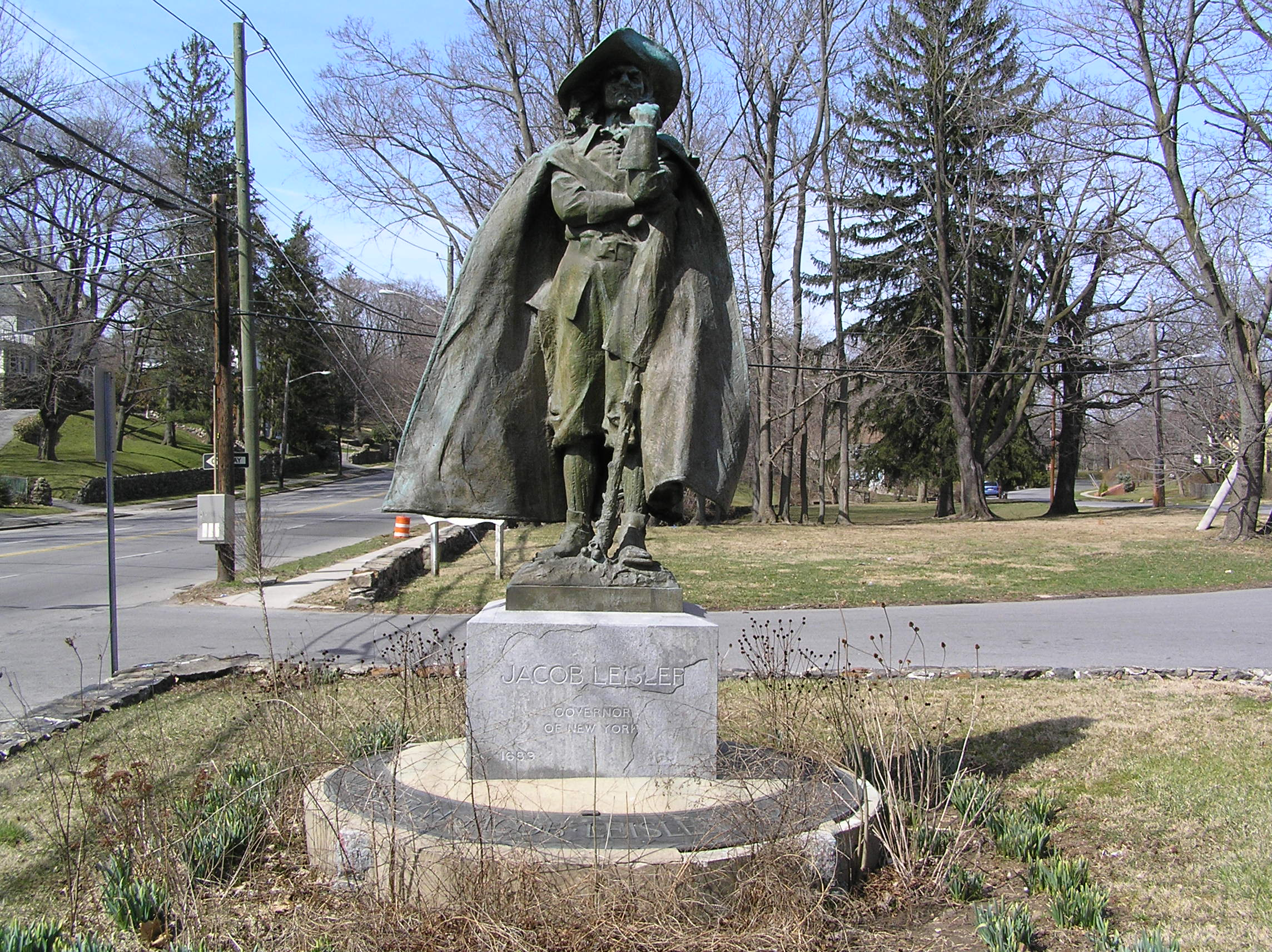
- The statue of Jacob Leisler (1913) on North Avenue in New Rochelle, New York

8th Colonial Governor of New York
- In office 1689 – 1691 in rebellion
- Monarchs: William III and Mary II
- Preceded by: Francis Nicholson
- Succeeded by: Henry Sloughter

Personal details
- Born: c. 1640 Bockenheim, Holy Roman Empire
- Died: May 16, 1691 (aged 50–51) New York City, Province of New York, English America
- Spouse: Elsie Tymens (m. 1663)
- Profession: Merchant, Lieutenant governor of New York
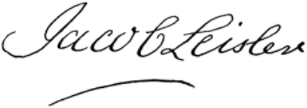
- Signature

Jacob Leisler (c. 1640 – May 16, 1691) was a German-born politician and colonial administrator in the Province of New York. He gained wealth in New Amsterdam (later New York City) in the North American fur trade and tobacco business. In what became known as Leisler's Rebellion following the Glorious Revolution of 1688, he took control of the city, and ultimately the entire province, from appointees of deposed King James II, in the name of the Protestant accession of William III and Mary II.

Beginning in 1689, Leisler led an insurrection and seized control of the city by taking over Fort James at the lower end of Manhattan. He took over control of the entire province, appointing himself as acting Lieutenant Governor of the Province of New York, which he retained until March 1691, refusing to yield power until the newly appointed governor himself finally arrived. While Leisler claimed to have acted to support the Protestant accession against Jacobite officeholders in New York, he was arrested by the newly appointed governor of New York in March 1691. With opponents active against him, he was condemned and executed in New York City for treason against the Crown. His estate was forfeited to the Crown.

During his period of control, Leisler completed a major purchase of property from Sir John Pell, Lord of Pelham Manor, to set up a French Huguenot settlement north of Manhattan. This developed as the city of New Rochelle, New York. Leisler's son and supporters found the trial and conviction most unjust; it was mounted by his enemies. They worked to clear the names of Leisler and Jacob Milborne (his son-in-law) and for the restoration of their estates to their heirs. They gained an act of Parliament in 1695 to achieve this. Remains of the two men were reinterred with honors at the Dutch Reformed Church in Manhattan.

== Early life ==
Leisler was born in the village of Bockenheim (now a part of Frankfurt am Main, Germany, then the Holy Roman Empire), in March 1640, the son of Calvinist French Reformed minister Jacob Victorian Leisler. After his father's death in 1651, Leisler was sent to military school.

He went to New Amsterdam (later New York) in 1660 as a soldier in the service of the Dutch West India Company. Leaving the company's employ soon after his arrival, Leisler engaged in the lucrative fur trade and tobacco trade and became a wealthy man. New York tax records from 1676 list Leisler as the third wealthiest man in the city.

In 1674, Leisler was one of the administrators of a forced loan imposed by Anthony Colve. While residing in Albany in 1676, Leisler engaged in a theological dispute with the Rev. Nicholas van Rensselaer, who had been appointed to the Reformed pulpit by James, Duke of York (later King King James II). His finances and reputation both suffered from this encounter, as he and fellow dissenter Jacob Milborne were forced to pay all the costs of a lawsuit they had initiated in the dispute. While on a voyage to Europe in 1678, Leisler was captured by Moorish pirates. He was forced to pay a ransom of 2,050 pieces of eight to obtain his freedom.

Leisler had endeared himself to the common people by befriending a family of French Huguenots who had been landed on Manhattan Island. They were so destitute that a public tribunal had decided they should be sold into slavery to pay their ship charges. Leisler prevented the sale by purchasing the freedom of the widowed mother and son before the sale could be held. French Huguenots were arriving in New York as refugees from religious persecution by Catholics in France. Under Thomas Dongan's administration in 1683, Leisler was appointed one of the judges, or "commissioners," of the court of admiralty in New York, a justice of the peace for New York City and County, and a militia captain.

== Leisler's Rebellion ==
The Glorious Revolution of 1688 also played out in New York, where people of a wide variety of religious and ethnic backgrounds divided into two well-defined factions. In general, the small shopkeepers, small farmers, sailors, poor traders and artisans allied against the patroons (landholders), rich fur traders, merchants, lawyers, and crown officers. The former were led by Leisler (although he was a wealthy man), the latter by Peter Schuyler, Nicholas Bayard, Stephen Van Cortlandt, William Nicolls, and other representatives of the elite Hudson Valley families. The Leislerians claimed greater loyalty to the Protestant accession.

In 1688, Governor Dongan was succeeded by Lieutenant-Governor Francis Nicholson. In 1689, the military force of the city of New York consisted of a regiment of five companies, with Leisler as one of the company captains. He was popular with the men and was probably the only wealthy resident in the province who sympathized with the Dutch lower classes, who were agitated by the attempts of the Jacobite officeholders to retain power in spite of the revolution in England and the accession of William III and Mary II to the throne. When news was received that Governor Sir Edmund Andros had been imprisoned in Boston by the opposition, the Leislerians took possession on May 31, 1689, of Fort James at the southern end of Manhattan Island. They renamed it Fort William and announced their determination to hold it until the arrival of a governor who was commissioned by the new sovereigns.

Upon hearing of a report which claimed supporters of King James II were about to seize the fort and massacre settlers of Dutch descent, an armed mob gathered on the evening of June 2, 1689, to overthrow the existing government. The cry of "Leisler" was raised, and the crowd rushed to his house. At first, he refused to lead the movement, but when the demand was reiterated, he acceded and within an hour received the keys of the fort, which had been seized. The revolutionaries took advantage of the fort containing all the public funds, whose return Lieutenant Governor Nicholson demanded in vain.

Four hundred of the new party signed an agreement to hold the fort "for the present Protestant power that reigns in England," and a committee of safety of ten of the city freeholders assumed the powers of a provisional government of which they declared Jacob Leisler to be the head. They commissioned him as "captain of the fort." In this capacity, he began to repair the fort, strengthening it with a battery of six guns beyond its walls. This was the origin of the public park known as the Battery in Lower Manhattan. Thus began Leisler's Rebellion.

=== Leisler as acting lieutenant-governor ===
The aristocrats also favored deposing James but preferred to continue the provincial government established by his authority, rather than risk the danger of an interregnum. Nicholson and the council of the province, with the authorities of the city, headed by Mayor Stephen van Cortlandt, attempted to prevent the uprising, but without effect. Finally, becoming alarmed for his own safety, Lieutenant-Governor Nicholson sailed for England on June 24. The New York City mayor and other officials retired to Albany.

Albany held out against Leisler's authority for a time. In November, Leisler sent Jacob Milborne to Albany with an armed force to assist in its defense against any Indians. Milborne was directed to withhold aid unless Leisler's authority was recognized. That was refused, and Milborne returned unsuccessful. However, after the destruction of Schenectady on February 19, 1690, by the French and their allied Indians, Christian Mohawk among them, Albany submitted to Leisler's authority.

Under authority of a letter from the home government addressed to Nicholson "or in his absence, to such as for the time being takes care for preserving the peace and administering the laws in His Majesty's province of New York," Leisler had assumed the title of lieutenant-governor in December 1689. He dissolved the committee of safety, appointed a council, and took charge of the government of the entire province. He appointed Jacob Milborne as Clerk to the Council, Attorney-General, Advocate General and his Secretary. Milborne married Leisler's daughter Mary.

Leisler summoned the first Intercolonial Congress in America, which met in New York on May 1, 1690, to plan concerted action against the French and Native Americans in the ongoing conflict in North America. The congress planned an expedition against Canada. It equipped and dispatched against Quebec the first fleet of men-of-war ever sent from the Port of New York. However, the expedition was unsuccessful.

In the meantime, Colonel Henry Sloughter had been commissioned Governor of the Province of New York by William and Mary on September 3, 1689, but he did not reach New York until March 19, 1691.

=== Leisler and Huguenots ===
Acting on behalf of a group of Huguenots in New York, Leisler brokered the purchase of land upon which they could settle. In 1689 John Pell, Lord of Pelham Manor, officially deeded 6,100 acres (25 km²) to Leisler for the establishment of a Huguenot community north of Manhattan. On September 20, 1689, Leisler donated a third of this land to Huguenot refugees. In addition to the purchase money, Leisler and his heirs and assigns were to yield and pay unto John Pell and his heirs and assigns (Lords of the Pelham Manor) one "Fat Calf" yearly, as acknowledgment of their feudal obligation to the Manor. This settlement developed as the city of New Rochelle, New York.

=== End of rebellion ===
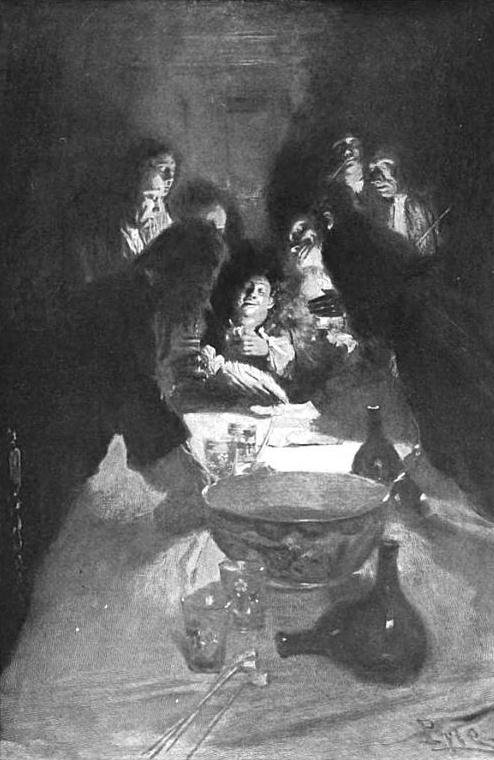
Howard Pyle's depiction of Governor Sloughter signing Leisler's death warrant

On January 28, 1691, English Army officer Richard Ingoldesby, who had been commissioned lieutenant-governor of the province, landed with two companies of soldiers in Manhattan and demanded possession of Fort James. Leisler refused to surrender the fort without an order from the king or the governor. After some controversy, Ingoldesby attacked the fort on March 17, during which Leisler's forces killed two of his soldiers and wounded several.

When Governor Sloughter finally arrived in New York the following March, he immediately demanded Leisler's surrender. Leisler refused to surrender the fort until he was convinced of Sloughter's identity, and the governor had sworn in his council. As soon as the latter event occurred, he wrote the governor a letter resigning his command.

Sloughter responded by arresting Leisler and nine of his colleagues, including his son-in-law Jacob Milborne. All but Milborne were released after trial. Leisler was imprisoned and charged with treason and murder. Shortly afterward, he was tried and condemned to death. His son-in-law and secretary, Milborne, was condemned on the same charges. Leisler's son and other supporters were outraged by the trials, as they were considered unjust. The judges were the personal and political enemies of the prisoners, and their acts were described as "gross."

Governor Sloughter was said to have hesitated to sign the death warrants but was trying to stabilize politics in the colony and did not have sufficient influence among the elite of New York City. He was said to have finally signed the warrants under the influence of wine.

On May 16, 1691, Leisler and Milborne were executed. Leisler's wife's nephews, Bayard and Van Cortland, were on the Council that insisted upon his execution. The court had sentenced them to be hanged "by the Neck and being Alive their bodyes be Cutt downe to Earth and Their Bowells to be taken out and they being Alive, burnt before their faces...." As was the common law punishment for treason, their estates were forfeited to the Crown. Leisler's son and other supporters appealed for justice from the committee of the Privy Council. It reported that although the trial was in conformity to the forms of law, they recommended the restoration of the estates to their heirs.

== Restitution ==
Leisler's Restoration Act 1695
- Act of Parliament
- Parliament of England
- Long title: An Act for reversing the Attainder of Jacob Leister and others.
- Citation: 6 & 7 Will. & Mar. c. 30 Pr.
- Territorial extent: England and Wales

Dates
- Royal assent: 3 May 1695
- Commencement: 12 November 1694 (Note: Start of session.)

Status: Current legislation

In 1695, by an act of Parliament, Leisler's Restoration Act 1695 (6 & 7 Will. & Mar. c. 30 Pr.), achieved through the efforts of Leisler's son and supporters, the names of Jacob Leisler and Milborne were cleared, and Leisler's estate was restored to his heirs. Three years later the Earl of Bellomont, who had been one of the most influential supporters of Leisler's son, was appointed as governor of New York. Through his influence, the assembly voted an indemnity to Leisler's heirs.

== Personal life ==
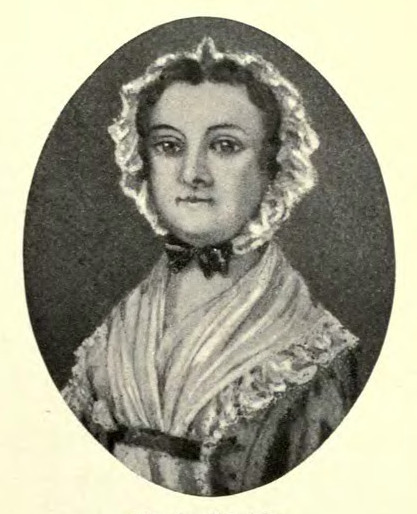
Elsje Tymans Leisler

Leisler married Elsie Tymens, the widow of Pieter Cornelisz van der Veen, in 1663. They had three daughters:

- Catharine Leisler, who in 1685 married Robert Walters (d. 1733), mayor of New York City from 1720 to 1725.
- Susannah Leisler, who in 1687 married Michael Vaughton of Staffordshire, a half-brother of John Spragg, the colonial secretary of New York.
- Mary Leisler, who in 1691 married Jacob Milborne (c. 1648-1691), who was executed with his father-in-law.

Some descendants of Leisler use his surname as a middle name. The most prominent of them was Walther Leisler Kiep, a CDU politician.

== Legacy and honors ==
- Governor Bellomont authorized the honorable reburial of Leisler and his son-in-law at the Dutch Reformed Church in New York City.
- In June 1913, a monument to Jacob Leisler was dedicated in New Rochelle, New York, by the Huguenot Chapter of the Daughters of the American Revolution and the Huguenot Association of New Rochelle, to celebrate the 250th anniversary of its founding and honor his role. Leisler has been described as the "first Governor of Colonial New York to owe his position to the popular suffrage." The monument was created by sculptor Solon Borglum, a world-renowned artist in his time.
- In June 1913, William O. Bates published his play, Jacob Leisler: A Play of Old New York, about the leader and the dramatic events of his life.
- Leisler was depicted by Nazi German propagandist playwright Curt Langenbeck in his play Der Hochverräter. Tragisches Schauspiel (1938) as a hero.

== Bibliography ==
- John Romeyn Brodhead, History of the State of New York (vol. 2, New York, 1871)
- Burrows, Edwin G., and Mike Wallace. Gotham: A History of New York City to 1898 (1999) pp. 91–102.
- O'Callaghan, Edmund Bailey (1850). Documentary history of the state of New-York. Vol. II. Albany: Weed, Parsons & Co., Public Printers.
- Voorhees, David William (July 1994), "The 'fervent Zeale' of Jacob Leisler", William and Mary Quarterly, 3rd ser., 51 (3): 447–472, doi:10.2307/2947438, JSTOR 2947438
- Voorhees, David William (2010). Explorers, Fortunes and Love Letters. New Netherland Institute; Mount Ida Press. ISBN 9781438430041.

Wallace,

Government offices
Preceded by Edmund Andros; Francis Nicholson as Governor and Lieutenant Governor of the Dominion of New England	Governor of the Province of New York (in rebellion); December 1689-January 28, 1691	Succeeded by Henry Sloughter
