= Justice Morris =

Justice Morris may refer to:

- Brian Morris (judge) (born 1963), associate justice of the Montana Supreme Court
- Charles Morris (surveyor general) (1711–1781), chief justice of the Nova Scotia Supreme Court
- Claude F. Morris (1869–1957), associate justice of the Montana Supreme Court
- Douglas J. Morris (1861–1928), associate justice of the Indiana Supreme Court
- George E. Morris (died 1919), associate justice of the Washington Supreme Court
- James Morris (North Dakota judge) (1893–1980), associate justice of the North Dakota Supreme Court
- Lewis Morris (governor) (1671–1746), chief justice of the Colonial New York Supreme Court
- Martin Ferdinand Morris (1834–1909), associate justice of the Court of Appeals of the District of Columbia
- Michael Morris, Baron Morris (1826–1901), Lord Chief Justice of Ireland
- Richard Morris (Texas judge) (1815–1844), associate justice of the Texas Supreme Court
- Richard Morris (New York judge) (1730–1810), chief justice of the New York Supreme Court
- Robert Morris (judge) (1745–1815), chief justice of the Supreme Court of New Jersey
- Robert Hunter Morris (c. 1700–1764), chief justice of the Supreme Court of New Jersey
- Thomas Morris (Ohio politician) (1776–1844), associate justice of the Ohio State Supreme Court

== See also ==
- Judge Morris (disambiguation)
