= John Reading (New Jersey governor) =

Acting colonial governor of New Jersey from 1747–48, 1757–58

Acting Governor of the Province of New Jersey
- In office 17 June 1747 – 10 August 1747
- Preceded by: John Hamilton (President of Council)
- Succeeded by: Gov. Jonathan Belcher

Acting Governor of the Province of New Jersey
- In office 31 August 1757 – 22 September 1757
- Preceded by: Gov. Jonathan Belcher
- Succeeded by: Lt. Gov. Thomas Pownall

Acting Governor of the Province of New Jersey
- In office 22 September 1757 – 16 June 1758
- Preceded by: Lt. Gov. Thomas Pownall
- Succeeded by: Gov. Francis Bernard

President of the New Jersey Provincial Council
- In office 17 June 1747 – 12 December 1758
- Preceded by: John Hamilton
- Succeeded by: Robert Hunter Morris

Member of the New Jersey Provincial Council for the Western Division
- In office 15 June 1713 – 12 December 1758

Personal details
- Born: 6 June 1686 Gloucester, New Jersey
- Died: 5 November 1767 (aged 81)
- Resting place: Old Amwell Presbyterian Churchyard
- Occupation: Surveyor and politician, Acting Governor of New Jersey

John Reading (6 June 1686 – 5 November 1767) was the first native-born governor of the British Province of New Jersey, serving in 1747, and again from September 1757 to June 1758. His father, Colonel John Reading, was the first major landowner in Hunterdon County.

Governor Reading was one of the founders and trustees of the College of New Jersey, which later became Princeton University. The Reading family is still influential in the state of New Jersey.

== Early life and political career ==
Coat of Arms of John Reading

John Reading was born at Gloucester, West Jersey on 6 June 1686. John and his sister Elsie were sent with their mother to England for education, where they remained for several years. Upon return to the Province of New Jersey, Reading assisted his father in his work as a surveyor and in the management of his extensive landed interest. He inherited a large estate upon his father's death in 1717, especially in land, which made him the wealthiest man in Hunterdon county.

On 3 November 1718, he was nominated by Governor Hunter to a seat in the provincial council at the young age of thirty-two. At the same time, Reading was named commissioner to run the north boundary line between New Jersey and New York. and one of the commissioners to run the lines between East and West New Jersey.

On 24 June 1720 Reading was appointed to the council of the new governor William Burnet. Reading retained the post until 1758, when he resigned. On two occasions during his tenure he became acting governor and commander-in-chief of the province.

On 10 February 1727, Mr. Reading was commissioned "Collonel of ye Military Regiment of ffoot for ye county of Hunterdon, whereof Daniel Cox, Esq. was Collonel," and on the same day he was appointed president judge of the court of common pleas of that county. On 14 August 1727, he was commissioned surrogate for Hunterdon and Somerset counties.

On 6 November 1728, he was appointed by the Crown one of the judges "to try pirates." In addition to these offices he held that of one of his Majesty's justices of the peace. On 18 April 1740 he was appointed one of the officers for Hunterdon county to enlist men to fight the war then waging against Spain, and in that year was also appointed by the King as one of the commissioners to define the boundary between the colonies of Massachusetts and Rhode Island. He was also for some years one of the agents for the family of William Penn in managing their landed interests in New Jersey.

== Acting Governor and Governor ==
On the death of Lewis Morris, governor of the province, 21 May 1746, the administration fell to Colonel John Hamilton, who remained at the head of the government until his death on 17 June 1747. Reading then became president of the council and succeeded Colonel Hamilton as acting governor and commander-in-chief, being the first native-born Jerseyman to govern the province.

Reading's administration was a brief one. On 10 August, he was succeeded by Jonathan Belcher of Massachusetts, who had received the king's appointment to the governorship in the previous February. Governor Belcher continued at the head of the government until his death on 31 August 1757. Reading was still the senior member of the council, and the administration devolved upon him. His age and infirmities were such that he at first declined to act, but he finally consented to assume the duties. He assumed the office on 9 September 1757, and on the 10th wrote to Thomas Pownall, the Governor of Massachusetts, whose commission also named him Lieutenant-Governor of New Jersey, asking to be relieved immediately of office due to infirmities and ill health.

Governor Pownall took the oath of office on 22 September 1757. Governor Pownall's administration lasted a single day: Pownall found that, while Reading was physically weak, he was mentally strong, and that he commanded the respect and confidence of the people to an unusual degree, so he returned to Massachusetts, leaving the government to Reading.

Prior to the union of the provinces, Perth Amboy was the seat of government of East Jersey and Burlington of West Jersey. After the union the two seats were retained, and the general assembly, to accommodate the people of both sections, usually alternated between the two places. Frequently, however, temporary changes were made to meet the pleasure of the governor. One of such changes occurred in October, 1757, when the assembly met at Trenton, to suit the convenience of Reading, who was located there for medical treatment. The assembly felt the importance of having President Reading reside at one or the other of the official seats, and, recognizing that his physical condition was such that it would discomfort him to be compelled to stay at an inn, offered to provide at the public expense a home at each capital for the use of himself and family.

Early in March, 1758, letters arrived from England, announcing the appointment of Major-General James Abercrombie to succeed the earl of Loudoun in the command of the King's forces in North America, and calling upon the provincial governments to raise troops to fight in the Seven Years' War. The letter to Reading was delivered to him on 6 March. Reading responded immediately to the King's call, and summoned a meeting of the general assembly, which convened at Burlington on 23 March. On the following day, he delivered addresses to the General Assembly calling for raising of troops to support the King in the war. He also issued a proclamation for the raising of a regiment for immediate service. Reading appointed a day of fasting and prayer.

== Retirement to private life ==
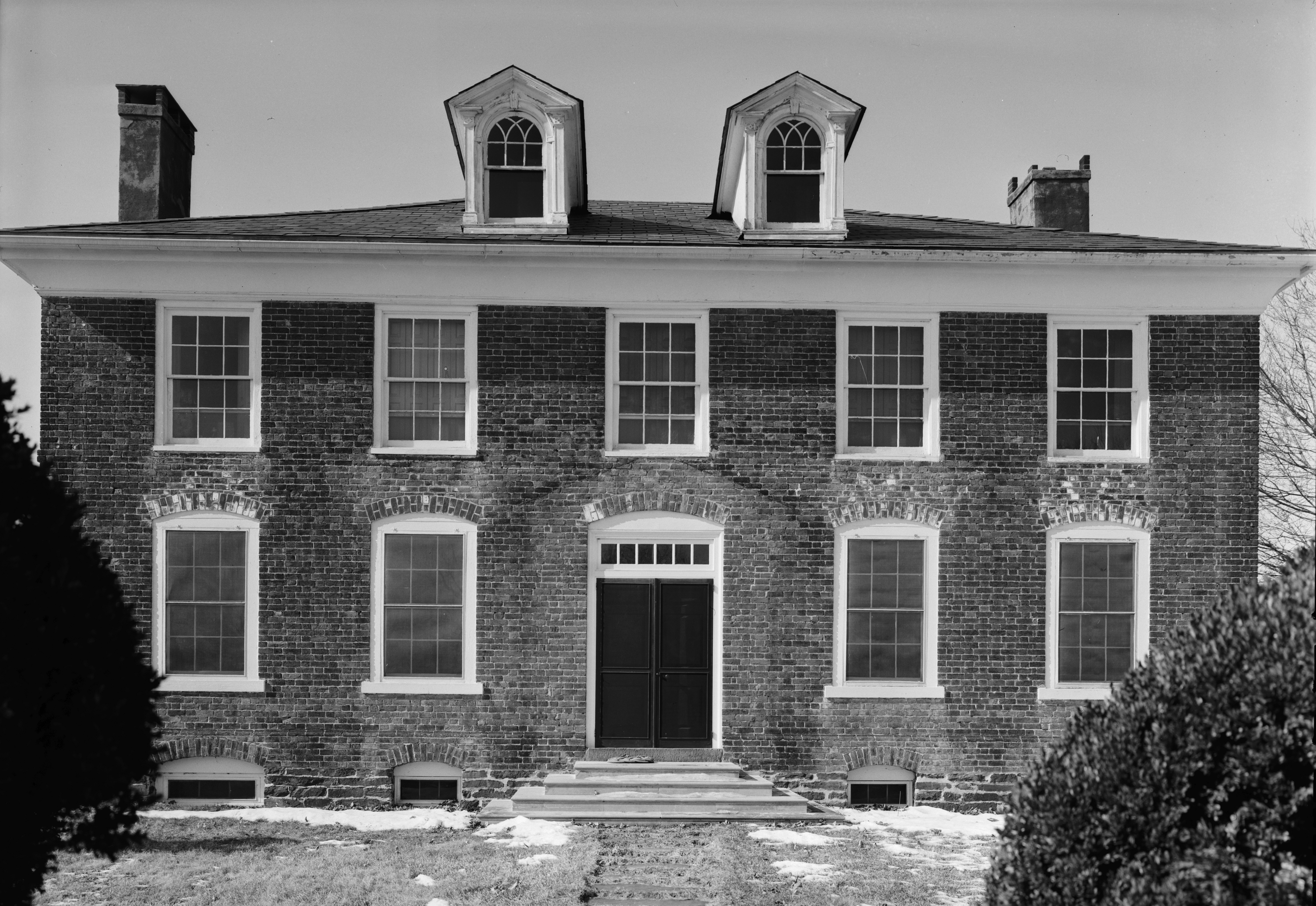
John Reading Farmstead, built 1760

The last meeting of the council under his administration was held at Trenton on 22 May 1758, on which occasion he signed warrants for the pay of the officials of the colony. Three weeks later, the Honorable Francis Bernard arrived from England with a commission as governor, and on 16 June he succeeded Reading in the post.

In the King's "Letter of Instructions" to Governor Bernard, the name of John Reading appears at the head of the council. Reading was still determined to retire from public life. On 28 July 1758, he waited upon Governor Bernard at Burlington, and informed him that "his great age and infirmities rendered him uncapable to perform the duty of one of his Majesty's Council and desired that his Excellency would be pleased to accept of his resignation and dismiss him from his Majesty's service." Governor Bernard "thanked him for his services, and promised him to represent the affairs of his Majesty's Council in order to obtain his approbation of such dismissal," and, with the unanimous consent of the council, "did suspend [excuse] him from the office and duty of a councillor of this colony, until his Majesty's pleasure be known." The King in due time accepted the resignation and appointed a successor.

On his release from public office, Reading retired to private life, in which he remained until his death on 5 November 1767. A communion service provided for in his will was later procured and presented to the Old Amwell Presbyterian Church, with which he was connected, and in whose burying-ground his body lies.

He was Catholic in his Sentiments, and loved good Men of every Denomination of Christians - He had a strict Regard to Truth, and was punctual to his Word - Was universally beloved, and died lamented on the Fifth Day of November last.
