= Richard Valentine Morris =

American politician

Member of the New York State Assembly from Westchester Co.
- In office July 1, 1813 – June 30, 1814
- Preceded by: Darius Crosby
- Succeeded by: William Requa

Personal details
- Born: March 8, 1768 Morrisania, Province of New York, British America
- Died: May 13, 1815 (aged 47) New York City, New York, United States
- Party: Federalist
- Spouse: Anne Walton (m. 1797)
- Children: 4
- Parent(s): Lewis Morris; Mary Walton

Military service
- Allegiance: United States
- Branch/service: United States Navy
- Years of service: 1798–1804
- Battles/wars: Quasi-War; First Barbary War

Richard Valentine Morris (March 8, 1768 – May 13, 1815) was a United States Navy officer and politician.

== Early life ==
He was born on March 8, 1768, in Morrisania, then a town in Westchester County, which became in 1898 a neighborhood in the borough of the Bronx, New York City. He was one of ten children born to Lewis Morris (1726–1798), a signer of the Declaration of Independence, and Mary Walton (1727–1794), a member of a well-known merchant family.

His uncles included Staats Long Morris, Richard Morris, the Chief Justice of the New York Supreme Court, and Gouverneur Morris, a United States Senator from New York. His grand-uncle was Robert Hunter Morris, a Chief Justice of the New Jersey Supreme Court, and his great-grandfather was Colonial Governor Lewis Morris. His aunt, Helena Magdalena Morris (1762–1840), was married to John Rutherfurd (1760–1840), a United States Senator from New Jersey who served from 1791 to 1798.

== Career ==
On June 7, 1798, he was appointed as Captain in command of Adams, during the Quasi-War with France and made several successful captures of French vessels. At the reduction of the US Navy after the war with France, Morris was retained as fifth in rank and recalled to command the Mediterranean Squadron in 1802 during the First Barbary War.

In command of Chesapeake, Morris led an unsuccessful blockade of Tripoli, mostly remaining in Gibraltar for the better part of 1803. Morris was relieved of duty and command of the squadron would turn over to Edward Preble in Constitution. Recalled to the United States, Morris faced a court of inquiry which decided that he had not "discovered due diligence and activity in annoying the enemy".

On May 16, 1804, Secretary of the Navy Robert Smith, with the agreement of President Thomas Jefferson, revoked his captaincy in the U.S. Navy and dismissed him from the service. Morris had brought his wife and young son on board with him and was accused of taking actions "more reflective of a concerned husband and father than a military commander in the midst of a war." In 1804, he published A Defence of the Conduct of Commodore Morris During His Command in the Mediterranean, as a defense to the actions he took while in command of the Mediterranean.

=== Political career ===
From July 1, 1813 until June 30, 1814, Morris was a Federalist member of the New York State Assembly (Westchester Co.), serving in the 37th New York State Legislature.

== Personal life ==
On January 24, 1797, Morris was married to Anne Walton (1773–1858). Together, they were the parents of:

- Lewis Morris (1797–1798), who died young.
- Gerard Walton Morris (1799–1865), who married Martha Pine in 1827.
- Richard Valentin Morris, Jr. (1803–1843), who died unmarried.
- Henry Morris (1805–1854), who married Mary Natalie Spencer (1810–1886), daughter of John Canfield Spencer, in 1831.

Morris died in May 1815 in New York City.
