= William Pinhorne =

American judge

Acting Governor of the Province of New Jersey
- In office April 1710 – June 10, 1710
- Preceded by: Richard Ingoldesby
- Succeeded by: Robert Hunter

President of the New Jersey Provincial Council
- In office June 16, 1709 – June 10, 1710
- Preceded by: Lewis Morris
- Succeeded by: Lewis Morris

Member of the New Jersey Provincial Council for the Eastern Division
- In office July 29, 1703 – June 15, 1713 (suspended)
- Preceded by: Office created
- Succeeded by: John Anderson

Personal details
- Born: England
- Died: c. 1720
- Spouse: Mary Ingoldesby
- Children: Mary Pinhorne, Martha Mompesson, John Pinhorne
- Occupation: Lawyer

William Pinhorne (died c. 1720) was an American colonial politician and jurist, who served in various capacities in both New York and New Jersey.

== Career ==
=== New York ===
William Pinhorne probably arrived in New York City from England in the 1670s. In May 1683 he purchased a house on Broadway. That year he was commissioned as Alderman for the East Ward of New York City. In 1685 he was Speaker of the New York General Assembly.

In 1691, with the accession of Governor Henry Sloughter, Pinhorne was appointed to the New York Provincial Council, where he served on the Committee for Preparing the Prosecution of Jacob Leisler. He then served as a judge in a special session of the Court of Oyer and Terminer which convened to try Leisler on charges of treason. Leisler was convicted, sentenced to death, and executed.

On May 15, 1691, William Pinhorne was appointed Fourth Justice on the New York Supreme Court of Judicature. In 1692 he moved to a plantation of over 1,000 acres (400 ha) at Snake Hill in East Jersey, which resulted in his suspension on September 1 from his positions for non-residence. Returning to New York the following year, he was appointed Second Justice of the New York Supreme Court of Judicature on March 22, 1693, and on June 10 he was restored to the Council.

On June 7, 1698, Lord Bellomont took office as governor, and Pinhorne was stripped of all New York offices for a remark made nearly a decade earlier which Bellomont interpreted as being in support of Jacobitism, and for "harbouring and entertaining one Smith a Jesuit in his house."

=== New Jersey ===
In 1698 William Pinhorne was appointed one of the East New Jersey Provincial Council during the administration of Governor Jeremiah Basse; he held the position up through the surrender of government to the Crown.

After the late 1690s the government of East and West Jersey became increasingly dysfunctional. This ultimately resulted in the surrender by the Proprietors of East Jersey and those of West Jersey of the right of government to Queen Anne. Anne's government united the two colonies as the Province of New Jersey, a royal colony, establishing a new system of government.

On July 29, 1703, in the instructions to Governor Viscount Cornbury Pinhorne was appointed to the New Jersey Provincial Council, and would serve through the administrations of several governors.

In 1704 Cornbury named him Second Justice of the Supreme Court. The Chief Justice Roger Mompesson, was Pinhorne's son in law.

Lord Lovelace, Cornbury's successor as governor, died on May 6, 1709. Lieutenant Governor Richard Ingoldesby became acting governor, and on June 16 suspended Lewis Morris, President of Council. William Pinhorne, being next in precedence, became president. Unbeknownst to Ingoldesby, his own commission as lieutenant governor was revoked in October 1709, but the news only reached him in April 1710. Pinhorne, as President of Council, became acting governor until June 10, 1710, when Governor Robert Hunter took office.

Pinhorne and Hunter soon found themselves in opposition to each other, with Hunter demanding Pinhorne's removal from all offices in New Jersey in 1711. Hunter continued lobbying London for the replacement of Pinhorne and other Councillors, and on April 23, 1713 the Lords of Trade wrote to Hunter that the crown had approved the appointment of new councilors.

William Pinhorne died in early 1720.

== Family ==
William Pinhorne married Mary, a daughter of Lieutenant Governor Richard Ingoldesby. A daughter, Martha, was the wife of Chief Justice Roger Mompesson of the New Jersey Supreme Court. Pinhorne had another daughter, Mary, and a son, John.
