= Lewis Morris (speaker) =

American judge and politician (1698–1762)

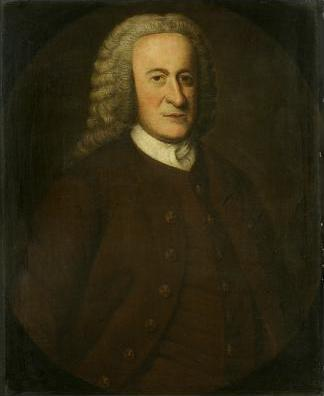
- Morris c. 1760

Speaker of the New York General Assembly
- In office June 15, 1737 – October 20, 1738
- Preceded by: Adolphus Philipse
- Succeeded by: Adolphus Philipse

Member of the New York General Assembly
- In office 1732–1750

Personal details
- Born: September 3, 1698 Morrisania, Province of New York, British America
- Died: July 7, 1762 (aged 63) Morrisania, Province of New York, British America
- Spouse(s): Catherine Staats (died 1731) Sarah Gouverneur (m. 1746)
- Relations: Robert Hunter Morris (brother); James Graham (grandfather)
- Children: Mary Morris Lawrence; Lewis Morris; Staats Long Morris; Richard Morris; Gouverneur Morris; Euphemia Morris Ogden
- Parent(s): Lewis Morris; Isabella Graham Morris

Lewis Morris Jr. (September 23, 1698 – July 3, 1762) was an American judge, politician and landowner who served as speaker of the New York General Assembly from 1737 to 1738.

== Early life ==
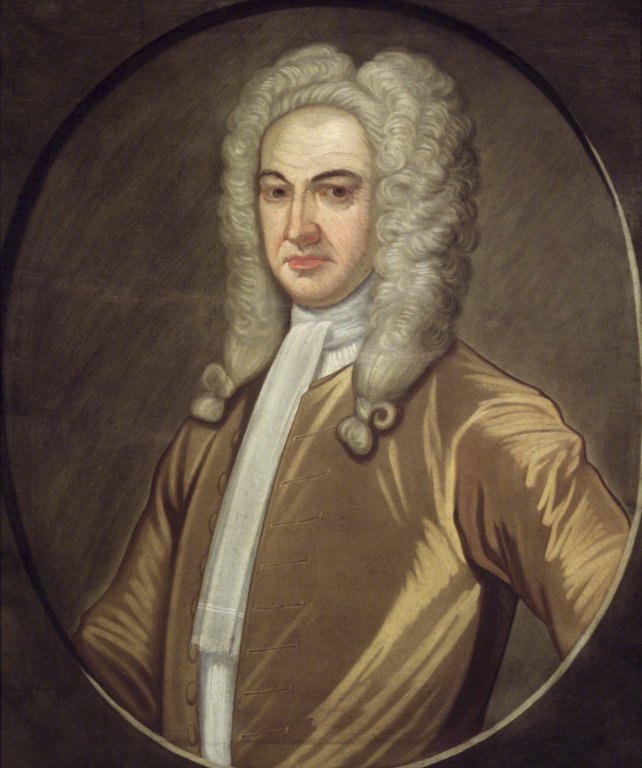
Morris' father, Governor Lewis Morris

Morris was born on September 23, 1698, at Morrisania, his family's manor in the southwest section of today's Bronx. He was the eldest son of Lewis Morris (1671–1746) and Isabella (née Graham) Morris (1673–1752). His younger brother was Robert Hunter Morris, who served as the deputy governor of New Jersey. His father was very prominent in public life and variously served as Chief Justice of New York and as the 8th Colonial Governor of New Jersey.

His paternal grandparents were Sarah (née Pole) Morris and Richard Morris, who was originally from Monmouthshire, Wales. His grandparents bought Morrisania from Samuel Edsall in 1670 and moved there from Barbados. His mother was the eldest daughter of James Graham, who served as the first Speaker of the New York General Assembly and the first Recorder of New York City. Graham, who was born in Midlothian, Scotland, was a grandson of James Graham, 1st Marquess of Montrose.

== Career ==
Upon his father's death in 1746, he inherited the manor, becoming the 2nd Lord of the Manor of Morrisania which eventually became over 2,000 acres. He also owned between forty and sixty slaves. Lewis is considered "representative of those colonial-born politicians who came to dominate public life in eighteenth-century British America, during a time of frenetic colonial economic and demographic growth."

Morris served as Judge of the High Court of the Admiralty of New York from 1738 until his death, with jurisdiction over New Jersey and Connecticut, and Judge of the Court of Oyer and Terminer. During his twenty-four year tenure as New York's vice-admiralty judge, he personally condemned more than 260 prize ships captured by colonial privateers, worth over £2 million.

In 1722, he became a member of Governor William Burnet's council. From 1732 to 1750, he represented Westchester County (which today is Westchester and Bronx counties) in the New York General Assembly. He served alongside his father in the Assembly. In 1737, was chosen to succeed Adolphus Philipse as Speaker of the New York General Assembly, in which he served until 1738. While speaker, he replaced virtually all of the judicial and militia officers in Westchester.

== Personal life ==
Morris was twice married. His first wife was Katrintje "Catherine" Staats (1697–1731), a daughter of New York surgeon, Samuel Staats. Her paternal grandfather was Abraham Staats, one of the first settlers of the New Netherland colonies. Together, they were the parents of:

- Mary Morris (1723–1804), who married Thomas Lawrence, Esq., a son of Thomas Lawrence, mayor of Philadelphia.
- Lewis Morris (1726–1798), a signer of the Declaration of Independence who married Mary Walton.
- Staats Long Morris (1728–1800), a Loyalist who served as a Member of Parliament during the Revolutionary War who married Lady Catherine, Duchess of Gordon, widow of Cosmo Gordon, 3rd Duke of Gordon and daughter of William Gordon, 2nd Earl of Aberdeen, in 1756. After her death in 1779, he married Jane Urquhart (1749–1801) in 1780. (Note: Staats Long Morris (1728–1800) is likely the only American buried in Westminster Abbey. His grave is in the north aisle of the nave.)
- Richard Morris (1730–1800), a prominent judge who married Sarah Ludlow in 1759.

After his first wife died in 1731, he married Sarah Gouverneur (1714–1786), a daughter of Isaac Gouverneur and Sarah (née Staats) Gouverneur. Sarah was a niece of Speaker Abraham Gouverneur (who married Mary Leisler, daughter of Jacob Leisler and the widow of Jacob Milborne). Together, they were the parents of:

- Isabella Morris (c. 1746–1830), who in 1762 married Rev. Isaac Wilkins, who represented Shelburne township in the Nova Scotia House of Assembly from 1785 to 1793. They were the parents of Lewis Morris Wilkins.
- Gouverneur Morris (1752–1816), a U.S. Senator and U.S. Minister to France who married Anne Cary Randolph, a daughter of Thomas Mann Randolph of Virginia.
- Euphemia Morris (1754–1818), who married Samuel Ogden, the brother Abraham Ogden, in 1775.

After several years of declining health, Morris died at Morrisania on July 3, 1762. After his death, Governor Robert Monckton appointed his son Richard to his place on the New York Court of Vice-Admiralty.

== Gallery ==
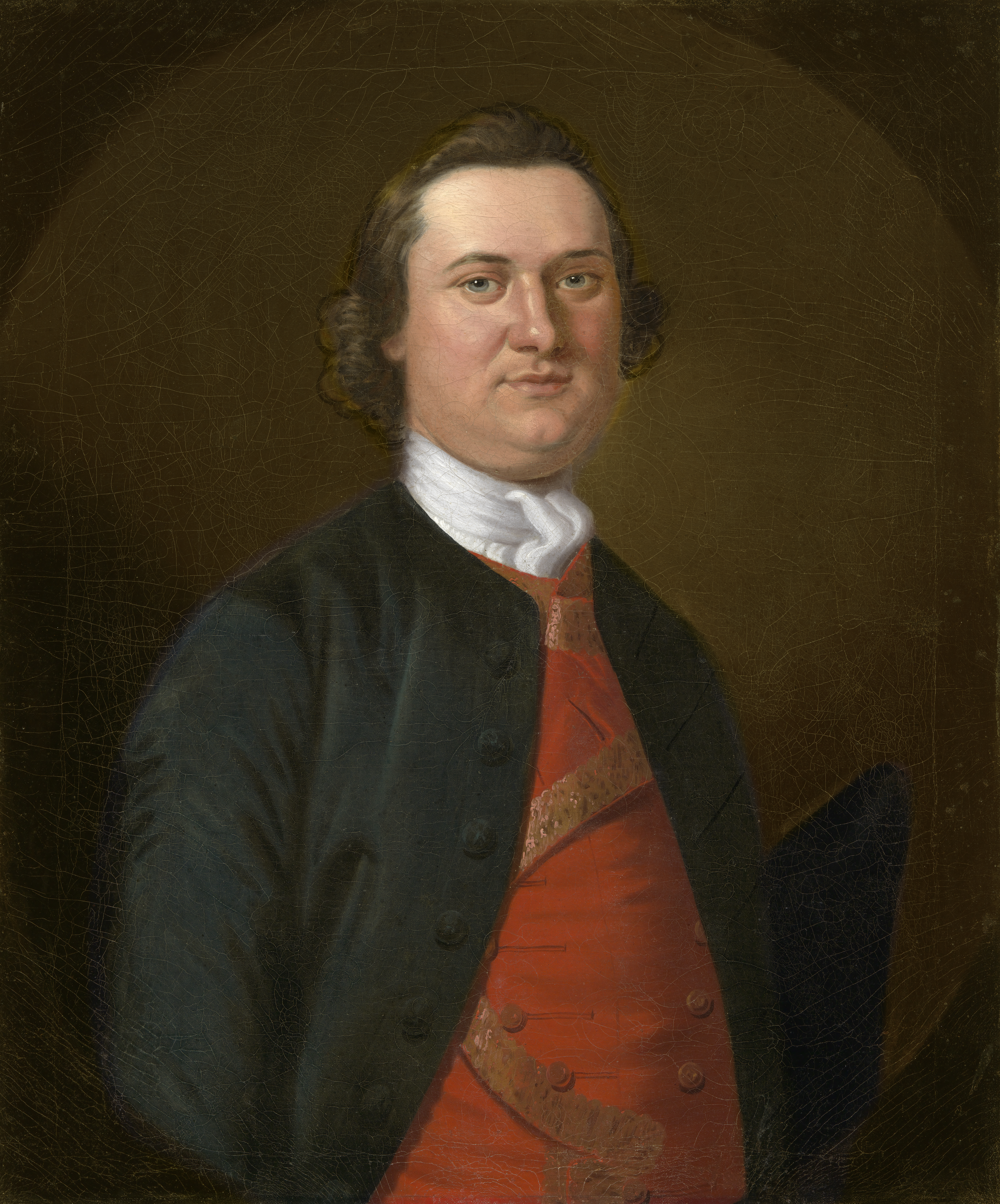
Portrait of his son, Lewis Morris, by John Wollaston

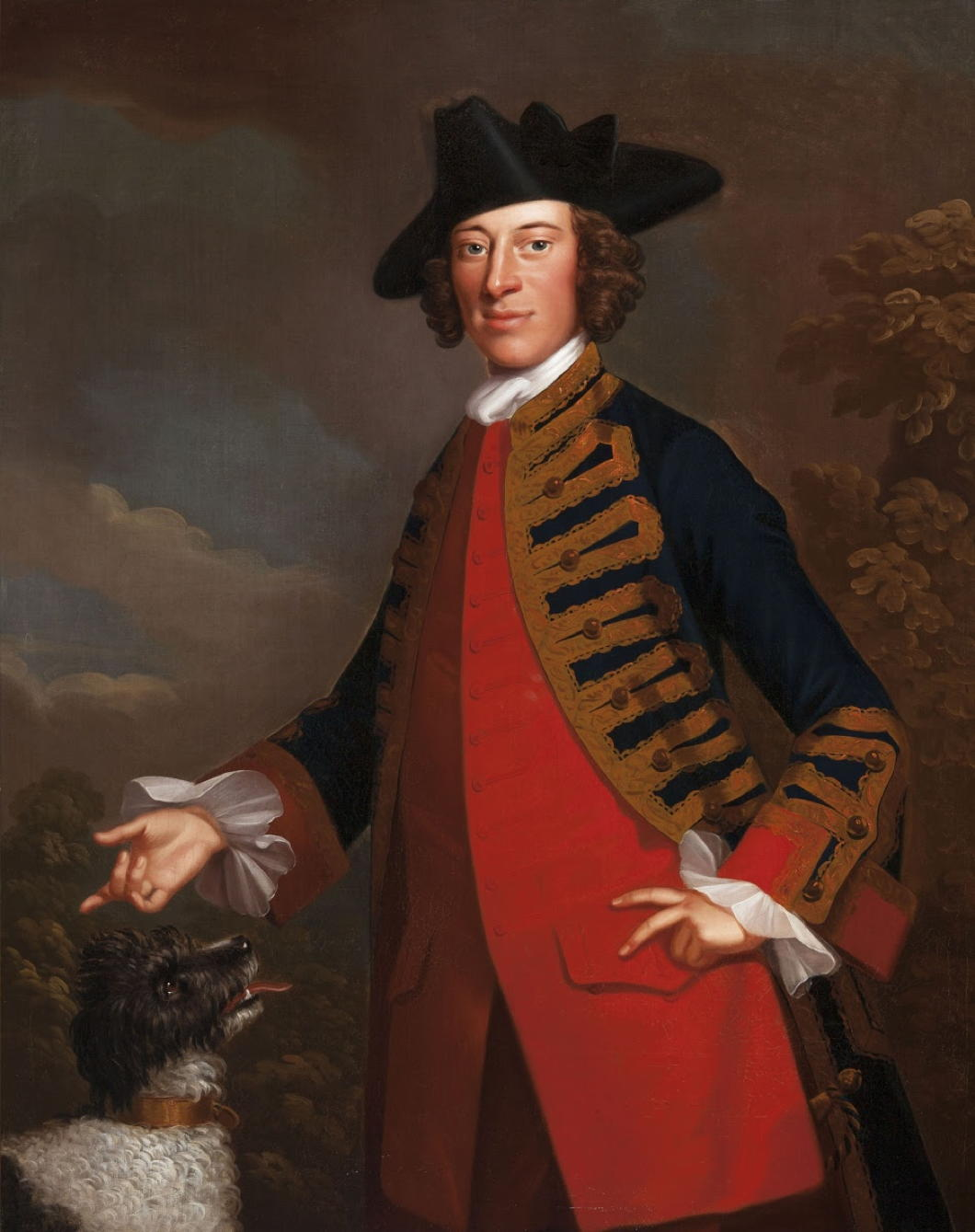
Portrait of his son, Staats Long Morris, by John Wollaston

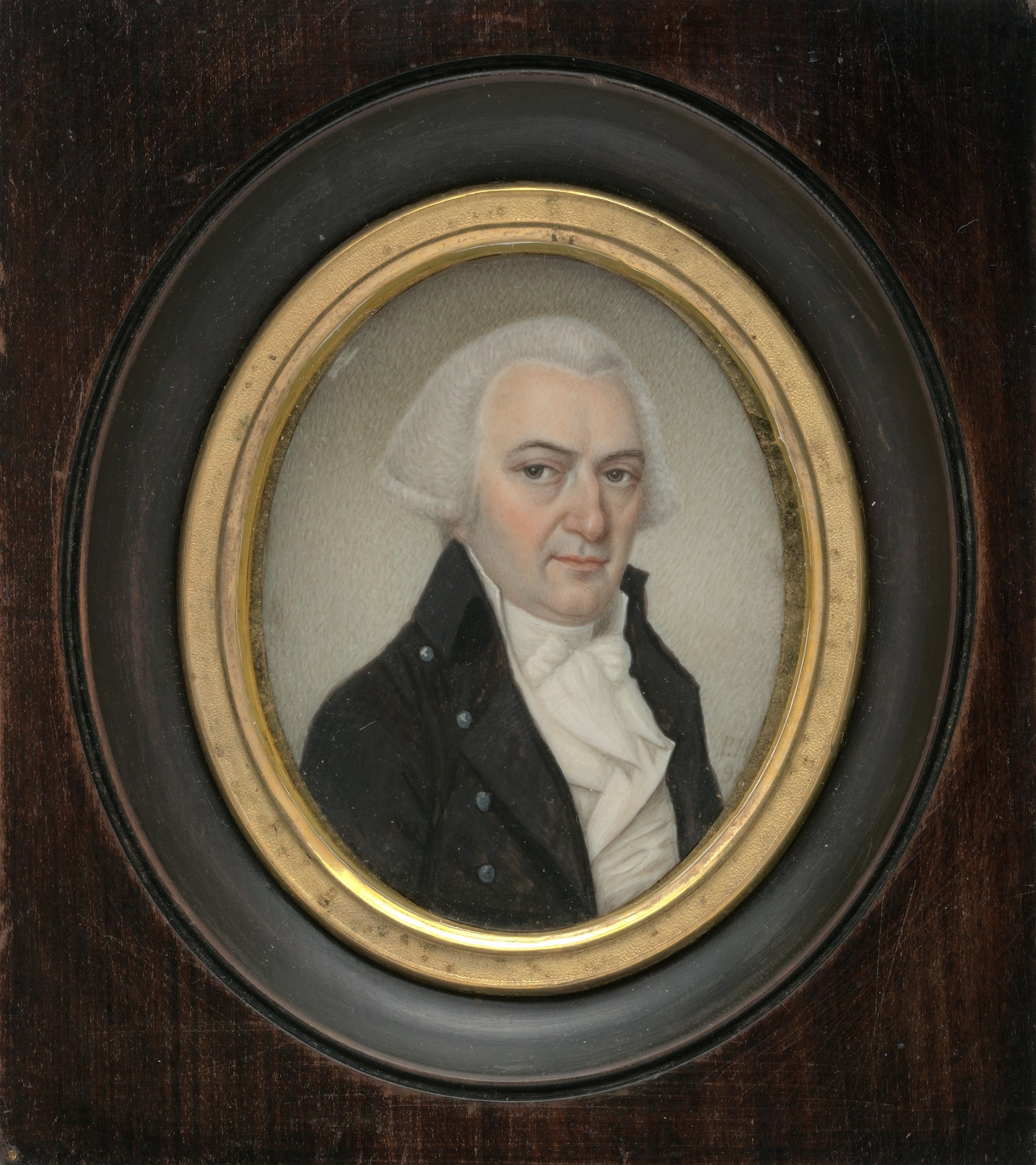
Portrait of his son, Gouverneur Morris, by Pierre Henri

Coat of Arms of the Morris family
