= John Hamilton (New Jersey politician) =

American politician

President of the New Jersey Provincial Council
- In office 1736–1747
- Preceded by: John Anderson
- Succeeded by: John Reading

Member of the New Jersey Provincial Council for the Western Division
- In office June 15, 1713 – 1747

Personal details
- Born: c. 1681
- Died: 1747 Perth Amboy, Middlesex County, Province of New Jersey
- Resting place: Perth Amboy
- Spouse: Elizabeth de Peyster
- Children: Stephen Hamilton

John Hamilton (c. 1681–1747) was an American politician from the colonial period who served as acting governor of the Province of New Jersey from 1736–1738, and from 1746–1747.

== Career ==
The son of Andrew Hamilton, proprietary governor of both East New Jersey and West New Jersey, John Hamilton was first appointed to the New Jersey Provincial Council on June 15, 1713 during the administration of Governor Robert Hunter. Although a resident of Perth Amboy, in the Eastern Division of the province, Hamilton was appointed to a Western Division seat. He remained on the council through the administrations of governors William Burnet, John Montgomerie, Sir William Cosby and Lewis Morris.

The senior councillor actually residing in New Jersey would, by virtue of his seniority, be president of council. Hamilton became president after the death of John Anderson on March 28, 1736. Anderson had been acting governor for 18 days, since the March 10 death of Governor Cosby; John Hamilton thus became acting governor, and served until 1738, when Governor Lewis Morris took office.

In 1735 John Hamilton was appointed an assistant judge of the New Jersey Supreme Court. In 1740 he was appointed a commissioner to settle the boundary between Rhode Island and Massachusetts. He was again acting governor after the death of Morris in 1746.

John Hamilton died in 1747 in Perth Amboy.

== See also ==
- List of colonial governors of New Jersey
