= James Graham (speaker) =

American politician (1650–1701)

Recorder of New York City
- In office 1693 – January 21, 1701
- Preceded by: William Pinhorne
- Succeeded by: Abraham Gouverneur
- In office 1683–c. 1689
- Preceded by: Inaugural holder
- Succeeded by: William Pinhorne

Speaker of the New York General Assembly
- In office March 2, 1699 – May 15, 1699
- Preceded by: Phillip French
- Succeeded by: Abraham Gouverneur
- In office June 20, 1695 – April 2, 1698
- Preceded by: Henry Pierson
- Succeeded by: Phillip French
- In office April 9, 1691 – November 16, 1693
- Preceded by: Inaugural holder
- Succeeded by: Henry Pierson

Personal details
- Born: c. 1650 Midlothian, Scotland
- Died: January 27, 1701 (aged 50–51) Morrisania, Province of New York, British America
- Relations: Marquess of Montrose (grandfather); Robert Hunter Morris (grandson)
- Children: 6
- Parent(s): John Graham; Isabella Affick Graham

James Graham (c. 1650 – January 27, 1701) was a Scottish born colonial American politician who served as the Speaker of the New York General Assembly.

== Early life ==
Graham was born in Midlothian, Scotland in about 1650 and was the son of John Graham and Isabella (née Affick) Graham. His paternal grandfather was Scottish nobleman James Graham, 1st Marquess of Montrose, who supported King Charles I in the English Civil War, and was executed in Scotland in May 1650 after which the Montrose estates were forfeited. His father's older brother, James Graham, 2nd Marquess of Montrose, succeeded to the title after his grandfather's death.

== Career ==
In 1678, as a member of the entourage of Governor Edmund Andros (who was appointed by the Duke of York to be the first proprietary governor of the Province of New York in October 1674), Graham sailed to New York aboard the Blossom. Once in British America, he became a merchant and practiced law. He was granted patents to large tracts of land in Ulster County, Staten Island, and New Jersey.

From its inception in 1683, until c. 1689, Graham served as the first recorder of New York City, essentially the deputy mayor of New York City (under mayors Cornelius Van Steenwyk, Gabriel Minvielle, Nicholas Bayard, Stephanus Van Cortlandt and Peter Delanoy).

On December 10, 1685, while serving as Recorder, Graham was appointed the Attorney General of the Province of New York to succeed Thomas Rudyard. In 1687, he was appointed to the Governor's Council under Governor Thomas Dongan, 2nd Earl of Limerick. In 1688 when New York was annexed into Dominion of New England, he moved to Boston and became the Attorney General of the Dominion. Following its collapse in April 1689, he was imprisoned along with Governor Andros and was exiled to England.

=== Return to New York ===
In 1691, Graham returned to New York after the Leisler Rebellion was put down by Governor Henry Sloughter, and was elected as a member of the New York General Assembly (the first representative governing body in New York), representing New York County (the current New York County, Manhattan), from 1691 to 1693 and again from 1695 until his death in 1701. From 1691 to 1694 and again from 1695 to 1698, he served as the Speaker of the Assembly.

In April 1691, Thomas Newton, then the Attorney General of the Province, left New York and George Farewell was appointed to succeed him but the General Assembly considered Farewell incompetent and, in May 1691, Graham was again appointed Attorney General, which he held until January 1701. In 1696, he was appointed Advocate General of the Court of Vice-Admiralty and in May 1699, he was again appointed to the Governor's Council under Governor Richard Coote, 1st Earl of Bellomont.

He was appointed to serve as Recorder again in 1693 and served (under mayors Charles Lodwik, William Merritt, Johannes de Peyster, David Provost, and Isaac De Riemer) until 1700 when he "lost favor" with Governor Bellomont and was replaced in January 1701 by Abraham Gouverneur.

== Personal life ==
Graham was first married to Mary Home. Together, they were the parents of:

- Isabella Graham (1673–1752), who married Gov. Lewis Morris (1671–1746) on November 3, 1691.
- Mary Graham (b. c. 1675), who married John Corbett on December 14, 1703.
- Sarah Graham (b. c. 1677), who married Mr. Chappel, emigrated to England and was the mother of Rev. Graham Chappen, a clergyman in Nottinghamshire.
- Margaret Graham (b. c. 1679)
- John Graham (b. c. 1681)

After Mary's death, Graham was married for a second time to Elizabeth Windebank (1655–1701) on July 18, 1684. Together, they were the parents of:

- Augustine Graham (d. 1718), who married Jane Chiswell on April 8, 1703. He served as Surveyor General (from 1691 to 1719) and was a patentee in the Great and Little Nine Partner grants in Dutchess County.

Graham died at his daughters residence, Morrisania, on January 27, 1701.

=== Descendants ===
Through his son Augustine, he was the grandfather of James Graham, who married his cousin (and James's granddaughter) Arabella Morris in 1738. Through his daughter Isabella, he was the grandfather of twelve, including fellow Speaker Lewis Morris Jr. and New Jersey Chief Justice Robert Hunter Morris.
