= Judge Morris =

Judge Morris may refer to:

- Brian Morris (judge) (born 1963), judge of the United States District Court for the District of Montana
- Buckner Stith Morris (1800–1879), judge of the Lake County Circuit Court in Illinois
- Charles Morris (1731–1802), Canadian probate court judge
- Charles E. Morris (1814–1902), Wisconsin state court judge
- George Franklin Morris (1866–1953), judge of the United States District Court for the District of New Hampshire
- Hugh M. Morris (1878–1966), judge of the United States District Court for the District of Delaware
- James Ward Morris (1890–1960), judge of the United States District Court for the District of Columbia
- Joseph Wilson Morris (1922–2021), judge of the United States District Court for the Eastern District of Oklahoma
- Logan Morris (1889–1977), judge of the United States Board of Tax Appeals
- Naomi E. Morris (1921–1986), judge of the North Carolina Court of Appeals
- Page Morris (1853–1924), judge of the United States District Court for the District of Minnesota
- Robert Morris (judge) (1745–1815), judge of the United States District Courts for the District of New Jersey, and the Eastern and Western Districts of New Jersey
- Thomas John Morris (1837–1912), judge of the United States District Court for the District of Maryland

== See also ==
- Justice Morris (disambiguation)
