= Governor Anderson =

Governor Anderson may refer to:

- C. Elmer Anderson (1912–1998), 28th Governor of Minnesota
- Charles Anderson (governor) (1814–1895), 27th Governor of Ohio
- Forrest H. Anderson (1913–1989), 17th Governor of Montana
- George William Anderson (1791–1857), 10th Governor of British Ceylon
- Hugh J. Anderson (1801–1881), 20th Governor of Maine
- John Anderson (colonial administrator) (1858–1918), 22nd Governor of British Ceylon and 16th Governor of Straits Settlements
- John Anderson Jr. (1917–2014), 36th Governor of Kansas
- John Anderson (New Jersey politician) (1665–1736), Acting Royal Governor of New Jersey
- John Anderson, 1st Viscount Waverley (1882–1958), Governor of Bengal from 1932 to 1937
- Kenneth Anderson (British Army officer) (1891–1959), Governor of Gibraltar
- Sigurd Anderson (1904–1990), 19th Governor of South Dakota
- Victor Anderson (Nebraska politician) (1902–1962), 28th Governor of Nebraska
- Wendell R. Anderson (1933–2016), 33rd Governor of Minnesota

== See also ==
- Elmer L. Andersen (1909–2004), 30th Governor of Minnesota
