= Androboros =

1715 play by Robert Hunter

Androboros is a play by Robert Hunter written in 1715 when Hunter was serving as the colonial governor of New York and New Jersey. It survives as the earliest known play ever written and published in the North American British colonies. The only surviving copy is currently held in the collections of the Huntington Library in San Marino, California.

The play is a three-act tragicomedy that ridicules Hunter's political enemies with lightly veiled characters corresponding to many important political figures in early New York, including the Rev. William Vesey, Adolphe Philipse, Thomas Smithfield, and Lewis Morris. The story takes place in a hidden room in the basement of the governor's mansion where a secret society meets plotting to take over the colony. Several characters, led by Adolphe Philipse, are duped into dressing like women to seduce the governor general and kidnap him. When they are found out, the seditious plotters are exposed and run out of town.
