= William Trent House =

- William Trent House Museum
- U.S. National Register of Historic Places
- U.S. National Historic Landmark
- New Jersey Register of Historic Places
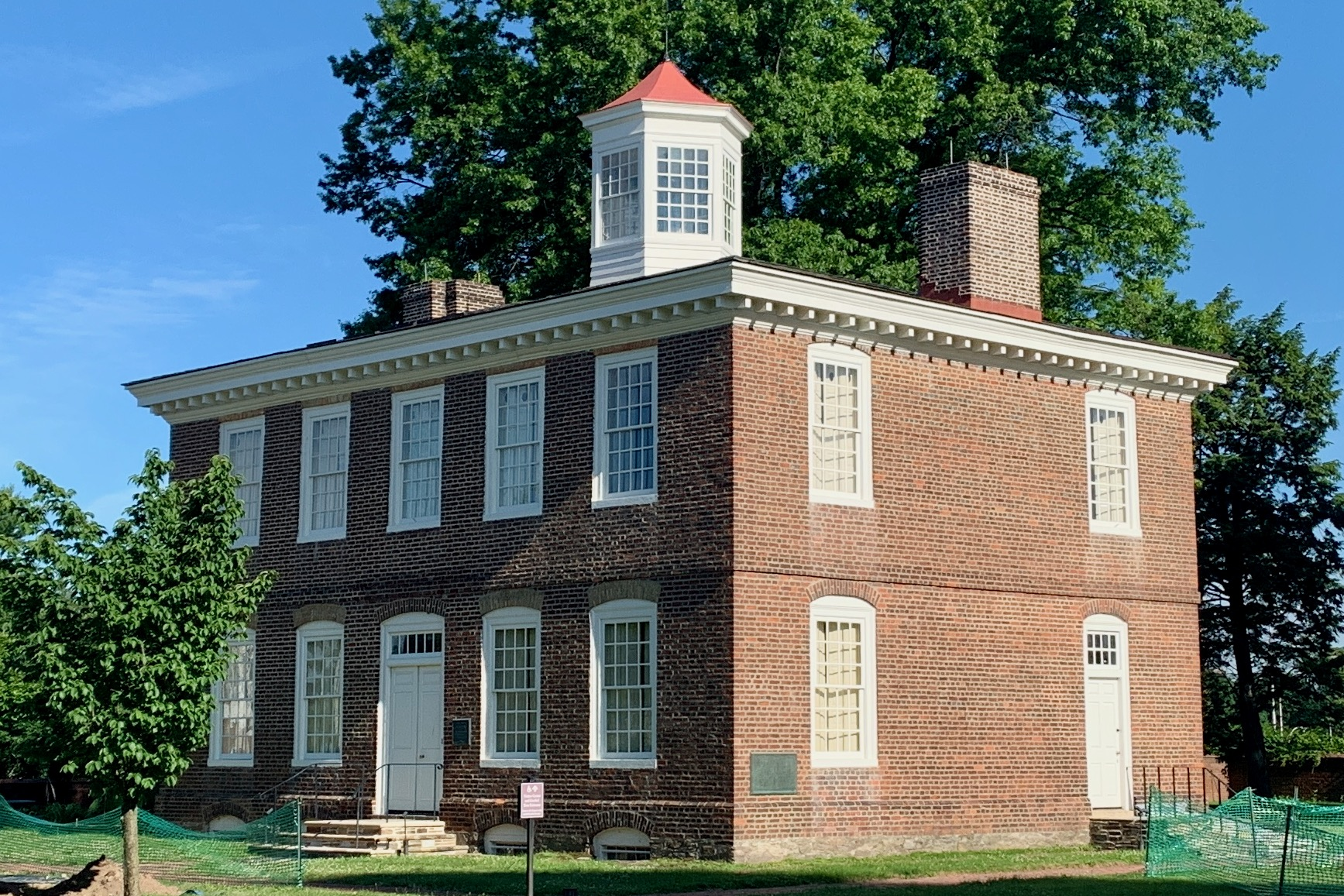
- William Trent House in 2019

- Location within Mercer County, New Jersey Location within New Jersey Location within the United States
- Location: 15 Market Street, Trenton, New Jersey
- Coordinates: 40°12′45.7″N 74°45′57.7″W
- Area: 5.2 acres (2.1 ha)
- Built: 1719
- Architectural style: Georgian
- NRHP reference No.: 70000388
- NJRHP No.: 1799

Significant dates
- Added to NRHP: April 15, 1970
- Designated NHL: April 15, 1970
- Designated NJRHP: May 27, 1971

The William Trent House is a historic building located at 15 Market Street in Trenton, Mercer County, New Jersey. It was built in 1719 for William Trent and is the oldest building in Trenton. He founded the eponymous town, which became the capital of New Jersey. It has served as the residence for three Governors. The house was added to the National Register of Historic Places and listed as a National Historic Landmark on April 15, 1970, for its significance as an example of Early Georgian Colonial architecture.

== Description ==
The William Trent House stands just south of downtown Trenton, on a landscaped parcel about 2 acres in size which is ringed in part by brick walls and stone and iron fencing. The lot is bounded by Market Street, an exit ramp of New Jersey Route 29, William Trent Place, and a parking lot serving the adjacent judicial facility. The house is a 2-1/2 story brick building, with a five-bay front facade and a hip roof crowned by a central cupola. Most windows are set in segmented-arch openings, with some butting against the dentillated cornice below the roof. The main entrance, a double door with a six-light transom window, is also set in a segmented-arch opening. The interior follows a central hall plan, with four chambers on each floor. Original surviving features include the main staircase, the floors and original woodwork in several rooms.[5]

== History ==
The William Trent House is located at what was known in early colonial times as the Falls of the Delaware and prior to English colonization had been the site of Lenni Lenape settlements for thousands of years. The first European colonist in the area was Mahlon Stacy, a Quaker immigrant from England, who built a home on the site circa 1680. After his death, Stacy’s son sold 800 acres to William Trent, a wealthy shipping merchant based in Philadelphia, in 1714. Trent added property to include virtually all of what is now the city of Trenton.

William Trent built his country home north of Philadelphia, in what was known as West Jersey, on these lands about 1719. It was a large, imposing brick structure, built in the newest fashion. An “allee” of English cherry trees led from the entrance down to the ferry landing. Nearby, there were numerous outbuildings as well as grist, saw, and fulling mills along the Assunpink Creek. In 1720 Trent laid out a settlement, which he incorporated and named “Trent Town.” By 1721 he and his family made the House their full-time residence until his death in 1724.

The house had numerous private owners including three Governors who used the house as a Governor’s mansion – Lewis Morris, Philemon Dickerson and Rodman McCamley Price. The house was home to two men during the Revolution, Dr. William Bryant and Colonel John Cox.

In 1929, the house was given to the city by Edward A. Stokes, with the caveat that it be restored to its original appearance and that it be used as a museum, library or art gallery. Restoration work took place between 1934 and 1936. The house was dedicated as a museum in 1936 and opened in 1939.

== Gallery ==
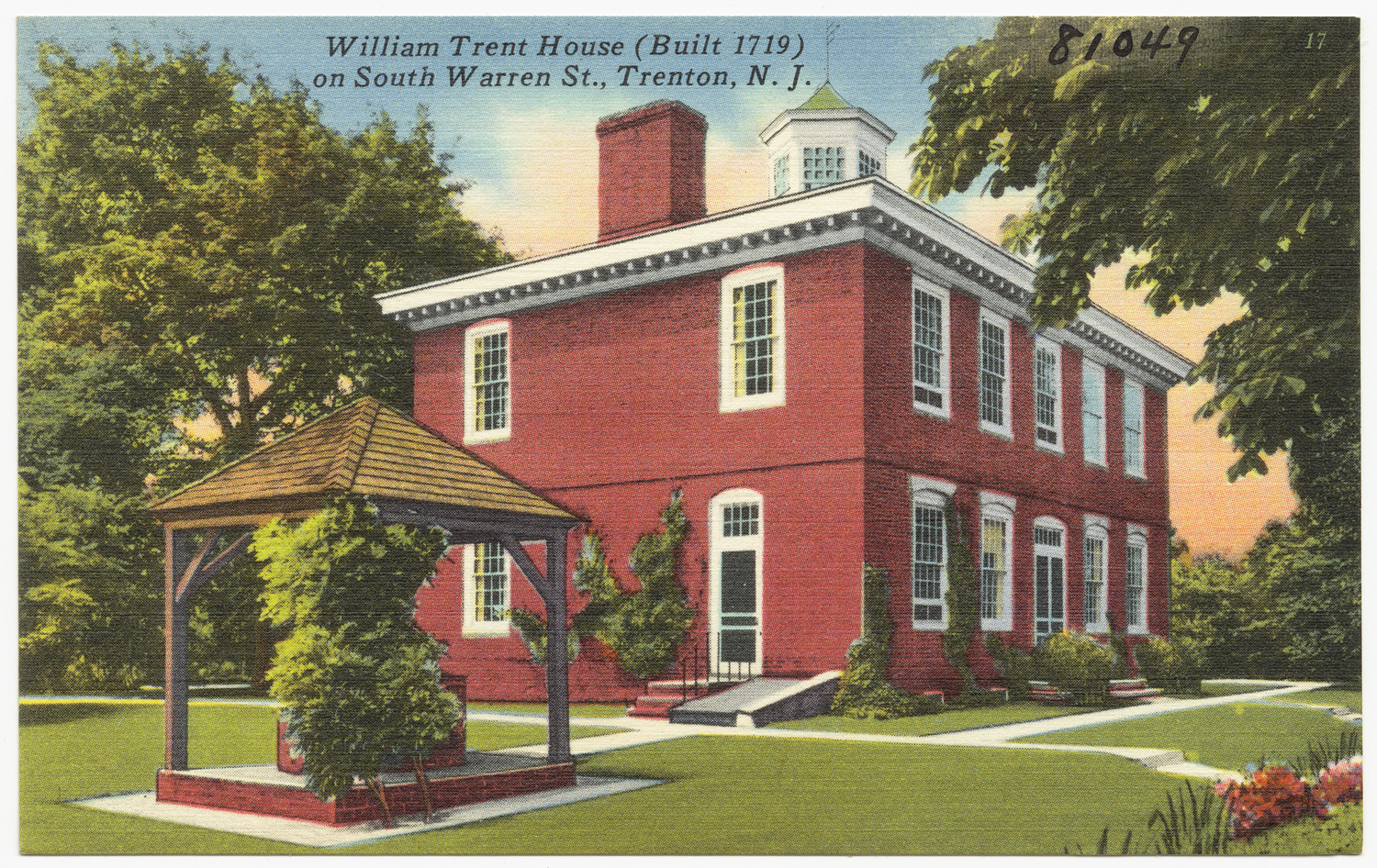
Postcard showing the house, and the gazebo

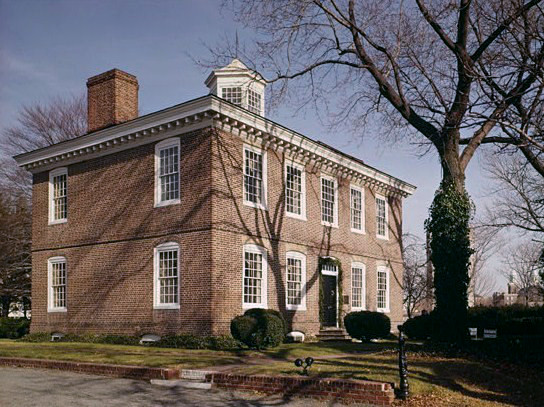
Historic American Buildings Survey photograph

== See also ==
- List of National Historic Landmarks in New Jersey
- National Register of Historic Places listings in Mercer County, New Jersey
- List of the oldest buildings in New Jersey
- List of museums in New Jersey
