= William Trent (Trenton) =

American judge (c.1653–1724)

Speaker of the New Jersey General Assembly
- In office 1723 – December 25, 1724
- Governor: William Burnet
- Preceded by: John Johnstone
- Succeeded by: John Johnstone

Member of the New Jersey General Assembly from the Burlington County district
- In office 1721 – December 25, 1724 Serving with Thomas Lambert

Chief Justice of the New Jersey Supreme Court
- In office November 23, 1723 – December 25, 1724
- Preceded by: David Jamison
- Succeeded by: Robert Lettis Hooper

Personal details
- Born: c. 1653 Inverness, Scotland
- Died: December 25, 1724 Trenton, New Jersey
- Resting place: Friends' burying-ground, Trenton
- Spouse(s): Mary Burdge; Mary Coddington
- Children: James, John, Maurice, Mary, Thomas, William
- Occupation: Merchant

William Trent (c. 1653 – December 25, 1724) was a trader and merchant in Pennsylvania and New Jersey around the beginning of the 18th century, after whom the capital of New Jersey, Trenton, was named. Little detail is known of his early life, including exactly when he was born.

== Early life and education ==
He emigrated to the North American colonies with his brother James in the 1690s.

== Career ==
By 1693, Trent had immigrated with his brother James to the British colonies, and settled in Philadelphia. As a merchant trader, he became quite wealthy, eventually being one of the most affluent men in the city. He had extensive trading interests in furs, goods, and slaves, with contacts/clients in the colonies, Caribbean colonies and England. He owned an interest in more than 40 ships, exporting such products as tobacco, flour and furs while importing wine, rum, molasses and dry goods. He also imported indentured servants from the British Isles, and African and West Indian slaves from Africa and the Caribbean. Trent became one of the wealthiest men in Philadelphia.

Politically active, he was appointed to the Pennsylvania Provincial Council from 1704 to act as an adviser to the governor (the council was similar to the contemporary governor's cabinet). He was appointed to the Supreme Court of Pennsylvania. After being elected to the Assembly, Trent was elected as its Speaker.

== Marriage and family ==
Trent was believed to have married Mary Burge (d. 1708) soon after his arrival in Philadelphia. They had four children together: James (named for his father), John, Maurice and Mary.

After his wife's death in 1708, Trent remarried, to Mary Coddington. They had two sons together: Thomas, who died in infancy; and William Trent, born in 1715/1718, who survived to adulthood. It is this younger William Trent who is accused of being involved in giving smallpox infected blankets to Delaware emissaries during negotiations surrounding the siege of Fort Pitt.

== Later years ==
In 1719, Trent built a country house below the falls of the Delaware River in central New Jersey. He platted a town or settlement around his house, which came to be known as Trent's Town, and later Trenton. It became the state capital. After his move, he became active in New Jersey politics, being elected to its Assembly and appointed as chief justice.

During the American Revolutionary War, his house was used by Hessian officers fighting for the British. In the Battle of Trenton, it was attacked by Continental Army troops.

After Trenton was designated as the state capital, the Trent House was used as the governor's mansion for many years.

William Trent died on December 25, 1724. Three slaves were arrested and hanged in 1737 for allegedly poisoning him.

== Legacy and honors ==
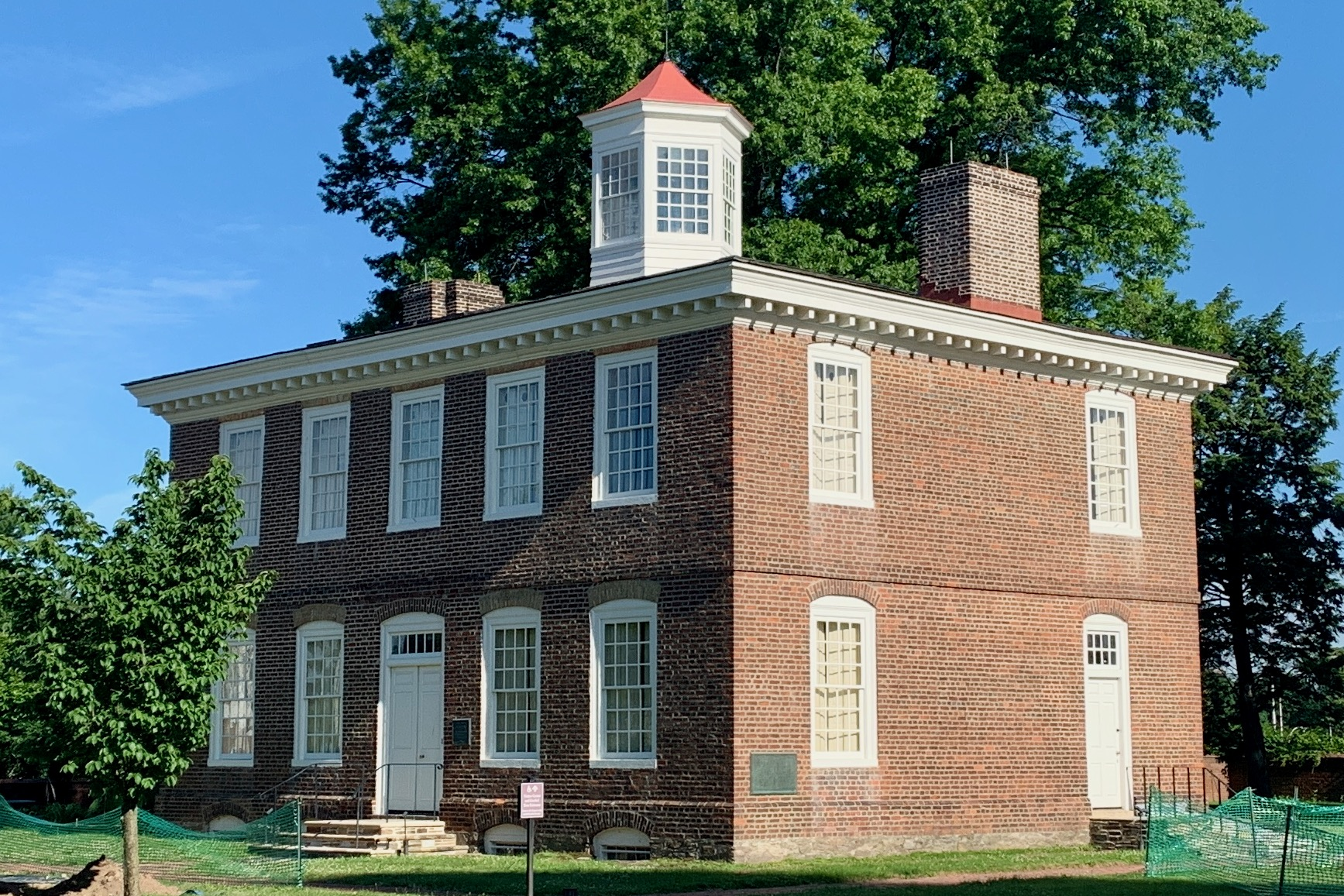
William Trent House in 2019

- The William Trent House is on the state and national registers for historic places, and is a National Historic Landmark. It is operated as a house museum in Trenton.
