= Richard Morris (New York judge) =

American judge and politician (1730–1810)

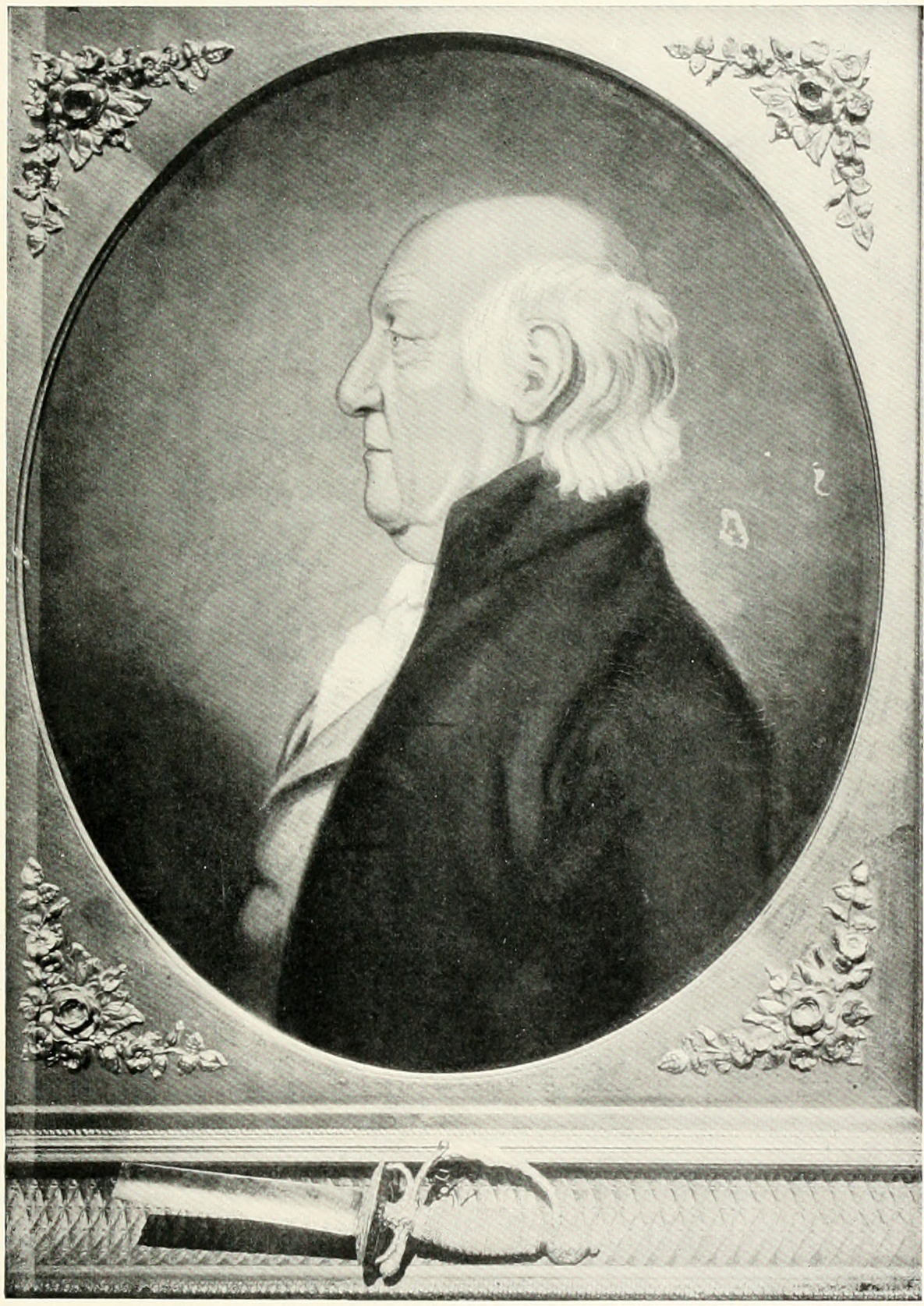

Chief Justice of the New York Supreme Court
- In office 1779–1790
- Preceded by: John Jay
- Succeeded by: Robert Yates

Member of the New York State Senate
- In office March 4, 1778 – October 23, 1779
- Preceded by: John Jones
- Succeeded by: Stephen Ward

Personal details
- Born: August 15, 1730 Morrisania, Province of New York, British America
- Died: April 11, 1810 (aged 79) Scarsdale, New York, New York, United States
- Spouse: Sarah Ludlow (m. 1759; died 1791)
- Children: 5, including Lewis Richard Morris
- Parent(s): Lewis Morris; Katrintje Staats
- Education: Yale University

Richard Morris (August 15, 1730 O.S. – April 11, 1810) was an American lawyer and politician from New York. He was chief justice of the New York Supreme Court from 1779 to 1790.

== Early life ==
He was born on August 15, 1730, in Morrisania, then located in Westchester County, New York, the third son of Lewis Morris (1698–1762) and Katrintje "Catherine" (née Staats) Morris (1697–1731).

His paternal grandfather was Governor of New Jersey Lewis Morris. His brothers included Continental Congressman Lewis Morris and Gen. Staats Long Morris. His half-brother was U.S. Senator Gouverneur Morris and Assemblyman Richard Valentine Morris was his nephew.

Morris was a graduate of Yale College in 1748. Then he studied law, and was admitted to the bar in 1752.

== Career ==
In 1762, he was appointed by Governor Robert Monckton to the New York Court of Vice-Admiralty. At the outbreak of the American Revolutionary War he sided with the Patriots, and resigned from the bench in 1775.

On March 4, 1778, he was appointed by the New York State Assembly to the New York State Senate as one of the representatives of the Southern District, to fill the vacancy caused by the resignation of Dr. John Jones. He remained in the State Senate until October 1779, sitting in the 1st, 2nd and 3rd New York State Legislatures.

On October 23, 1779, he was appointed by the Council of Appointment as Chief Justice of the New York Supreme Court, and remained on the bench until September 1790 when he reached the constitutional age limit. In 1788, he was a delegate to the New York Convention to Ratify the U.S. Constitution. On October 19, 1789, he administered the oaths of office to Chief Justice of the U.S. Supreme Court John Jay.

In December 1794, he ran on the Federalist ticket for Congress in the Westchester–Richmond district, but was defeated by Democratic-Republican Philip Van Cortlandt.

== Personal life ==
On June 13, 1759, he married Sarah Ludlow (1730–1791), the daughter of Henry Ludlow (1701–1784) and Mary Corbett and the sister of William Henry Ludlow. Together, they had five children:

- Lewis Richard Morris (1760–1825), who married Theodosia Olcott (d. 1800), who died soon after. He later married Ellen Hunt (1781–1865), daughter of Jonathan Hunt.
- Robert Morris (1762–1851), who married Frances Ludlum (1766–1852).
- Mary Morris (1763–1836), who married William Popham.
- Catherine Morris (1765–1765), who died in infancy.
- Catherine Morris (1766–1767), who also died in infancy.

He owned estates in Westchester county at Mount Fordham and in Scarsdale. Mount Fordham was burned by the British during the American Revolution.

He died on April 11, 1810, in Scarsdale, New York; and was buried at the Trinity Churchyard in New York City.

=== Descendants ===
His granddaughter, Mary Morris (1790–1869), married James Alexander Hamilton (1788–1878), son of Founding Father Alexander Hamilton. His grandson, Lewis Gouverneur Morris (1808–1900), was married to Emily Lorillard (1819–1850), of the Lorillard Tobacco family.

== Sources ==
Legal offices
Preceded by John Jay	Chief Justice of the New York Supreme Court; 1779–1790	Succeeded by Robert Yates
