= James Boggs (surgeon) =

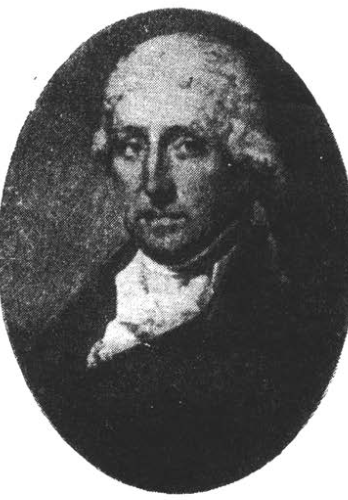
James Boggs (1740-1830)

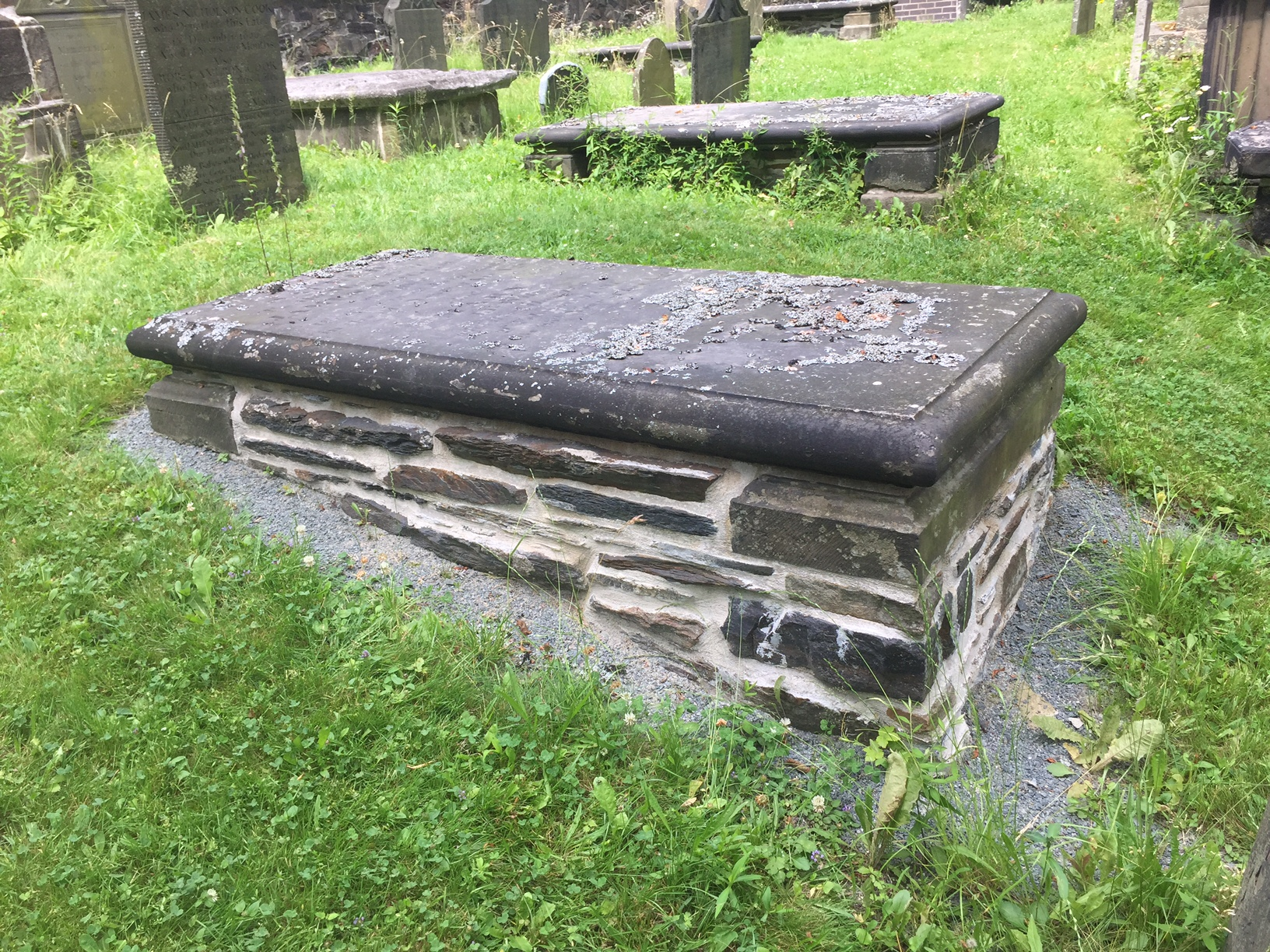
James Boggs, Old Burying Ground, Halifax, Nova Scotia

Dr. James Boggs (22 January 1740, New Castle, Delaware County, Pennsylvania – 8 July 1830, Halifax, Nova Scotia) was surgeon who migrated from New York to Nova Scotia during the American Revolution.

Boggs married Mary Morris in New York (1765) and they had eight children. (Mary's father was the former Governor of Pennsylvania and the Chief Justice of New Jersey, Robert Hunter Morris.) He practiced medicine in Shrewsbury Township, New Jersey until the start of the American Revolution (1764-1777). He was the president of the New Jersey Medical Society. He left his family to escape being captured by Patriot forces in 1776 and went to New York. In New York he worked as the assistant surgeon at the General Hospital (1777-1783). He served as the surgeon for the 2nd Battalion of Brigadier General Cortlandt Skinner.

Throughout the war, Boggs would secretly visit his family. On one occasion, the Patriot forces searched the home, did not find him and ransacked it, carrying off most of the silver.

In 1783, Boggs evacuated New York with his family and settled in Halifax, Nova Scotia. The British government awarded him 630 pounds for his losses. On 3 March, he was located at Port Matoon, where he was surgeon a detachment of troops. He then was posted to Halifax. He worked as a surgeon to the garrison until 1810. In 1802, he served the 29th Regiment. During that time he also served as surgeon to Prince Edward, residing at the Prince's Lodge. In 1824, James Boggs purchased the Lawrence Hartshorne small house lot in Halifax on the north east corner of Granville and Sackville Streets. His son Thomas would later purchase the Hartshoren home in Dartmouth.

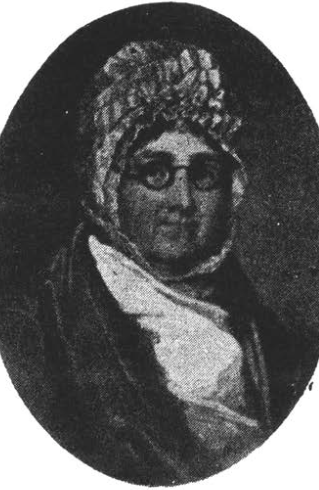
Mary Morris Boggs by Robert Field (painter)

Boggs died in Halifax in 1830 and as interred in the Old Burying Ground (Halifax, Nova Scotia).

== See also ==
- Nova Scotia in the American Revolution
