= John Watson (American painter) =

American painter

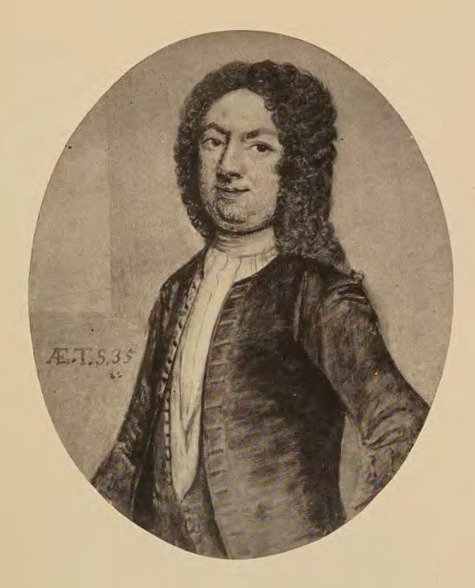
- self-portrait, 1720
- Born: July 28, 1685; Dumfries and Galloway
- Died: August 22, 1768; Perth Amboy
- Occupation: Painter

John Watson (1685 – August 22, 1768) was an early American painter, born in Scotland.

== Early life ==
Watson was born in Scotland in 1685, probably near Dumfries. He worked initially painting house interiors, before turning to portraiture.

== Work in America ==
In 1715 he emigrated to Perth Amboy, New Jersey. Watson bought property in the city east of Rector Street and south of St. Peter's Episcopal Church on the Perth Amboy bluffs and built himself a house in which to reside and one to keep his paintings. Early historian William Dunlap believed this to be the first collection of art in America. In 1776, his nephew, Alexander Watson, who was heir to his estate, withdrew from Perth Amboy, which was under pressure from colonial forces under General Hugh Mercer. Soldiers raided Watson's collection and, according to Dunlap, probably distributed and destroyed many of the portraits of English heroes and kings. Contrary to Dunlap's knowledge, however, numerous portraits by Watson still exist today. The Historical Society of Pennsylvania has a portrait of Governor William Keith (shown on the left) and his wife, Lady Ann Keith née Newberry or Newbury, and the Brooklyn Museum has his portrait of Governor Lewis Morris. The New Jersey Historical Society has two portraits: one of William Eier, the first mayor of Perth Amboy, and one of Governor William Burnet. Watson died in 1768 and is buried in St. Peter's Episcopal Cemetery in Perth Amboy.

== Gallery ==
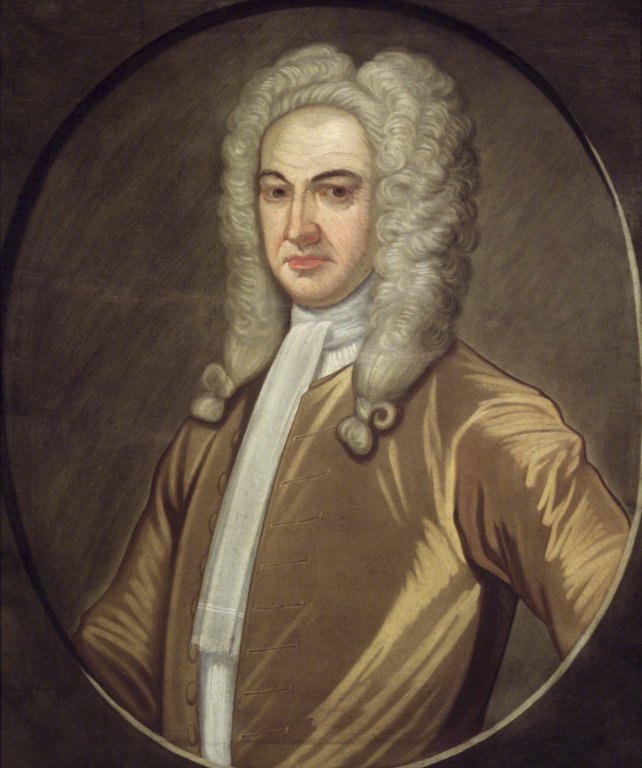
New Jersey Governor Lewis Morris

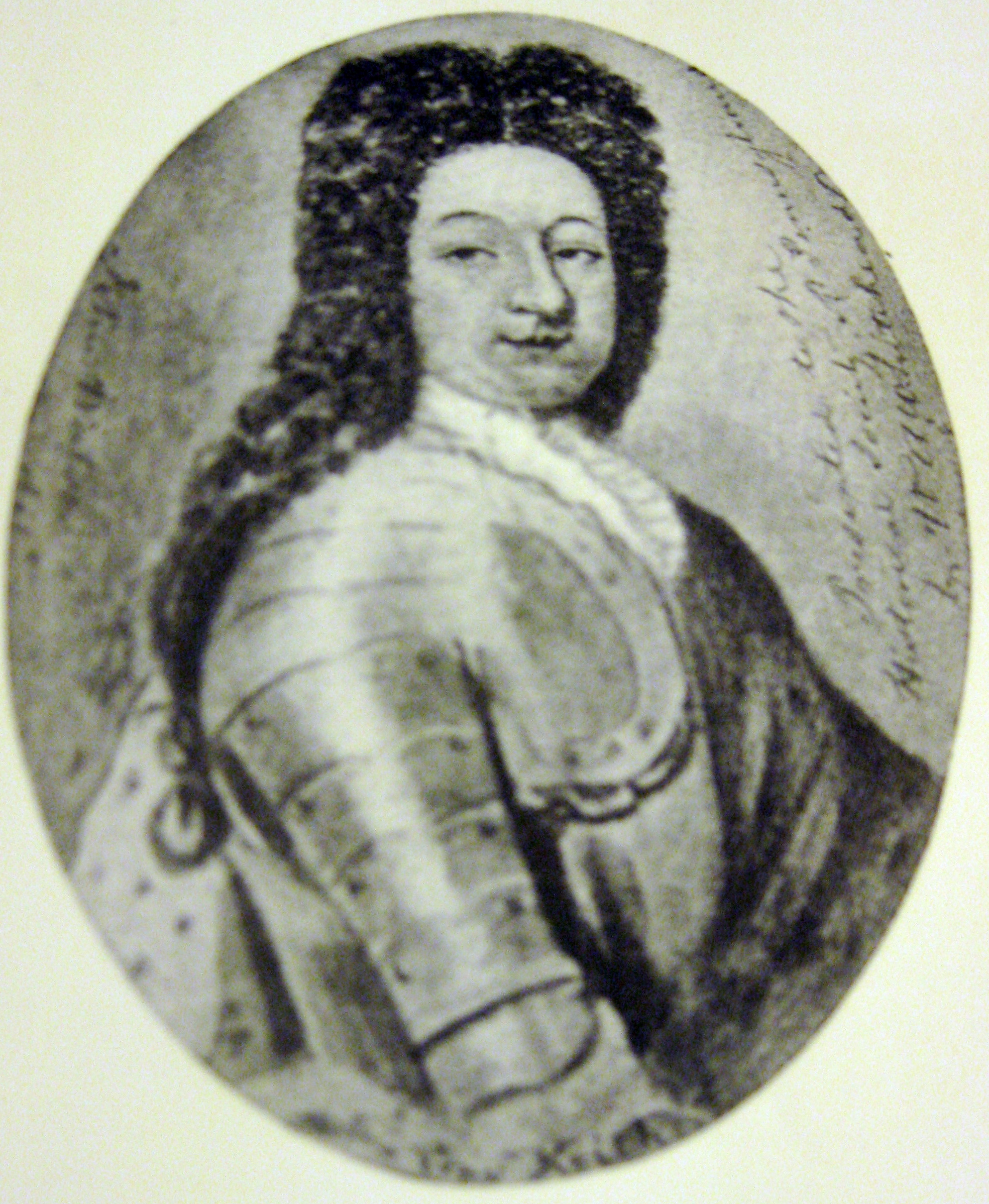
Pennsylvania Governor William Keith

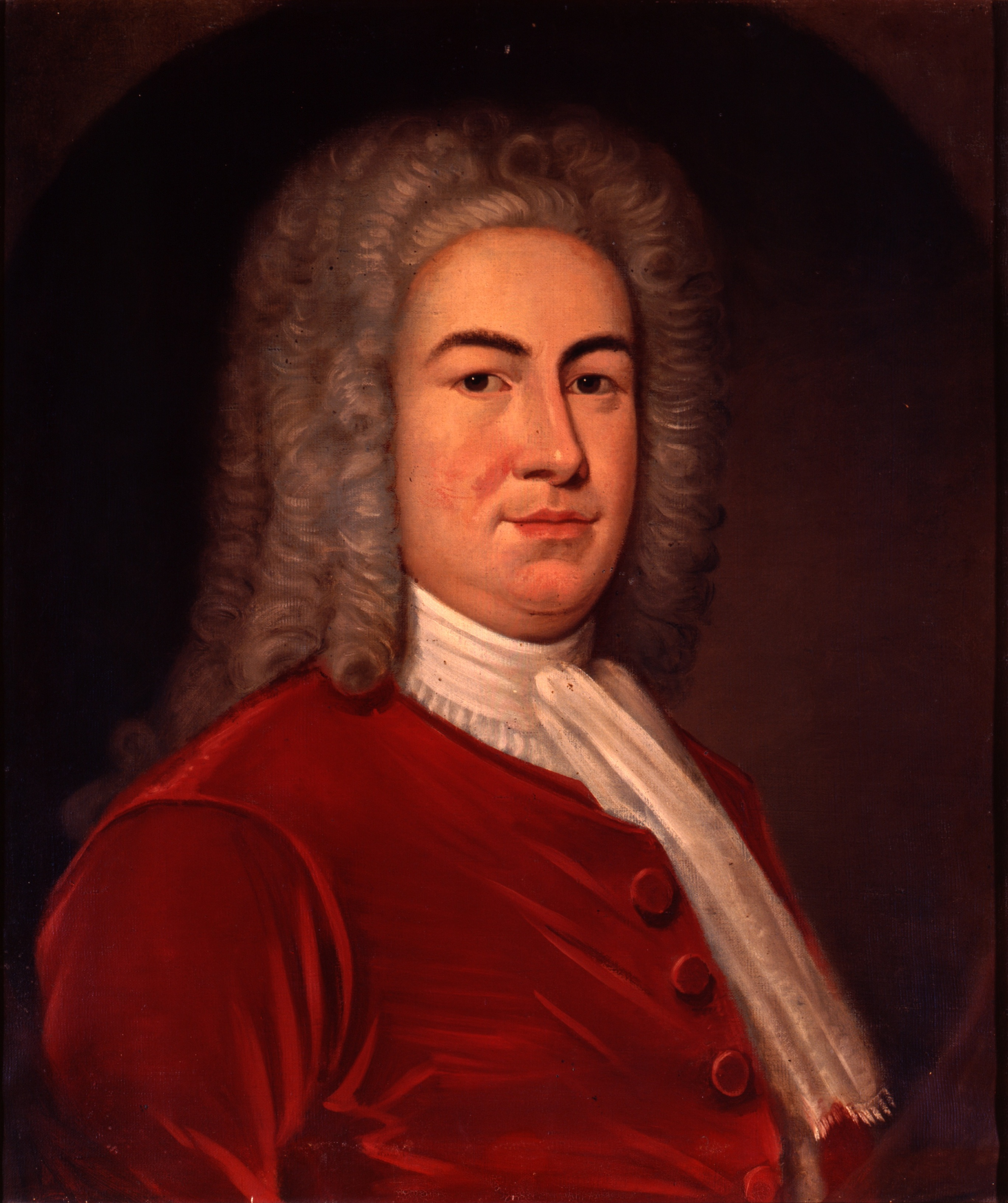
New Jersey and New York Governor William Burnet

== Artworks ==
Year	Title	Image	Collection	Comments
1718	Portrait of Hermanus Wendell, oil			IAP 60940560
1726	Portrait of Governor Lewis Morris (c. 1726), oil on linen		Brooklyn Museum, Brooklyn, New York	Subject: Lewis Morris (1671-1746); chief justice of Province of New York; Royal Provincial Governor of Province of New Jersey. IAP 35680394
1726	Portrait of Governor William Burnet (c. 1726), oil on canvas		Massachusetts State House, Boston, Massachusetts	Subject: William Burnet (1688-1729); Royal Provincial Governor of Province of New York (1720-1728); Royal Provincial Governor of Province of Massachusetts Bay (1728-1729). IAP 82110142, IAP 81980002, IAP 33220002 and IAP 18830380
	Self-portrait, painting			IAP 24050046
	Portrait of David Lyell (c. 1715-1725), miniature painting, graphite pencil and watercolor on vellum			Subject: lived 1670-1725. IAP 07262091
	Vase of Flowers with Grapes and Cherries, oil			IAP 70080681
	Venus and Cupid, ink on vellum			Exhibited: Chronological Exhibition of American Art, Brooklyn, New York, 1872.

=== Attributed artworks ===
Year	Title	Image	Collection	Comments
1735	Portrait of Jan Baptist Van Rensselaer (c. 1735), oil on canvas	view	Albany Institute of History & Art, Albany, New York	Subject: lived 1717-1763.

== Sources ==
- Inventories of American Painting (IAP), Smithsonian Institution Research Information System(SIRIS): http://sirismm.si.edu/siris/aboutari.htm
