= New Jersey Provincial Council =

1700s colonial state house in New Jersey

Type
- Type: Upper house of the New Jersey Legislature

Leadership
- President of Council: Various

Structure
- Seats: 12
- Political groups: Local factions
- Length of term: Indefinite
- Authority: The Crown

Meeting place
- Alternately Burlington and Perth Amboy

His Majesty's Council for the Province of New Jersey was the upper house of the New Jersey Legislature under colonial rule until it was replaced by the New Jersey Legislative Council under the New Jersey Constitution of 1776.

== History ==
The Provincial Council was established in 1702 upon the surrender by the Proprietors of East Jersey and those of West Jersey of the right of government to Queen Anne. Anne's government united the two colonies as the Province of New Jersey, a royal colony, establishing a new system of government.

The instructions from Queen Anne to Viscount Cornbury, the first royal governor of New Jersey, outlined a fusion of powers system, which allowed for an overlap of executive, legislative and judicial authority. It provided for a bicameral legislature consisting of a Council and General Assembly.

On December 6, 1775, Governor William Franklin prorogued the New Jersey Legislature until January 3, 1776, but it never met again. On May 30, 1776, Franklin attempted to convene the legislature, but was met instead with an order by the New Jersey Provincial Congress for his arrest. On July 2, 1776, the Provincial Congress approved a new constitution, and on August 13 a new legislature was elected, with the appointed Provincial Council being succeeded by the elected New Jersey Legislative Council.

== Composition ==
The Provincial Council consisted of twelve members, appointed by and serving at the pleasure of the British crown. With the exception of resignations and those being removed for cause, councillors often served for life. The former provinces of East and West Jersey were reorganized as the Eastern Division and the Western Division, respectively, of the Province of New Jersey. Councillors were apportioned that six would come from each of the two divisions. In practice, however, this was not always followed.

Three or more councillors were to be considered a quorum. The governor was to notify the Crown of any vacancies, whereupon they would be filled by appointment. If the membership dropped below seven however, the governor was empowered to appoint as many councillors as would bring membership to seven. These members would then serve until either confirmed or replaced by the Crown.

The senior councillor actually residing in New Jersey would, by virtue of his seniority, be President of Council. If there was no lieutenant governor, it was he who would succeed if a vacancy occurred in the Governor's office due to death or absence from New Jersey.

In 1733 the Crown decreed that the Surveyor General of His Majesty's Customs would be seated as Councillor Extraordinary, but would be excluded from succession to the Presidency.

== Powers ==
The Provincial Council was the upper house of the colonial legislature, and as such was a predecessor to the modern New Jersey Senate. Laws enacted were to be styled as by the governor, council and assembly. Once approved by both houses and signed by the governor, laws were to be transmitted to London, to be signed or disallowed by the Crown.

Gubernatorial appointments, including judges, justices of the peace and sheriffs, were to be made with the advice and consent of the council. Salaries and fees were to be set by the governor with the advice and consent of the council.

The Governor and Council comprised the Court of Appeals in civil cases exceeding the value of £100, although any councillor who also sat as a judge of the court from whence the appeal was made was not permitted to vote on that appeal. Cases exceeding £200 could be further appealed to the Crown.

== List of presidents ==
The following is a list of presidents of the New Jersey Provincial Council from the 1702 surrender of government to the Crown to the adoption of the 1776 State Constitution.

- 1703-04: Lewis Morris, Eastern Division
- 1705-08: Andrew Bowne, Eastern Division
- 1708-09: Lewis Morris, Eastern Division
- 1709: William Pinhorne, Eastern Division
- 1709-34: Lewis Morris, Eastern Division
- 1735-36: John Anderson, Eastern Division
- 1736-47: John Hamilton, Western Division
- 1747-58: John Reading, Western Division
- 1758-64: Robert Hunter Morris, Eastern Division
- 1764-75: Peter Kemble, Eastern Division
