= John Anderson (New Jersey politician) =

President of the New Jersey Provincial Council
- In office 1735 – March 28, 1736
- Preceded by: Lewis Morris
- Succeeded by: John Hamilton

Member of the New Jersey Provincial Council for the Eastern Division
- In office June 15, 1713 – March 28, 1736

Personal details
- Born: c1665 Fortrose, Scotland
- Died: March 28, 1736 Monmouth County, New Jersey
- Resting place: Topanemus Cemetery, Marlboro Township
- Spouse: Anna Reid
- Children: 8

John Anderson (1665 – March 28, 1736) was a Scottish colonel who served as acting governor of New Jersey in 1736.

== Biography ==
John Anderson was born in Fortrose, Scotland, in 1665. He was the son of James Anderson, who was born in the same town. James Anderson served for many years as alderman-magistrate. In 1675, he moved with his family to Edinburgh and finally settled in Glasgow.

After the capture of Captain Robert Pinkerton by the Spanish, John Anderson became captain of the Unicorn, which rescued the survivors of the Darien scheme, a Scottish attempt to colonize Central America in 1698. On the return voyage the ship stopped at the island of Jamaica with the goal of being repaired and to get supplies. However, after leaving the island, the ship encountered a storm, and limped its way to the port of Perth Amboy, New Jersey. After Unicorn landed and the survivors were put ashore, she was stripped down and eventually sank in the Arthur Kill, at the foot of Fayette Street.

"The Unicorn reached New York, August 14th, 1699, after a tempestuous voyage; Captain John Anderson saving the ship by his skillful seamanship."

Colonel Anderson was based in the Matawan, New Jersey area. From 1713 through 1736 he was of the New Jersey Provincial Council. Later, Anderson was acting governor of New Jersey for 18 days. In 1713, when he was first placed on the council, an effort was made to discredit him in order to block his appointment, accusing him of being a Presbyterian, which would have invalidated his appointment. He is also accused of looting the Unicorn while she was incapacitated. Both accusations were proven false. In reality, he was a member of the Church of England.

The senior councillor actually residing in New Jersey would, by virtue of his seniority, be President of Council. Anderson became president in 1735, succeeding Lewis Morris. Upon the March 10, 1736 death of Gov. Sir William Cosby; John Anderson became acting governor, and served for eighteen days; Anderson himself died on March 28. John Hamilton then became President of Council as well as acting governor, and served as the latter until Gov. Lewis Morris took office.

== Personal life ==
Anderson married Anna, daughter of John Reid on December 7, 1701 in Tintern Manor, in Shrewsbury Township. The day after his wedding John Reid granted Col. Anderson, his son-in-law, land in Manalapan. The Reids were also of Scottish origin. The children of John and Anna Reid Anderson were: John (b. c. 1704), James (b. July 7, 1708), Helena, Johnathan, Margaret, Anna, Elizabeth and Isabella Anderson.
