= List of speakers of the New York General Assembly =

Speaker of the New York General Assembly
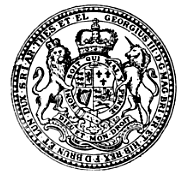
- Seal of the Province of New York, 1767

- Formation: October 14, 1683
- First holder: James Graham
- Final holder: John Cruger
- Abolished: May 1775
- Succession: Speaker of the New York State Assembly

The Speaker of the New York General Assembly was the highest official in the New York General Assembly, the first representative governing body in New York from 1683 to 1775 when the assembly disbanded after the outbreak of the American Revolutionary War.

As in most countries with a British heritage, the Speaker presides over the lower house of the legislature and was elected from within the ranks of the General Assembly.

== New York General Assembly ==
The New York General Assembly was first convened on October 14, 1683, during the governorship of Thomas Dongan, 2nd Earl of Limerick, which passed an act entitled "A Charter of Liberties" that decreed that the supreme legislative power under the Duke of York shall reside in a governor, council, and the people convened in general assembly; conferred upon the members of the assembly rights and privileges making them a body coequal to and independent of the British Parliament; established town, county, and general courts of justice; solemnly proclaimed the right of religious liberty; and passed acts enunciating certain constitutional liberties, e.g. taxes could be levied only by the people met in general assembly; right of suffrage; and no martial law or quartering of the soldiers without the consent of the inhabitants.

The General Assembly elected a Speaker from their own ranks, chose their own clerk, and published their own journal.

=== List of Speakers ===
The following were elected from the General Assembly to serve as Speaker of the Assembly. (Note: No journals or records of names of members of general assembly, between 1683 and 1691, are preserved.)

| Speaker | District | Took office | Left office | Notes |
|---|---|---|---|---|
| James Graham | New York County (Note: The current New York County; Manhattan.) | April 9, 1691; October 26, 1692; September 3, 1693 | September 13, 1692; July 27, 1693; November 16, 1693 | Three terms |
| Henry Pierson | Suffolk County | March 2, 1694 | April 20, 1695 | |
| James Graham | New York County | June 20, 1695 | April 2, 1698 | |
| Philip French | New York County | May 19, 1698 | June 14, 1698 | |
| James Graham | New York County | March 2, 1699 | May 15, 1699 (Note: Graham was replaced by Abraham Gouverneur during the 7th Assembly.) | |
| Abraham Gouverneur | New York County | May 15, 1699; August 19, 1701 | June 1, 1701; May 3, 1702 | |
| William Nicoll | Suffolk County | October 20, 1702; June 7, 1705; August 18, 1708; April 5, 1709; September 1, 1710; July 2, 1711; May 27, 1713; May 3, 1715; June 5, 1716 | November 6, 1704; May 5, 1707; January 5, 1709; November 12, 1709; April 20, 1711; March 3, 1713; September 9, 1714 (Note: The 15th Assembly was dissolved upon the death of Queen Anne which occurred on August 1, 1714.); August 11, 1715; May 27, 1718 (Note: Nicoll resigned May 27, 1718 due to ill health.) | A son of 6th New York City mayor Matthias Nicoll, and the father of the man who served as Speaker between 1759 and 1768. |
| Robert Livingston Jr. | Livingston Manor (Note: Livingston Manor was a 160,000 acre (650 square kilometres (250 sq mi)) tract of land granted to Robert Livingston the Elder and confirmed by royal charter of George I of Great Britain in 1715, creating the manor and lordship of Livingston. The original patent was obtained in July 1686.) | May 27, 1718 | July 24, 1724 | An uncle of the below-named Philip Livingston |
| Adolph Philipse | New York County | August 6, 1725 (Note: Elected in place of Livingston, who was absent on August 1, 1725.); September 27, 1726; September 30, 1727; July 28, 1728 | August 10, 1726; August 21, 1727 (Note: The 18th Assembly was dissolved upon the death of George I which occurred on June 11, 1727.); November 25, 1727; May 30, 1737 | |
| Lewis Morris Jr. | Westchester County (Note: Now, Westchester and Bronx counties.) | June 15, 1737 | October 20, 1738 | Father of Lewis Morris |
| Adolph Philipse | New York County | March 27, 1739; November 8, 1743 | December 27, 1743; May 14, 1745 | |
| David Jones | Queens County (Note: Now, Queens and Nassau counties.) | June 25, 1745; February 12, 1747; September 4, 1750; October 24, 1752 | November 25, 1747; July 20, 1750; November 25, 1751; December 17, 1758 | |
| William Nicoll | Suffolk County | January 31, 1759; March 10, 1761 | March 2, 1761 (Note: The 18th Assembly was dissolved upon the death of George II which occurred on October 25, 1760.); February 6, 1768 | A son of the man who served as Speaker between 1702 and 1718 |
| Philip Livingston | New York County | October 27, 1768 | January 2, 1769 | A nephew of the above-named Robert Livingston |
| John Cruger | New York County | April 4, 1769 | April 8, 1775 | |

== See also ==
- List of colonial governors of New York
- New York General Assembly
- List of Speakers of the New York State Assembly
