= John Jones (doctor) =

American politician

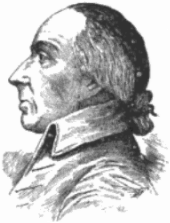

Member of the New York State Senate
- In office 1777 – February 1778

Personal details
- Born: 1729 Jamaica, New York
- Died: June 23, 1791 (aged 61–62) Philadelphia, Pennsylvania
- Citizenship: United States
- Education: Reims University
- Occupation: Physician, politician

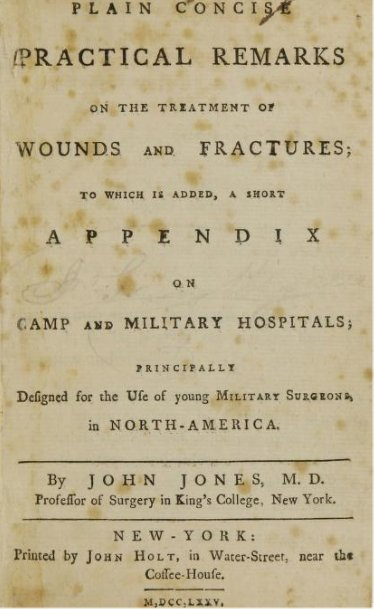
Copy of Plain Concise Practical Remarks, on the Treatment of Wounds and Fractures, authored by John Jones

John Jones (1729 – June 23, 1791) was an American physician who wrote the book Plain, Concise, Practical Remarks on the Treatment of Wounds and Fractures.

== Biography ==
Jones was born in Jamaica, Queens County, New York. He graduated from Reims University in 1751 with a degree in medicine. Among others Jones studied medicine under Percival Pott. Jones served as a surgeon in the French and Indian War. After the war, he wrote his guide on wound treatment and served as a professor of medicine at King's College, which is today Columbia University.

In 1769 he was recognized by the American Society and elected to membership.

In his book, first published in 1775, Jones recommended such actions as removing bullets as soon as possible and cleaning wounds.

In 1777, Jones was appointed to the New York State Senate but resigned in February 1778, due to ill health. In 1780, he removed to Philadelphia and became the physician of Benjamin Franklin and George Washington.

Doctor Jones was good friends with Gouverneur Morris, the "penman of the Constitution." James J. Kirschke, Gouverneur Morris: Author, Statesman, and Man of the World (St. Martin's Press, 2005) at 116.

Jones and Gouverneur Morris boarded at Miss Dally's boarding house on Market between Second and Third Streets in Philadelphia.

Benjamin Rush noted in his diary: "This day died Dr. John Jones…aged 57…He was much lamented by his friends and patients, as well as by his brother physicians. His manners were gentle and amiable, and his conduct truly liberal in his profession. He was without a rival in surgery in the United States. His education was extensive, and he spoke agreeably upon all subjects. He lived and died a batchelor."

He died at his home in Philadelphia on June 23, 1791.

== Sources ==
- Middlekauff, Robert. The Glorious Cause: The American Revolution, 1763-1789. (New York: Oxford University Press, 1982) p. 525
- Joyner Library catalogue mention of Jones book
- Peltier, Leonard F. Fractures: A History and Iconography of Their Treatment. 1990. p. 35
- The American biographical dictionary by William Allen (John P. Jewett & Co., Boston; and Henry P. B. Jewett, Cleveland, Ohio; 1857; page 483)
