= Robert Hunter Morris =

American judge (1700–1764)

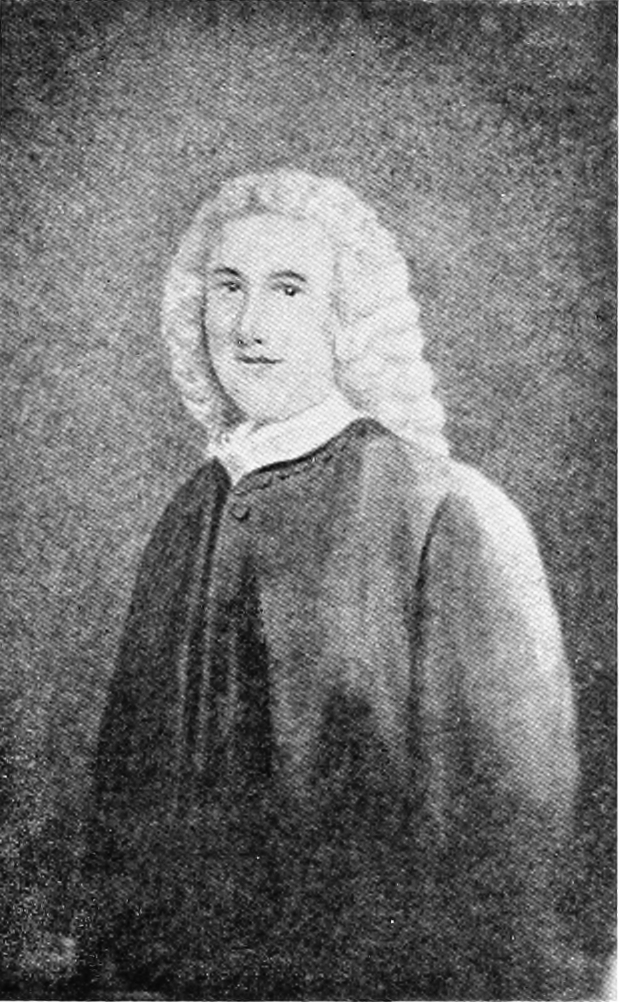
- Robert Hunter Morris, 1754

Deputy Governor of Pennsylvania
- In office 1754–1756
- Preceded by: James Hamilton
- Succeeded by: William Denny

Member of the New Jersey Provincial Council for the Eastern Division
- In office April 1738 – 27 January 1764 His death.
- Succeeded by: James Parker

Chief Justice of the New Jersey Supreme Court
- In office 17 March 1739 – 27 January 1764 His death.
- Preceded by: Robert Lettis Hooper
- Succeeded by: Charles Reade

Personal details
- Born: c. 1700 Trenton, New Jersey
- Died: 27 January 1764 Shrewsbury, New Jersey
- Spouse: Elizabeth Stogdell (died 1752)
- Relations: Lewis Morris (brother)
- Children: Mary Morris; Robert Morris

Robert Hunter Morris (c. 1700 – 27 January 1764) was a prominent governmental figure in Colonial Pennsylvania, serving as governor of Pennsylvania and Chief Justice of the New Jersey Supreme Court.

== Early life and education ==
Morris was born in 1700 in Trenton, New Jersey. He was the second son of Lewis Morris and Isabella (née Graham) Morris and named after his father's friend the future colonial governor Robert Hunter. His older brother was Lewis Morris Jr. who served as a member and speaker of the New York General Assembly. His father was very prominent in public life and variously served as chief justice of New York and as the 8th Colonial Governor of New Jersey.

His paternal grandparents were Sarah (née Pole) Morris and Richard Morris, who was originally from Monmouthshire, Wales. His grandparents bought Morrisania from Samuel Edsall in 1670 and moved there from Barbados. His mother was the eldest daughter of James Graham, who served as the first Speaker of the New York General Assembly and the first Recorder of New York City. Graham, who was born in Midlothian, Scotland, was a grandson of James Graham, 1st Marquess of Montrose.

He received what was described at the time as a "liberal education", and received additional training from his father in politics.

== Political career ==
When his father was named Governor of New Jersey in 1738, his son's name appeared on his list of councilors. Less than a year later, Governor Morris named Robert the chief justice of the provincial Supreme Court. His commission was set to run "during good behavior of same", which differed from that of his predecessor, Robert Lettis Hooper, whose term was determined to run "through the royal pleasure". His term was marked by increased punctuality and efficiency. During his term in 1744 he was elected a member of The American Philosophical Society. Following a long trip to England in 1749, he was made Deputy Governor of Pennsylvania in 1754 and elected a Fellow of the Royal Society in 1755 after his return.

He served as Deputy Governor from 1754 to 1756, during the French and Indian War. (Early governors of Pennsylvania were referred to as "deputy governors" because Thomas Penn, who resided in England, was the official "Governor", as well as one of the proprietors of the province along with his brother, Richard Penn. He often clashed with the Assembly over proposals to emit paper money to fund the war. In the spring of 1756, Morris announced volunteer scalping parties. These scalping parties were "the only way to clear our Frontier of Savages", according to Morris's councilor, James Hamilton. He was the uncle of Congressman Lewis Morris of New York.

During the second half of 1755, the contest between the proprietors of the Colony of Pennsylvania (the Penn family) and the Pennsylvania Assembly became a duel between Morris and Benjamin Franklin. The main point of contention was the adamant refusal of the Penns to countenance any tax upon their lands in Pennsylvania, even for provincial defense. During the summer and autumn of 1755, while the frontier burned and the settlers fled for their lives from attacks by French-friendly Indians, the proprietors and the Assembly locked in legislative stalemate. Morris defended the proprietors and Franklin spoke for the people of Pennsylvania.

In late July 1755, the Assembly authorized the expenditure of 50,000 pounds for provincial defense following the defeat of Major General Edward Braddock by the French and Indian soldiers near Fort Duquesne in western Pennsylvania. To raise the money, the Assembly approved a property tax, applicable to all real and personal property within the province. Morris vetoed the tax bill with suggestions for amendment that would exempt the proprietary estates.

Franklin drafted the Assembly's response, the gist of which was that taxing the proprietary estates, along with all the other estates in the province, was "perfectly equitable and just." Eventually, Morris admitted that the terms of his commission prohibited his accepting any measure that taxed the proprietary estates. This prompted Franklin to bypass Morris and take on the proprietors themselves, which led to Franklin's removal to London in 1757 to argue the Assembly's side in the dispute with the proprietors.

In 1756, Morris resigned his commission as Chief Justice (which was not accepted) and made another long trip to England. Wiliam Aynsley was made Chief Justice in his absence. When Morris returned in 1760, he claimed he was still Chief Justice on the grounds that his resignation had never been formally accepted. As Aynsley had died and Morris was the best person available to fill the post, he was reinstated and served in that capacity until his own death in 1764.

== Personal life ==
Morris was married to Elizabeth Stogdell (1673–1752). Together, they were the parents of:

- Robert Morris (1745–1815), a prominent judge who corresponded with Thomas Jefferson.
- Mary Morris (1746–1831), who in 1765 married James Boggs, a surgeon who left New York for Nova Scotia during the Revolution.

Morris died on 27 January 1764 in Shrewsbury, New Jersey.

== See also ==
- List of lieutenant governors of Colonial Pennsylvania
