= Abraham Gouverneur =

American merchant and politician

Recorder of New York City
- In office 1701–1703
- Preceded by: James Graham
- Succeeded by: Sampson Shelton Broughton

Speaker of the New York General Assembly
- In office May 15, 1699 – May 3, 1702
- Preceded by: James Graham
- Succeeded by: William Nicoll

Personal details
- Born: 1671 Amsterdam, Netherlands
- Died: June 16, 1740 (aged 68–69) New York City, Province of New York, British America
- Spouse: Mary Leisler
- Parent(s): Nicolas Gouverneur; Maghteld de Riemer

Abraham Gouverneur (1671 – June 16, 1740) was a Dutch born colonial American merchant and Leislerian politician who served as the Speaker of the New York General Assembly.

== Early life ==
Gouverneur was born in 1671 "upon the Single, near the Konings Pleyn" in Amsterdam, the Netherlands. He later moved to New York City in what was then the Province of New York, a part of British America. He was the son of Nicolas Gouverneur (d. 1682) and Maghteld (née de Riemer) Gouverneur (1644–1721). He was the brother of Elisabeth Gouverneur, Isaac Gouverneur, and Elisabeth Gouverneur. After the death of his father in 1682, his mother remarried to Jasper Nissepadt (Nesbitt), and had another child, Jannetje Nissepadt.

== Career ==
Gouverneur, a successful merchant, was involved in the organization of Harlem in upper Manhattan, and received land known as the Abraham Gouverneur Patent that he purchased in February 1713. Along with fellow merchant Nicholas Stuyvesant (son of Peter Stuyvesant, the last Dutch Director-General of New Amsterdam), he was an associate of German-born businessman Jacob Leisler, the 8th Colonial Governor of New York known for his rabid anti-Catholic Calvinist views and the leader of a populist political faction known as "Leislerians". Reportedly, four days before Gov. Henry Sloughter arrived in New York, Gouverneur shot the parish clerk and was charged with his murder. After Sloughter arrived, he put down Leisler's Rebellion and Leisler was hanged in May 1691. A year after Leisler's execution, Gourverneur and Jacob Leisler Jr. traveled to London and lobbied government officials, members of Parliament, and cabinet officers to clear Leisler's name, and were eventually helped by the powerful Whigs.

He was a member of the New York General Assembly, representing Orange County (which is now Orange and Rockland counties), from 1699 to 1702, and later representing New York County (the current New York County, Manhattan), from 1701 to 1702. From May 15, 1699, to May 3, 1702, he was also the Speaker of the Assembly. Later, he served as Recorder of New York City, essentially the deputy mayor of New York City, from 1701 to 1703 under mayors Isaac De Riemer, Thomas Noell, and Phillip French.

== Personal life ==
Gouverneur was married to Mary Leisler (1669–1747), the daughter of his associate Jacob Leisler. Mary was the widow of Jacob Milborne, the English born clerk who was an ally and secretary of Mary's father, both of whom were executed for their part in Leisler's Rebellion. Together, they were the parents of four children who reached maturity, including:

- Nicholas Gouverneur (1700–1739), who was the father of Abraham, Esther, Barent and Nicholas Gouverneur.
- Jacoba Gouverneur (b. 1701)
- Elizabeth Gouverneur (1704–1751)
- Jacob Gouverneur (b. 1710), who died young.
- Maria Gouverneur (b. 1712), who married Henry Myer Jr. and Captain Jasper Farmer.

Gouverneur died in New York City on June 16, 1740.

=== Legacy and honors ===
Gouverneur Street, Gouverneur Lane, and Gouverneur Slip were all named after Abraham.
