= Lewis Morris =

American Founding Father and developer

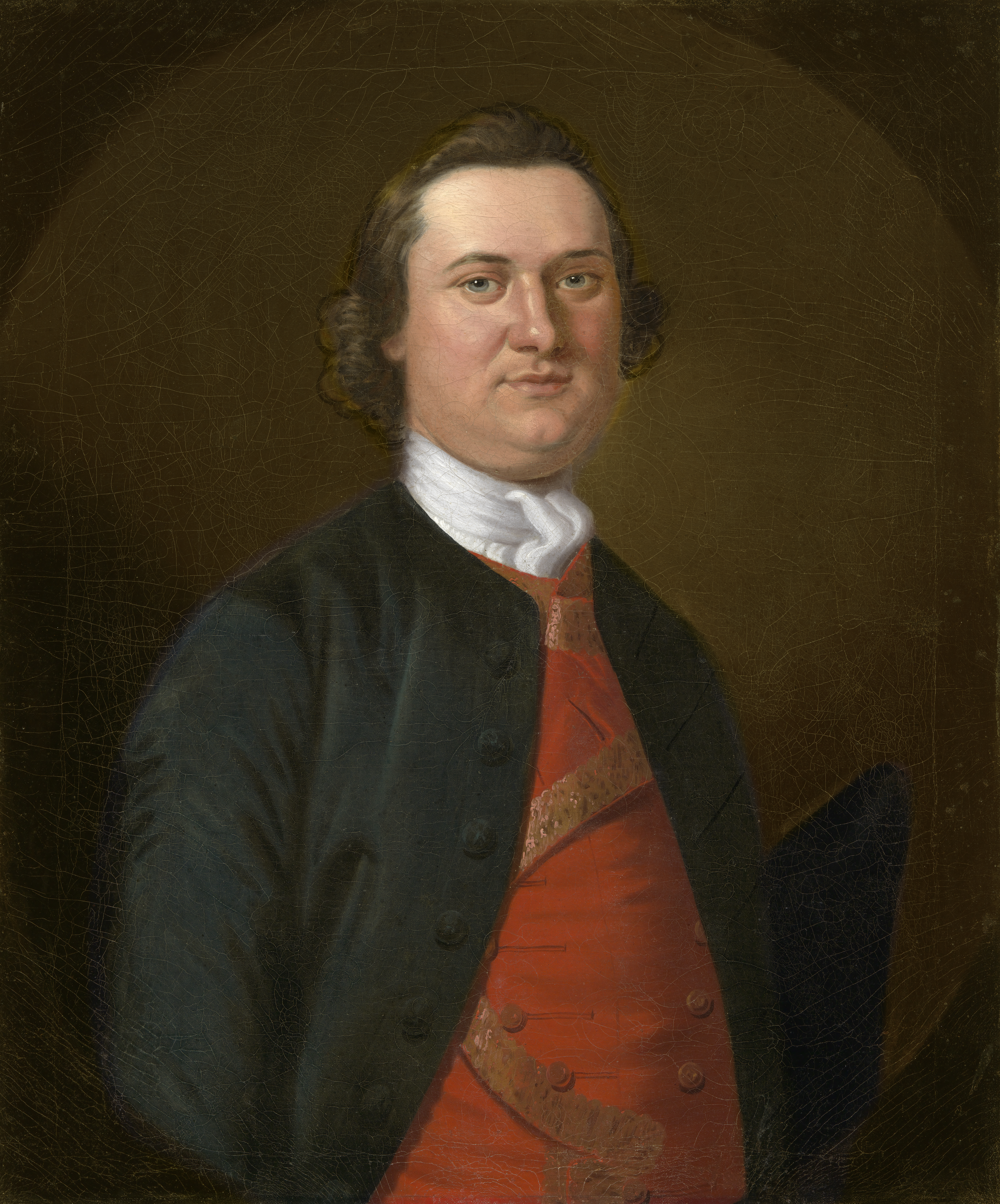
- Portrait by John Wollaston, c. 1750

New York State Senator from the Southern District
- In office July 1, 1783 – June 30, 1790
- In office September 9, 1777 – July 1, 1781

Member of the Continental Congress from New York
- In office 1775-1777

Member of the New York Provincial Congress
- In office 1775-1777

Personal details
- Born: April 8, 1726 Morrisania, New York, British America
- Died: January 22, 1798 (aged 71) Morrisania, New York, U.S.
- Party: Federalist
- Spouse: Mary Walton (m. 1749)
- Children: 10, including Richard
- Parent(s): Lewis Morris; Katrintje Staats
- Relatives: Staats Long Morris (brother); Richard Morris (brother); Gouverneur Morris (half-brother); Robert Hunter Morris (uncle); Lewis Morris (grandfather); John Rutherfurd (son-in-law)
- Education: Yale College
- Known for: Signer of the Declaration of Independence

Lewis Morris (April 8, 1726 – January 22, 1798) was an American Founding Father, landowner, and developer from Morrisania, New York, presently part of Bronx County. He signed the U.S. Declaration of Independence as a delegate to the Continental Congress from New York.

== Early life and family ==
Morris was born on April 8, 1726, at his family's estate, Morrisania, presently part of Bronx County, in what was then the Province of New York. He was the third Lewis Morris in the Morris family. He was the son of Lewis Morris (1698–1762) and Katrintje "Catherine" Staats (1697–1731). After his mother died, his father married Sarah Gouverneur (1714–1786). He graduated from Yale College in 1746, and upon his father's death in 1762, he inherited the bulk of the estate.

Morris' father had seven children, including his siblings, Staats Long Morris (1728–1800) and Richard Morris (1730–1810), and his half-siblings, Mary Lawrence, Gouverneur Morris (1752–1816), Isabella, and Catherine. His uncle was Robert Hunter Morris (1700–1764), the governor of Pennsylvania. His cousin by marriage was William Paterson (1745–1806), the governor of New Jersey and father-in-law of Stephen Van Rensselaer, the lieutenant governor of New York, who was the brother of Philip Schuyler Van Rensselaer, mayor of Albany, New York. Anthony Walton White (1750–1803), a Continental Army general, was his cousin through Morris' aunt, Elizabeth Morris (1712–c. 1784).

=== Family history ===
His great-grandfather, Richard Morris (died 1672), immigrated to New York through Barbados after being part of Oliver Cromwell's army in the English Civil War of 1648. He purchased the first tract of land in the Bronx that became the basis for the Morrisania manor. Richard and his young wife died, leaving behind an infant son, Lewis Morris (1671–1746). Richard's brother, Colonel Lewis Morris, also of Barbados, came to Morrisania to help manage the estate owned by his infant nephew. Col. Morris and his wife were childless.

When he came of age, Lewis Morris expanded and patented the estate. He married Isabella and went on to serve as the 8th colonial governor of New Jersey. Morris was a popular governor who championed land owning rights for the colonists. Morristown, New Jersey, was named for him.

== Career ==
In 1769, he was elected to the New York General Assembly. In 1774, as the Revolution drew near, he resigned from the Admiralty Court.

=== American Revolution ===
When active revolution began, he was a member of the New York Provincial Congress, the revolutionary government, from 1775 until 1777. That body, in turn, sent Morris to the Continental Congress for those same years. While in Congress, he was an active supporter of independence and signed the Declaration of Independence in 1776. When warned by his brother Staats Morris, who was a general in the British army, of the consequences that would follow his signing of the rebellious document, Morris stated, "Damn the consequences. Give me the pen."

In 1777, Lewis returned to New York, became a county judge of Westchester County, and was appointed a member of the New York State Senate representing the Southern District, which consisted of Kings, New York, Queens, Richmond, Suffolk and Westchester counties. He served in the 1st New York State Legislature, which began on September 9, 1777, until the end of the 4th Legislature, on July 1, 1781.

His eldest three sons served during the Revolutionary War and had distinguished military careers.

=== Post-Revolution ===
Beginning on July 1, 1783, he returned to the New York State Senate and served in the 7th Legislature through to the end of the 13th Legislature, ending on June 30, 1790. In 1788, when the New York convention met to ratify the U.S. Constitution, he was one of the delegates. Morris was a Federalist presidential elector in the 1796 election and cast his votes for John Adams and Thomas Pinckney.

In 1784, Morris was elected an honorary member of the New York Society of the Cincinnati. On May 1 of the same year, he was appointed to the first Board of Regents of the University of the State of New York and served until his death, when he was replaced by Simeon De Witt.

== Personal life ==
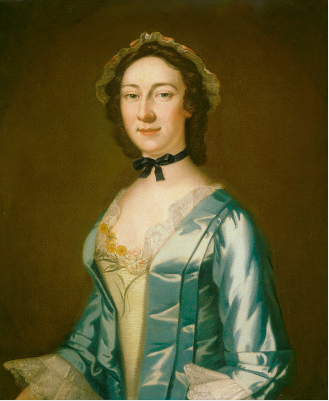
Mary Walton Morris, portrait by John Wollaston

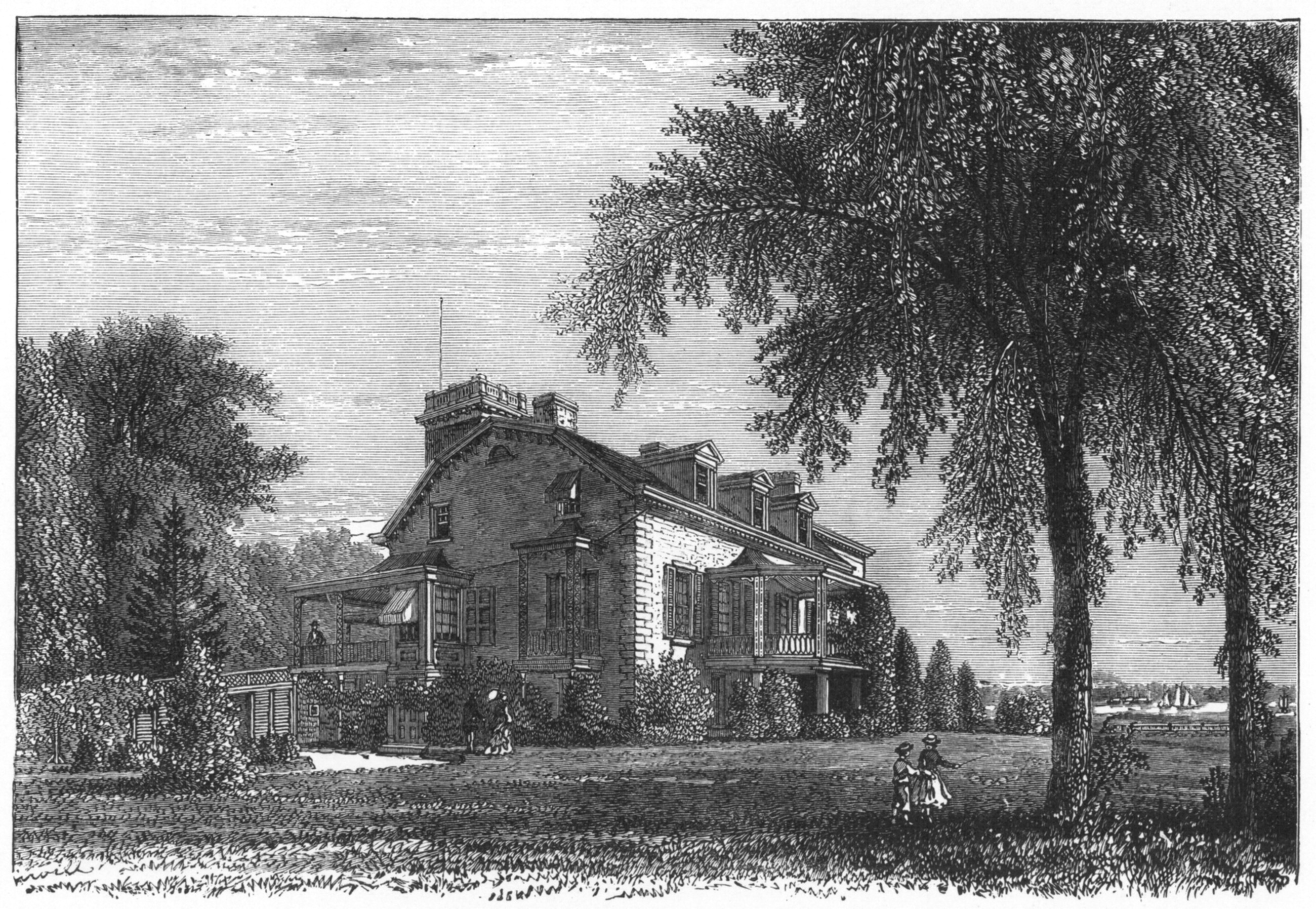
Old Morrisania

On September 24, 1749, Lewis married Mary Walton (1727–1794), a member of a well-known merchant family. Maria was the daughter of Jacob Walton and Maria (née Beekman) Walton. They had ten children:

- Catherine Morris (1751–1835), who married Thomas Lawrence (1744–1823).
- Mary Morris (1752–1776).
- Col. Lewis V. Morris (1754–1824), who married Ann B. Elliott (1762–1848), sister-in-law of Congressman Daniel Huger.
- Gen. Jacob Morris (1755–1844), who married Mary Cox (1758–1827) (Morris, New York is named after him).
- Sarah Morris (born 1757), who died young.
- Lt. William Walton Morris (1760–1832), aide-de-camp to General Anthony Wayne who married Sarah Carpender.
- Helena Magdalena Morris (1762–1840), who married John Rutherfurd (1760–1840), a Senator from New Jersey
- James Morris (1764–1827), who married Helen Van Cortlandt (1768–1812), daughter of Augustus Van Cortlandt and granddaughter of Frederick Van Cortlandt.
- Capt. Staats Morris (1765–1826), who married Everarda van Braam Houckgeest (1765–1816), the daughter of Andreas van Braam Houckgeest and Baroness Catharina C.G. van Reeds van Oudtshoorn.
- Capt. Richard Valentine Morris (1768–1815), who married Anne Walton (1773–1858)

After the war, Morris had to rebuild the family estate, which had been looted and burned by the British when they occupied New York. In 1790, he offered the land, now part of the South Bronx neighborhood of Morrisania, as the site of the U.S. capital. He died on the estate and is buried in the family vault beneath St. Ann's Church in the Bronx.

=== Descendants ===
Through his eldest son, Lewis V. Morris, he was grandfather to Lewis Morris (1785–1863) and Sabina Elliott Morris (1789–1857). Lewis Morris (b. 1785) was the father of Charles Manigault Morris (1820–1895), a Confederate officer. Sabina married her first cousin, Robert Walter Rutherfurd (1788–1852), the son of John Rutherfurd and Helena Morris, and was the mother of Lewis Morris Rutherfurd (1816–1892), a pioneering astrophotographer who took the first telescopic photographs of the moon and sun, as well as many stars and planets.

Through his son, Staats Morris, his great-grandson was Daniel François van Braam Morris (b. 1840), a Dutchman and governor of Celebes in the Dutch East Indies. A great-granddaughter of his grandfather, Lewis Morris, named Mary Antill was married to Gerritt G. Lansing, himself a brother of Congressman John Lansing. John Lansing's daughter, Sarah, was married to Edward Livingston, a great-grandson of Philip Livingston.

== In popular culture ==
Lewis Morris is portrayed by Ronald Kross in the 1969 Broadway musical 1776 and by Howard Caine in the 1972 film. In the fictional account, although Morris was chairman of the New York delegation to the Second Continental Congress, he abstained ("courteously") on every vote, claiming that the New York Provincial Congress never gave Morris explicit instructions on anything. However, when George Washington noted in a dispatch that Morris's estates were destroyed by the British, but his family was taken to safety in Connecticut, Morris abandons his lack of instructions and moves to sign the Declaration.

== See also ==
- Memorial to the 56 Signers of the Declaration of Independence
