= Robert Morris (judge) =

American judge (1745–1815)

Judge of the United States District Court for the District of New Jersey
- In office June 1, 1802 – June 2, 1815
- Appointed by: Operation of law
- Preceded by: Seat established by 2 Stat. 132
- Succeeded by: William Sanford Pennington
- In office August 28, 1790 – February 13, 1801
- Appointed by: George Washington
- Preceded by: David Brearley
- Succeeded by: Seat abolished

Judge of the United States District Court for the Eastern District of New Jersey Judge of the United States District Court for the Western District of New Jersey
- In office February 13, 1801 – June 1, 1802
- Appointed by: Operation of law
- Preceded by: Seat established by 2 Stat. 89
- Succeeded by: Seat abolished

Chief Justice of the Supreme Court of New Jersey
- In office February 5, 1777 – May 25, 1779
- Governor: William Livingston
- Succeeded by: David Brearley

Personal details
- Born: 1745 New Brunswick, Province of New Jersey, British America
- Died: June 2, 1815 (aged 69–70) New Brunswick, New Jersey, United States
- Parent: Robert Hunter Morris (father)
- Relatives: Lewis Morris
- Education: Read law

Robert Morris (1745 – June 2, 1815) was chief justice of the Supreme Court of New Jersey and a United States district judge of the United States District Court for the District of New Jersey, the United States District Court for the Eastern District of New Jersey and the United States District Court for the Western District of New Jersey.

== Education and career ==
Born in 1745, in New Brunswick, Province of New Jersey, British America, Morris read law in 1770. He entered private practice in New Brunswick from 1770 to 1776. On September 6, 1776, by Joint Meeting of the New Jersey Legislature, Morris was appointed Clerk of Bergen County. On February 5, 1777, the Legislature named him Chief Justice of the Supreme Court of New Jersey, the office once held by his father. On November 6, 1778 Morris resigned as Bergen County Clerk. He continued to serve as Chief Justice until his resignation from that office on May 25, 1779. He resumed private practice in New Brunswick from 1779 to 1790.

== Federal judicial service ==
Morris received a recess appointment from President George Washington on August 28, 1790, to a seat on the United States District Court for the District of New Jersey vacated by Judge David Brearley. He was nominated to the same position by President Washington on December 17, 1790. He was confirmed by the United States Senate on December 20, 1790, and received his commission the same day. Morris was reassigned by operation of law to the United States District Court for the Eastern District of New Jersey and the United States District Court for the Western District of New Jersey on February 13, 1801, to a new joint seat authorized by 2 Stat. 89. Morris was reassigned by operation of law to the United States District Court for the District of New Jersey on July 1, 1802, to a new seat authorized by 2 Stat. 132. His service terminated on June 2, 1815, due to his death in New Brunswick.

== Family ==
Morris was the son of New Jersey Chief Justice Robert Hunter Morris and grandson of former Governor Lewis Morris.

== Sources ==
Legal offices
Preceded by David Brearley	Judge of the United States District Court for the District of New Jersey; 1790–1801	Succeeded by Seat abolished
Preceded by Seat established by 2 Stat. 89	Judge of the United States District Court for the Eastern District of New Jersey; Judge of the United States District Court for the Western District of New Jersey; 1801–1802	Succeeded by Seat abolished
Preceded by Seat established by 2 Stat. 132	Judge of the United States District Court for the District of New Jersey; 1802–1815	Succeeded by William Sanford Pennington
