= Robert Hunter (colonial administrator) =

British army officer and colonial administrator (1666–1734)

General Robert Hunter FRS
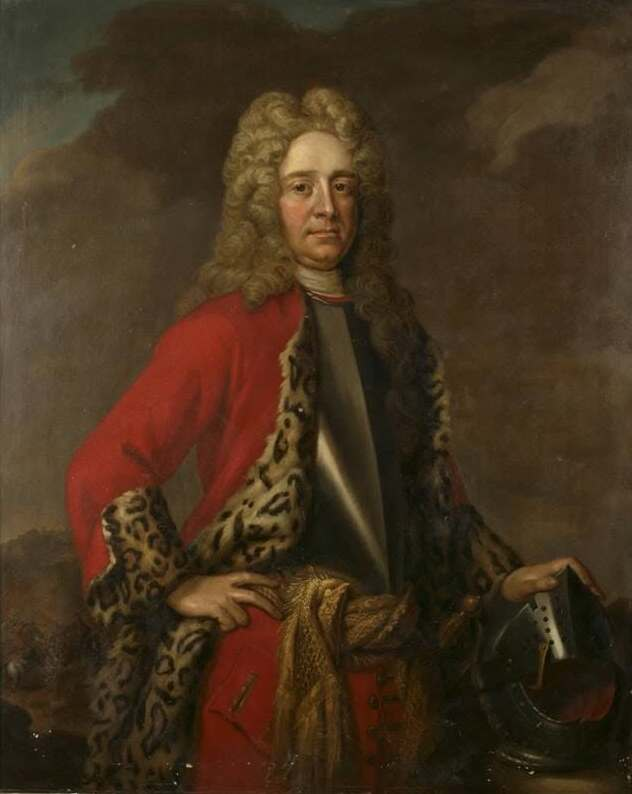
- Portrait attributed to Sir Godfrey Kneller, c. 1720

Lieutenant governor of Virginia
- In office 1707 – Captured at sea by the French; never served
- Monarch: Anne
- Preceded by: Edmund Jenings, President of Council
- Succeeded by: Alexander Spotswood

Governor of New Jersey
- In office June 1710 – 1720
- Monarchs: Anne; George I
- Preceded by: Richard Ingoldesby (Lt. Governor)
- Succeeded by: Lewis Morris, President of Council

Governor of New York
- In office June 1710 – 1719
- Monarchs: Anne; George I
- Preceded by: Richard Ingoldesby (Lt. Governor)
- Succeeded by: Pieter Schuyler, Acting Governor

Governor of Jamaica
- In office 1728 – March 1734
- Monarch: George I
- Preceded by: John Ayscough, President of Council
- Succeeded by: John Ayscough, President of Council

Personal details
- Born: 1666 Edinburgh, Scotland
- Died: 31 March 1734 (aged 67–68) Jamaica, British West Indies
- Occupation: Army officer, governor, playwright

General Robert Hunter FRS (c. 1666 – 31 March 1734) was a British army officer, playwright and colonial administrator who successively served as the governors of New York, New Jersey and Jamaica.

== Early life ==
Hunter's coat of arms

Robert Hunter was born c. 1666 in Edinburgh, Scotland, grandson of Robert Hunter, 20th Laird of Hunterston in Ayrshire, being the son of lawyer James Hunter and his wife Margaret Spalding.

== Career ==
He had been apprenticed to an apothecary before running away to join the Scots Army. He became an officer in 1689 who rose to become a general, and married a woman of high rank.

=== American colonies ===
He was a man of business whose first address to the New Jersey Assembly was barely 300 words long. In it, he stated, "If honesty is the best policy, plainness must be the best oratory."

He was appointed Lieutenant Governor of Virginia in 1707, but was captured by a corsair on his way to Virginia, taken to France, and in 1709 exchanged for the French Bishop of Quebec. He was then appointed Governor of New York and sailed to America with 3,000 Palatine refugees as settlers in 1710. In 1715 he advocated the local minting of copper coins, but the king refused. Governor Hunter's philosophy was that "the true Interests of the People and Government are the same, I mean A Government of Laws. No other deserves the Name, and are never Separated or Separable but in Imagination by Men of Craft."

Hunter was succeeded as Governor by Pieter Schuyler as acting governor from 1719 to 1720 and finally by William Burnet, whose post as Comptroller of Customs was given to Hunter in exchange.

=== Jamaica ===
Hunter was then Governor of Jamaica from 1727 until his death on 31 March 1734. While in Jamaica, Hunter waged an unsuccessful war against the Jamaican Maroons. He was a member of the Society for the Propagation of the Gospel. He was elected a Fellow of the Royal Society in May 1709.

== Personal life ==
Hunter was married to Elizabeth (née Orby) Hay, the daughter of Sir Thomas Orby, 1st Baronet of Croyland. Elizabeth was the widow of Brig.-Gen. Lord John Hay, son of John Hay, 2nd Marquess of Tweeddale. Together, they were the parents of at least one son and three daughters (Henrietta Hunter, Catherine (née Hunter) Sloper, Charlotte Hunter), including:

- Thomas Orby Hunter (c. 1716–1769), MP for Winchelsea who married Jacomina Caroline Bullenden, the daughter of Colonel William Bullenden.

Hunter died on 31 March 1734 in Jamaica, West Indies.

=== Playwriting ===
His play, Androboros, written in 1714, was the first known play to be written and published in the North American British Colonies.

== See also ==
- List of colonial governors of New Jersey
- List of colonial governors of New York
- Androboros

Government offices
Preceded by Edmund Jenings	Governor of the Province of Virginia; 1707–1709	Succeeded by 1st Earl of Orkney
Preceded by Richard Ingoldesby	Governor of the Province of New Jersey; 1710–1720	Succeeded by William Burnet
Preceded by Gerardus Beekman (acting)	Governor of the Province of New York; 1710–1719	Succeeded by Pieter Schuyler (acting)
Preceded by John Ayscough (acting)	Governor of Jamaica; 1728–1734	Succeeded by John Ayscough (acting)
