= Lewis Morris (governor) =

American politician (1671–1746)

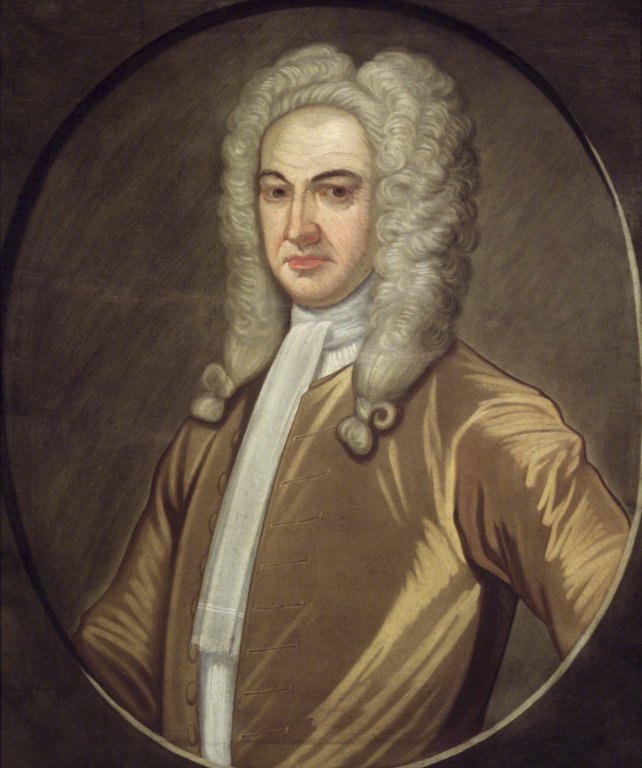
- Portrait by John Watson

8th Colonial Governor of New Jersey
- In office 1738–1746
- Monarch: George II
- Preceded by: John Hamilton as Acting Governor
- Succeeded by: John Hamilton as Acting Governor

Chief Justice of the New York Supreme Court
- In office 1715–1733
- Preceded by: Roger Mompesson
- Succeeded by: James De Lancey

Personal details
- Born: 15 October 1671 Morrisania, Province of New York, British America
- Died: 21 May 1746 (aged 74) Kingsbury, Province of New Jersey, British America
- Spouse: Isabella Graham (m. 1691)
- Children: Euphemia, Mary, Sarah, Lewis, Robert, Anne, Arabella, Isabella, Margaret, Elizabeth, John, Daniel, Nancy, James
- Parent(s): Richard Morris; Sarah Pole Morris

Lewis Morris (October 15, 1671 – May 21, 1746) was an American politician from the colonial period, who was chief justice of New York and British governor of New Jersey, was the first lord of the manor of Morrisania in New York City (in what is now the Bronx).

== Early life ==
Born on the estate of his parents, Richard Morris (originally from Monmouthshire, Wales) and Sarah (Pole) Morris in 1671, this Lewis Morris was the first in a lengthy string of men with the same name to inherit the prominent estate of Morrisania in the southwest section of today's Bronx. Richard and Sarah moved their estate from Barbados to the Bronx after buying the estate from Samuel Edsall in 1670 when it was still known as Broncksland. As the name suggests, Broncksland was the original settlement of Jonas Bronck and his wife, for whom the borough is named. In the fall of 1672, both Richard and Sarah died, leaving only the infant Lewis, barely a year old, as the lord of the manor.

Although the manor was left in the trust of five prominent Westchester citizens until Lewis could rightfully inherit the estate, Matthias Nicoll, secretary of the colony, sent word to Colonel Lewis Morris, the infant's uncle in Barbados. Col. Lewis immediately made plans to move to Morrisania to care for his young nephew and his nephew's estate, which had been somewhat embezzled. Col. Lewis made great pains to secure his nephew's lost property, including a few slaves that had been captured and resold. He was even successful in petitioning for an additional land grant with the help of family friend, Walter Webley. When the childless Col. Lewis and his wife, Mary, died, the now fully-grown Lewis inherited the estate in 1691.

== Career ==
=== New Jersey ===
Lewis Morris showed a passion for politics from an early age, and first appears on the political scene in 1692, serving in the East New Jersey Provincial Council during the administration of Governor Andrew Hamilton. After the late 1690s the government of East and West Jersey became increasingly dysfunctional. This ultimately resulted in the surrender by the Proprietors of East Jersey and those of West Jersey of the right of government to Queen Anne. Anne's government united the two colonies as the Province of New Jersey, a royal colony, establishing a new system of government.

On July 29, 1703, in the instructions to Governor Viscount Cornbury Morris was appointed to the New Jersey Provincial Council, and would serve, with several suspensions, through the administrations of seven governors. During much of this time Morris was President of Council.

Morris and Cornbury soon found themselves at opposition, and Cornbury responded by suspending Morris from the upper house. The first time, in September 1704, Morris apologized to the governor and was reinstated, but in December 1704 Cornbury suspended him.

Morris was elected to a seat in the New Jersey General Assembly in 1707, representing an at-large constituency within the Eastern Division of New Jersey. After the recall of Cornbury by the Crown, Lewis Morris was reinstated to the Council in the June 27, 1708, instructions to Baron Lovelace; Lovelace died eleven months later, and Morris was again suspended, this time by Lt. Gov. Richard Ingoldesby.

Morris was again reinstated to the Council in the instructions to Governor Robert Hunter, with whom he had a good relationship.

Sir William Cosby, who served as governor of New York and New Jersey (as did all governors beginning with Viscount Cornbury), showed little interest in New Jersey politics, started a feud with Morris because of a decision of the New York Supreme Court. Morris was Chief Justice, and wrote a dissenting minority opinion which Cosby found deeply offensive. Cosby recommended Morris' removal from the New Jersey Council on February 5, 1735.

In 1738, New Jersey petitioned the crown for a distinct administration from New York, and Lewis Morris served as Governor of New Jersey until his death in 1746.

=== New York ===
On March 16, 1715, Morris was appointed Chief Justice of New York. When William Cosby was appointed Governor of New York and New Jersey in 1732, his opponents were called "Morrisites" as Lewis Morris was a prominent critic. In 1733 Morris presided over the case of Cosby v. Van Dam. Although the case was decided in favor of Gov. Cosby, Morris wrote the minority opinion, which infuriated Cosby. Cosby demanded the written opinion from Morris. Morris complied with the Governor, but also had the opinion printed for public distribution, along with an explanatory letter stating,

If judges are to be intimidated so as not to dare to give any opinion, but what is pleasing to the Governor, and agreeable to his private views, the people of this province who are very much concerned both with respect to their lives and fortunes in the freedom and independency of those who are to judge them, may possibly not think themselves so secure in either of them as the laws of his Majesty intended they should be.

This even further angered Cosby, who removed Morris from the court. His dismissal led directly to the John Peter Zenger trial affirming freedom of speech in the United States.

== Personal life ==
On November 3, 1691, Morris was married to Isabella Graham (1673–1752), the eldest daughter of James Graham, who served as Speaker of the New York General Assembly and Recorder of New York City. Together, they were the parents of:

- Mary Morris (1695–c. 1746), who married Capt. Vincent Pearse, commander of HMS Phoenix.
- Sarah Morris (1697–1736), who married Michael Kearney (1667–1741), the treasurer of the Province of East New Jersey.
- Lewis Morris Jr. (1698–1762), who married Katrintje "Catherine" Staats (1697–1731). After her death, he married Sarah Gouverneur (1714–1786).
- Robert Hunter Morris (1700–1764), who served as New Jersey Chief Justice.
- Anne Morris (1706–1781), who married Edward Antrill (1701–1770). They were the parents of Lt. Col. Edward Antill.
- Arabella Morris (b. 1708), who married her first cousin, James Graham III (1704–1767).
- Isabella Morris (b. c. 1705), who married Richard Ashfield (1695–1742).
- Euphemia Morris (c. 1710–1756), who married Capt. Matthew Norris, son of Sir John Norris, and grandson of Matthew Aylmer, 1st Baron Aylmer.
- Margaret Morris (b. c. 1711), who married Isaac Willett (1706–1774).
- Elizabeth Morris (1712–1784), who married Col. Anthony White III (1717–1787). They were the parents of Brig. Gen. Anthony Walton White.
- John Morris (-1737), a Surrogate of Monmouth County NJ in 1733. Father of Lieut. John Morris and Ann Morris. Who died young.
- Nancy Morris, who died young.
- James Morris
- Daniel Morris(1702-1784)

Gov. Lewis Morris died on May 21, 1746, in Kingsbury (near Trenton). His remains are in the Morris family crypt at St. Ann's Church in the Bronx.

=== Legacy and descendants ===
Through his children, he was the grandfather of many prominent Americans, including Lewis Morris (1726–1798), a signer of the Declaration of Independence; Gen. Staats Long Morris (1728–1800); New York Chief Justice Richard Morris; New Jersey Chief Justice Robert Morris (1745-1815); and U.S. Senator and Founding Father Gouverneur Morris (1752–1816).

=== Places Named after Morris ===
- Morris County, New Jersey
- Morristown, New Jersey
- Morris Township, New Jersey
- Morris Plains, New Jersey
- Lewis Morris County Park, New Jersey
