= Nicoll =

Nicoll is a surname. Notable people with the surname include:

- Adele Nicoll (born 1996), Welsh shot putter, discus thrower and bobsledder
- Alexander Nicoll (1793–1828), a Scottish orientalist
- Allardyce Nicoll (1894–1976), British literary scholar and teacher
- Archibald Nicoll (1886–1953), a New Zealand artist
- Ashley Holzer (born 1963 as Ashley Nicoll), Canadian-American equestrian
- Audrey Nicoll (born 1961), Scottish politician
- Bruce Nicoll (1851–1904), Australian politician
- Charles Gounter Nicoll (1704–1733), British politician
- Charnze Nicoll-Klokstad (born 1995), New Zealand rugby league player
- Courtlandt Nicoll (1880–1938), New York state senator
- Dave Nicoll (1944–2023), English motocross racer
- David Nicoll (anarchist) (1859–1919), British anarchist
- David Nicoll (footballer), Scottish footballer
- De Lancey Nicoll (1854–1931), New York lawyer
- Donald Nicoll (1820–1891), British politician and businessman
- Fergus Nicoll, broadcaster and journalist
- Francis Nicoll (1771–1835), Church of Scotland senior
- Helen Nicoll (1937–2012), English children's author
- Henry Nicoll (politician) (1812–1879), United States Representative from New York
- Henry Nicoll (cricketer) (1883–1948), Scottish cricketer
- Henry Nicoll (equestrian) (1908–1999), British equestrian
- Ian Nicoll (born 1946), Australian rules footballer
- Jackson Nicoll (born 2003), American actor
- James Nicoll (born 1961), Canadian freelance game and speculative fiction reviewer
- James Henderson Nicoll (1863–1921), Scottish paediatric surgeon
- Jessica Nicoll, American museum director and curator
- John Nicoll (chronicler) (c.1590–1668), Scottish chronicler
- John Cochran Nicoll (1793–1863), United States federal judge
- John Fearns Nicoll (1899–1981), British colonial administrator
- Kurt Nicoll (born 1964), English motocross racer
- Logan Nicoll, American politician
- Lorelei Nicoll, Canadian politician
- Marion Nicoll (1909–1985), Canadian painter
- Matthias Nicoll (1630–1687), sixth mayor of New York City
- Matthias Nicoll Jr. (1868–1941), American physician
- Maurice Nicoll (1884–1953), Scottish neurologist and esoteric teacher
- Mercedes Nicoll (born 1983), Canadian snowboarder
- Michael John Nicoll (1880–1925), British ornithologist
- Murray Nicoll (1943– 2010), Australian journalist and broadcaster
- Nathaniel Lee Nicoll, American musician, founder of the band B! Machine
- Richard Nicoll (1977–2016), English fashion designer
- Robert Nicoll (1814–1837), Scottish poet
- Roger Nicoll (born 1941), American neuroscientist
- Terry Nicoll (1933–2024), Australian modern pentathlete
- Thomas Nicoll (cricketer, born 1770) (1770–1841), English cricketer
- Thomas Nicoll (cricketer, born 1798) (1798–1883), English cricketer
- Whitlock Nicoll (1786–1838), English physician
- William Nicoll (politician, born 1657) (1657–1723), English-born American merchant and politician
- William Nicoll Jr. (1702–1768), English-American merchant and politician
- William M. Nicoll (1893–1970), Scottish-American lawyer, politician, and judge
- William Robertson Nicoll (1851–1923), Scottish editor

== Given name ==
- Nicoll Fosdick (1785–1868), American merchant and politician
- Nicoll Halsey (1782–1865), American politician

== Places ==
- Nicoll Highway, a road in Singapore
- Nicoll Highway MRT station, a place in Singapore
