= William Nicoll =

William Nicoll may refer to:

- William Nicoll (politician, born 1657) (1657–1723), English-born American merchant and politician who served as the Speaker of the New York General Assembly
- William Nicoll Jr. (1702–1768), English-American merchant and politician who served as the Speaker of the New York General Assembly, son of the above
- Sir William Robertson Nicoll (1851–1923), Scottish Free Church minister, journalist and editor
- William M. Nicoll (1893–1970), Scottish-American lawyer, politician, and judge from New York

== See also ==
- William Nicol (disambiguation)
- William Nichol (disambiguation)
