= John Lawrence (New York politician) =

Mayor of New York City in 1673 and 1691

7th and 20th Mayor of New York City
- In office 1691–1691
- Preceded by: Peter Delanoy
- Succeeded by: Abraham de Peyster
- In office 1673–1674
- Preceded by: Matthias Nicoll
- Succeeded by: Matthias Nicoll

Personal details
- Born: 1618 St Albans, Hertfordshire, England
- Died: 1699 (aged 80–81)
- Spouse: Susanna Lawrence

John Lawrence (1618–1699) was Mayor of New York City in 1673, and again in 1691.

== Life ==
Thomas Lawrence, the first known Lawrence to arrive in the United States, landed at Plymouth, Massachusetts in 1635. He later moved to Ipswich, Massachusetts, and later yet to Long Island. In 1644, he was one of the patentees of Hempstead under grant by Dutch Colonial Governor Willem Kieft. In 1645, Kieft granted the patent of Flushing to Lawrence and 16 others, which was confirmed by English Colonial Governor Richard Nicolls in 1666.

In 1658, Lawrence moved to New Amsterdam. New Amsterdam was renamed New York on September 8, 1664, in honor of the Duke of York (later James II of England), in whose name the English had captured it.

In 1663, Lawrence was appointed by Governor Pieter Stuyvesant as a Commissioner to negotiate with the General Court at Hartford to determine the boundary between New England and New Netherland.

Thomas' brother John Lawrence was one of the first aldermen of New York City when the city was incorporated in 1665.

John Lawrence was sworn in as Mayor of New York City in 1673, but his term was cut short when the Dutch conquered the city that July during the Third Anglo-Dutch War. Lawrence was appointed as mayor for a second time in 1691. He was a justice of the Supreme Court of the Province of New York from 1692 until his death.

== Marriage and children ==
John Lawrence married Susanna, and they had six children, among them John Lawrence who married Mrs. Sarah Willett; Susanna Lawrence who was married first to Mayor Gabriel Minvielle, and second to Alderman William Smith; and Mary (daughter of John Lawrence) who married William Whittinghame in 1660.

Mary, a daughter by this marriage, was distinguished by her literary acquirements, and the gifts she bestowed upon Harvard and Yale Colleges. She was the wife of Gurdon Saltonstall, governor of Connecticut, and died 1730.

== Sources ==
- Historical Genealogy of the Lawrence Family by Thomas Lawrence (1858; pages 21f)
- History of Thomas Lawrence
- List of mayors of New York City Mayors of New York City
- Historical Genealogy of the Lawrence Family Pdf
