= William Dervall =

Mayor of New York City from 1675 to 1676

9th Mayor of New York City
- In office October 17, 1675 – October 14, 1676
- Preceded by: Matthias Nicoll
- Succeeded by: Nicholas De Mayer

Personal details
- Born: 4 September 1642 (baptism) Amsterdam, Netherlands
- Died: ca 1711 New York City

William or Willem Dervall (1642 – c. 1711) was a Dutch-born Mayor of New York City from October 17, 1675 until October 14, 1676.

== Biography ==
Dervall (Note: Dervall's signature read "Wm. Darvall". "Dervall" is most commonly seen in later documents, while other contemporary variations include "Darval", "Darvell", "Der Val", "Derval", "Dervell", and "Derwall".) was the son of Frans Jorisz Derval, a wealthy timber merchant in Amsterdam originating from Wijchen. In September 1665, Willem had found his way to the East Coast of the United States, as the English Governor Nicolls issued him a letter of denization and granted him permission to trade anywhere in the English colonies of America.

Dervall and his fellow merchant and (supposed) brother Jan/John arrived in 1667 from Boston to New York City and set up a store on the corner of Whitehall Street and Pearl Street. He did good business, sending from time to time large quantities of goods to his brother Cornelis in Amsterdam.

In September 1670, Willem married Rebecca Delavall, daughter of Thomas Delavall, Mayor of New York in 1666, 1670 and 1678, with whom he appears to have had just one child, a daughter Frances in 1681.

In 1673-1674, when the Dutch retook the city for half a year during the Third Anglo-Dutch War, Derval lost quite a bit when Anthony Colve confiscated the property of representatives of Charles II of England and the Duke of York. After Thomas Delavall's death in 1682, Dervall inherited Great Barent Island, now named Wards Island, and a large estate in Harlem. He later served as an alderman in the City Council.

== Family ==
Dervall was the one but youngest of a family of 14 children of Aagtje Huijgens (c. 1599–1652) and Frans Jorisz Derval (c. 1596–1669), who married in February 1624 in Amsterdam. (Note: Dervall's father signed his name in Dutch ("Frans Jorisse"), for example at his weddings, and was from Wichem/Wichum, an old spelling of Wijchen in Gelderland in the Dutch Republic. He and Aegtje, who was from Utrecht, baptized nine of their children, including Willem, at the Dutch Reformed Oude Kerk, but also five at the English Presbyterian Church, where his son Joris was e.g. baptized "George", perhaps feeding the narrative that there was British ancestry.) His brother Joris (born 1631) was in 1671 a colonist in Torarica, in Suriname. Jan/Johannes/John Dervall, who also used the surname "de Witt", married in November 1675 with Catharine van Courtlandt. After Jan's death in February 1689, Catharine remarried Jan's business partner, Colonel Frederick Philipse in 1692. In contrast, the aforementioned brother Cornelis Darvall (1640–1721), lived his whole live in Amsterdam, where he was a powerful merchant. To wit, Cornelis is thought to have arranged the quick release of Jacob Leisler, after Leisler and other New York citizens had been captured by Moorish pirates on a voyage to Europe in 1678; the other captives had to wait for over a year before New York Governor Edmund Andros could forward their ransom.

== See also ==
- List of mayors of New York City
