= William Nicoll Jr. =

American politician

Speaker of the New York General Assembly
- In office January 31, 1759 – February 6, 1768
- Preceded by: David Jones
- Succeeded by: Philip Livingston

Personal details
- Born: 1702 Province of New York, British America
- Died: 1768 (aged 65–66) Province of New York, British America
- Parent(s): William Nicoll; Anna Van Rensselaer Nicoll

William Nicoll Jr. (1702 – 1768) was an English-American colonial merchant and politician who served as the Speaker of the New York General Assembly.

== Early life ==
He was a son of English-born politician William Nicoll (1657–1723) (who is remembered for his vehement opposition to the Leisler Rebellion) and Anna (née Van Rensselaer) Nicoll (1665–1723), widow of the patroon Kiliaen van Rensselaer, and daughter of Jeremias van Rensselaer and Maria (née Van Cortlandt) Van Rensselaer. Among his siblings was Mary Nicoll, wife of Robert Watts; Benjamin Nicoll, husband of Charity Floyd; Catherine Nicoll, wife of Jonathan Havens; and Frances Nicoll, wife of Edward Holland, the 40th mayor of New York City.

His paternal grandparents were Abigail (née Johns) Nicoll and Matthias Nicoll, one of the two leaders of the expedition that led to the surrender of the Dutch New Amsterdam to the English, who served as the 6th Mayor of New York City from 1672 to 1673 and Speaker in the first and second sessions of the New York Assembly under Thomas Dongan in 1683. His grand-uncle was Richard Nicolls, the 1st Colonial governor of the Province of New York. His paternal aunt, Margaret Nicoll, was married to Col. Richard Floyd Jr., the colonel of provincial troops of Suffolk County and judge of the Court of Common Pleas and grandfather of William Floyd.

== Career ==
His father was granted a royal patent of 50,000 acres on the Long Island by Governor Thomas Dongan in November 1683, later receiving further land grants making Plandome Manor the largest on Long Island totaling 100 square miles (260 km^{2}).

Nicoll was elected a member of the New York General Assembly, representing Suffolk County, in 1739 and, like his father, served until his death in 1768. From January 31, 1759, until February 6, 1768, he also served as the Speaker of the Assembly. During his service as Speaker, the 18th Assembly was dissolved for a short period of time upon the death of George II which occurred on October 25, 1760.

== Personal life ==
As Nicoll died unmarried and without issue, the Nicoll estate was inherited by his nephew, William Nicoll III (d. 1778), the eldest son of Benjamin, who became the forth family member to be elected to the General Assembly where he served from 1768 until 1769.
