= Thomas Nicoll =

Thomas Nicoll may refer to:

- Thomas Nicoll (cricketer, born 1770) (1770–1841), English cricketer
- Thomas Nicoll (cricketer, born 1798) (1798–1883), English cricketer
