= John Watts (1715–1789) =

American politician

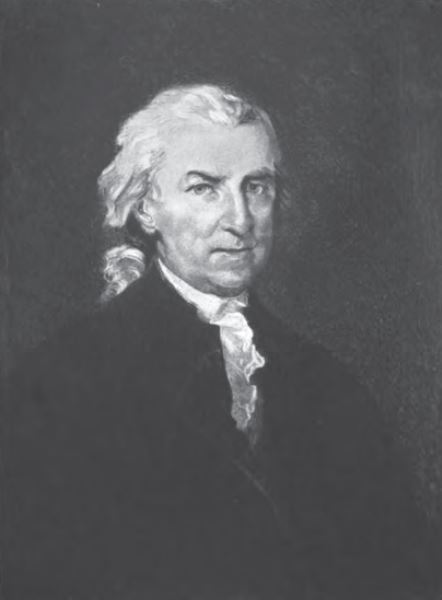

President of the Saint Andrew's Society of the State of New York
- In office 1771–1772
- Preceded by: The Earl of Dunmore
- Succeeded by: William McAdam

Personal details
- Born: April 16, 1715 New York City, Province of New York, British America
- Died: August 15, 1789 (aged 74) Wales
- Spouse: Anne DeLancey (m. 1742; died 1775)
- Relations: William Nicoll (grandfather)
- Children: John Watts
- Parent(s): Robert Watts; Mary Nicoll Watts

John Watts (April 16, 1715 – August 15, 1789) was a Scottish-American businessman and landowner.

== Early life ==
Coat of Arms of John Watts

Watts was born on April 16, 1715, in New York City. He was the son and fourth child born to Mary (née Nicoll) Watts (b. 1689) and Robert Watts (1678–1750), an immigrant to New York City from Scotland at the close of the 1600s. In 1715, colonial Governor Hunter appointed him to the board of the "Lords of Trade" of the city of New York.

His paternal grandfather was John Watts and his family's seat was Rose Hill, then in the suburbs of Edinburgh. His maternal grandparents were William Nicoll, Speaker of the New York General Assembly (and son of mayor Matthias Nicoll), and Anne (née Van Rensselaer) Nicoll. His grandmother was a widow of Kiliaen van Rensselaer and a daughter of Jeremias van Rensselaer, acting patroon of Rensselaerwyck.

== Career ==
Watts, one of the most prominent and wealthy landowners in the colonies and was one of the original subscribers to the Tontine Coffee House. He served as president of His Majesty's council of New York from 1758 to 1776, and a member of the New York General Assembly from 1752 to 1759. It has been said that if the Revolution failed, Watts would have been the chosen Lieutenant Governor of New York and Acting Secretary of the Province.

In 1754, he was one of the original founders and trustees of the New York Society Library. He was also a founder and original member of the Saint Andrew's Society of the State of New York, serving as its president from 1771 to 1772, and as the first president of the New York City Hospital in 1760.

As the American Revolution approached, Watts and his wife, both Loyalists, went to Wales in 1775 where his wife died a few months later. In 1779, his properties, including his "Rose Hill" estate (which today is occupied by Fordham University), were seized by the New York State Legislature.

== Personal life ==
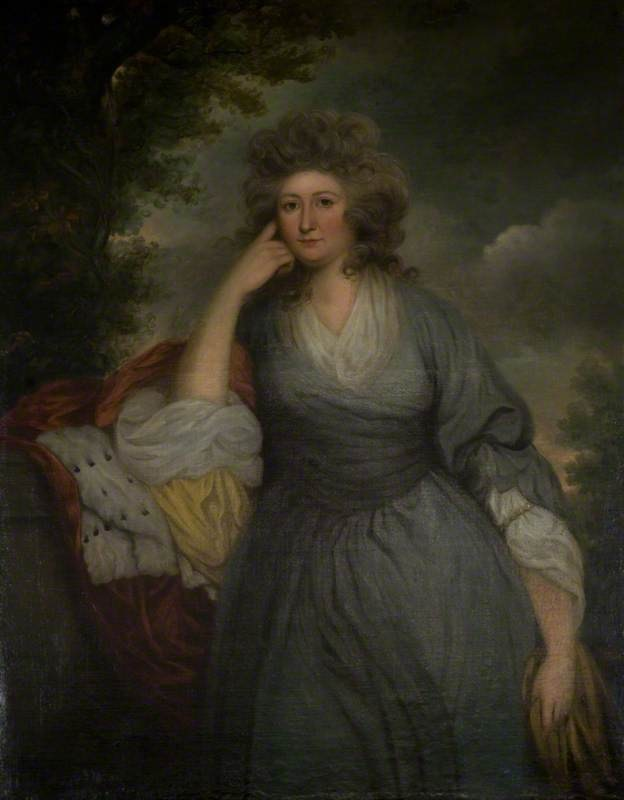
Portrait of his daughter, Countess Anne Watts Kennedy, wife of Archibald Kennedy, 11th Earl of Cassilis, by Mather Brown.

In July 1742, Watts was married to Anne DeLancey (1723–1775), daughter of Anne (née van Cortlandt) DeLancey and Étienne de Lancy, a minor member of the French nobility. Her maternal grandparents were Geertruy Schuyler and Stephanus van Cortlandt, the Chief Justice of the Province of New York, and among her siblings was New York Governor James DeLancey and fellow loyalist Oliver DeLancey. Together, they were the parents of:

- Robert Watts (1743–1814), who married Mary Alexander, eldest daughter of William Alexander, Lord Stirling.
- Anne Watts (1744–1783), who married Archibald Kennedy, 11th Earl of Cassilis.
- Susanna Watts (1749–1823), who married Philip Kearny III (1733–1798).
- John Watts (1749–1836) who became a U.S. Representative, and married his cousin Jane Delancey.
- Mary Nicoll Watts (1751–1815), who married Sir John Johnson, 2nd Baronet.
- Stephen Watts, who was married to Sarah Nugent (1754–1841).
- Margaret Watts (born 1753), who was married to Robert William Leake.

Watts died in Wales on August 15, 1789, and was buried in St James's Church, Piccadilly, London. After the War ended, his sons Robert and John petitioned for the attainder of their properties to be overturned, and were unsuccessful, but were allowed to buy back his properties in 1784, which included vast holdings in ships, mills, factories, banks, and investment houses.

=== Descendants ===
Through their children, the Watts became ancestors of the Marquess of Ailsa in Scotland, the Duke of Grafton and the Viscount Daventry in England.

Through his daughter Susanna, he was the grandfather of Major General Stephen Watts Kearny (1794–1848) and great-grandfather of Gen. Philip Kearny (1815–1862), a United States Army officer notable for his leadership in the Mexican–American War and American Civil War who was killed in action in the 1862 Battle of Chantilly.
