= Thomas Delavall =

American politician and businessman

2nd, 5th and 12th Mayor of New York City
- In office 1678–1679
- Preceded by: Stephanus Van Cortlandt
- Succeeded by: Francis Rombouts
- In office 1671–1672
- Preceded by: Cornelius Van Steenwyk
- Succeeded by: Matthias Nicoll
- In office 1666–1667
- Preceded by: Thomas Willett
- Succeeded by: Thomas Willett

Personal details
- Born: 1620 London, England
- Died: 1682 (aged 61–62) New York City

Thomas Delavall (also spelled Delaval or DeLavall; 1620 – 1682) was an English-born official and businessman in the Thirteen Colonies. He was appointed the second, fifth, and twelfth Mayor of New York City in 1666, 1671, and 1678 respectively.

== Career ==
Born in London, England, Delavall first came to America in 1664 as an officer in Richard Nicolls' army, which he later accompanied in the Invasion of New York City. Often referred to as "Captain", he had since become a prominent citizen in the community. He owned a large amount of real estate around the colony, such as houses in New York City and Kingston, along with a mill in Yonkers, and land in Gravesend. Delavall was first appointed Receiver-General of New York City in 1664. He was a member of the Governor's Council of Advisors in 1667, and a judge of the province in 1679.

He was appointed the second mayor of New York City in 1666, succeeding Thomas Willett. He would be reappointed again in 1671, and lastly again in 1678.

== Death and heirs ==
Delavall's daughter married William Dervall, another future mayor of the city. Delavall died in 1682 shortly after writing his will.
