= Thomas Willett =

1st and 3rd Mayor of New York City (1665–66, 1667–68)

1st and 3rd Mayor of New York City
- In office June 1667 – June 1668
- Preceded by: Thomas Delavall
- Succeeded by: Cornelius Van Steenwyk
- In office June 1665 – June 1666
- Preceded by: Office established
- Succeeded by: Thomas Delavall

Personal details
- Born: c. 1610 England or the Netherlands
- Died: August 4, 1674 Swansea, Plymouth Colony (now approximately Riverside, Rhode Island)
- Resting place: Little Neck Cemetery

Thomas Willett (c. 1610 – August 4, 1674) was a Plymouth Colony fur trader, merchant, land purchaser and developer, Captain of the Plymouth Colony militia, Magistrate of the colony, and was the first Mayor of New York, prior to the consolidation of the five boroughs into the City of New York in 1898.

== Career ==
=== Plymouth Colony fur trade ===
The early years of the Plymouth Colony were marked by severe economic crises and challenges. Incremental progress was made as the colonists learned the Native Americans' method of raising corn and beans, cattle were imported from England and multiplied, and some trade in wampum and other goods was established. However, the major contribution to placing the colony on a firm financial basis and finally paying its debt to its financial "Adventurers" in London was made by exporting furs, primarily of beaver to be used in making hats.

The first record of Willett's long career is probably that of William Bradford regarding the establishment of a second main trading post for the Plymouth Colony on the Penobscot River in what is now Maine in 1629. The Plymouth Colony was reluctantly joining in this effort, initiated by Isaac Allerton, in order to protect their established trading post on the Kennebunk River. Willett is thought to be the "honest young man" recently arrived with the second and last major group from John Robinson's Leyden congregation who was given the task of monitoring the activities of Edward Ashley, the man placed in charge of the trading post by Allerton. This "young man being discreet, and one (Willett) whom they could trust, they so instructed as kept Ashley ... within bounds". It is definitely known that Willett, among others, was deposed and Ashley and the depositions were transported to England for trial in July 1631 after Ashley was arrested and accused of trading arms and ammunition with Native Americans.

In 1631, the trading post was robbed of just about anything of value by the French while the "master of the house" was away meeting a supply ship. Willett was in charge of the trading post when the French again robbed it in 1635 and evicted the English; a subsequent effort to recapture it using a ship commanded by a Captain Girling was futile, and the colony gave up the Penobscot post permanently. An account of the expulsion of the English from Penobscot and the subsequent attempt to regain it from the French point of view exists in a letter from Sieur D'Aulney to Governor John Endecott of Massachusetts. Willett's early and continuing experiences in the fur trade provided valuable skills in native languages and frontier trade for use in his later career.

Willett remained active in the colony's remaining fur trading efforts, including being appointed to a committee in 1637 to advise the governor concerning the decline in the trade, and in 1649 and again in 1656, with others, taking over the remaining trading post on the Kennebunk River. He probably spent little time at the Kennebunk River trading post given his other activities, but Winthrop recorded one incident where a potential theft or worse by some Native Americans was thwarted by Willett in 1639.

=== Landowner in Plymouth ===
Willett was "Admitted to the freedom of this society" (i.e., recognized as a full citizen, or "freeman") in 1633/4 and married Mary Browne on July 6, 1636. He received several grants of land from the colony in 1638/9 and 1640 plus six acres in 1640 for a houselot. As the years passed, he assumed more and more responsibility in the colony including becoming the co-captain of the colony's military company (with Myles Standish) in 1647/8; he remained in this post after Standish retired and for almost all of the remainder of his life. His initial appointment as Assistant to the Governor was in 1651; and he was reappointed to that post many times in the following years.

=== Merchant and land development ===
Willett's initial beginning as a merchant in addition to the continuing involvement in the fur trade may have come in 1641/2 when he furnished a sixteenth portion of the construction cost to build a 40–50 ton bark (ship). In time he became the major merchant in the lucrative trade with the Dutch colony of New Amsterdam (later New York) where his early knowledge of the Dutch language and customs was of great advantage. His later merchant activities included at least some trade with Virginia and across the Atlantic.

Willett's abilities in the native languages led to his becoming a trusted translator and to establishing friendships among the Native Americans, particularly with the principal leaders of the Pokanokets, who were led successively by Massasoit, and his sons Wamsutta (or Alexander) and Metacom (known as Prince Phillip). (The Pokanokets today are usually referred to as members of a larger group of Native Americans, the Wampanoag.) The colony's desire for more land to accommodate its growing population and the desire for more economic activity, combined with the Pokanokets' desire for English goods, led to a series of land purchases from them, notably in the western part of the colony. Willett's father-in-law, John Browne, was among the founders of Taunton in 1640, and Browne's and Willett's involvement continued in further purchases along and near the eastern coast and northern reaches of Narragansett Bay. Willett had moved to this western area of the colony and became involved in the affairs of Rehoboth by the early 1650s, serving in numerous capacities, particularly after the death of Browne in 1662. Willett was authorized to purchase further land from the Native Americans in 1662 and again in 1668 and 1669; these purchases led enlargement of Rehoboth and Swansey (Swansea, originally Wannamoisett). An example of a deed between the Native Americans and a group of purchasers involving Browne and Willett can be found in a history of the town of Swansea. An extensive history of the early land purchases in Pokanoket area, including those involving Willett, has been compiled by Bicknell including a map showing historical names.

Willett became a part owner with other prominent men, including his father-in-law and a son-in-law, John Saffin, of a large development consortium, the Atherton Company, leading to interests in properties in a number of the early New England towns. Willett was appointed with others to settle a dispute between the colonies of Plymouth and Rhode Island over ownership of Hog Island in Narragansett Bay in 1658/9.

Willett's trade with New Nederland led to further involvement with that colony. In 1650 he was entrusted, along with the English secretary to Peter Stuyvesant, to represent New Nederland in settling its border with the English colony of Connecticut (this link shows the 1650 boundary established, along with those of later surveys, see also New Haven Colony).

=== English acquisition of New Amsterdam from the Dutch ===
Accompanying the English commander Richard Nicolls, Willett contributed to the peaceful surrender of New Amsterdam to the English on September 7, 1664. Willett had informed the Dutch that an expedition by the English was pending, and he was a member of the English party that entered New Amsterdam under a flag of truce on September 2 to attempt to persuade Governor Stuyvesant and the Dutch to surrender peacefully. This eventually happened.

Largely because of his knowledge of the native languages, Willett very soon thereafter accompanied a successful negotiating party north to the Iroquois to secure for the English the excellent relations that the Iroquois had maintained with the Dutch. Colonel Richard Nicholls, who was given command of the transfer from Dutch to English governance, sent a request to Thomas Prence, then governor of the Plymouth Colony, that Willett be relieved of his duties to that colony so that he could assist in the transfer. His letter stated that "Mr. Willett was more acquainted with the manners and customs of the Dutch than any English man in the country, and that his conversation was very acceptable to them". This request was granted and Willett resigned his official duties with Plymouth.

When the colony was reorganized with the name of New York, Willett was appointed the first mayor of the town (June 1665) with the approval of the English and Dutch alike; he had apparently maintained a residence in New Amsterdam for some years in addition to his long-established trading relationships. The next year he was elected alderman, and became mayor again for another year in mid-1667. He was a member of the New York governor's executive council at times from 1665 to 1672 under Francis Lovelace.

=== Return to Plymouth and legacy ===
One of the greatest services Willett provided to the colony for many years, along with his father-in-law John Browne, was maintenance of good relations with the Pokanokets whose main village was near Rehoboth, close to Mt. Hope. The relations with the colony soured with Willett's absences to New York and for his other merchant activities, and even more so after his death. The military affairs of the colony were increasingly assumed by Josiah Winslow, who pursued a much more aggressive approach. Alexander, Massasoit's eldest son who had become the leader of the Pokanokets, died while in the custody of Winslow in 1662. Philip, the next eldest son, then became the Pokanoket's leader; relations eventually deteriorated to the point of open warfare between the English colonies and most of the New England tribes in 1675. This became known as King Philip's War.

After his first term as New York mayor, Willett apparently spent time in Rehoboth in early 1667 where he was appointed Captain of the town's militia and was the principal in the establishment of the Township of Swansea. Swansea was originally part of Rehoboth; they divided after a Baptist congregation originally led by Obadiah Holmes, and subsequently by John Myles, arose and had differences with the existing congregation of the town. Among other things, the members of the Baptist congregation were heavily fined for setting up their own congregation and not attending services at the established church. After Swansea was officially recognized, a small group led by Willett was given control over who was allowed to set up residence in the new town. Although Willett's brother-in-law, James Browne, was probably the most prominent lay member of the Baptist congregation, and Willett was deeply involved in establishing it as a separate and recognized congregation, Willett actually may not have been a member of the congregation. Such limited religious tolerance evidently was not extended to Quakers; Willett reportedly was among a group of magistrates condoning a severe whipping of two Quakers in 1658.

After having lost his first wife, Willett married Joanna Boyse in September 1671.

Willett was a given a "halbert" (halberd) in December 1673 when an expedition against the Dutch in New Orange was contemplated. The Dutch had briefly conquered New York and changed the name to New Orange (the name reverted to New York after the Dutch signed a peace treaty in February 1674). This is the last record of Willett's activity in the colony.

Willett left a large estate as evidenced by the inventory compiled for probate. When the Dutch recaptured New York in 1673, Willet's holdings along with those of the other English landowners there were confiscated; he died shortly thereafter and these holdings were never restored. Even with these losses, Willett died one of the wealthiest men in the colony as can be seen from the lengthy inventory. Although no record appears to exist indicating that Willett participated in the slave trade, the inventory of his estate indicates ownership of eight negro slaves when he died. The Plymouth court later decided to grant freedom after two years additional service to one of Willett's slaves who had been taken prisoner during King Philip's war and later returned to Willett's heirs. Willett's will left the bulk of his estate to be divided among his sons (including Samuel Hooker, married to his daughter, Mary), along with more minor bequests to his unmarried daughters, grandchildren, an old servant, schools, churches, and the pastor, John Myles. Willett's will was made in April 1671, prior to his second marriage.

== Family ==
=== Ancestry and transport ===
Coat of Arms of Thomas Willett

The origins of Thomas Willett are not known for certain and are subject to some debate. The most commonly encountered description of his early life from the Dictionary of National Biography describes him as the fourth son of the English clergyman Andrew Willet. The germ of this description may have come from the pedigree of Willett's descendants published in 1848, which offered the theory that this Thomas may have descended from Andrew Willet because the Willett name is rare. A differing opinion exists in Dexter's compilation of the Leyden congregation in the appendix of his work, England and Holland of the Pilgrims. This indicates that Willett was the son of Thomas and Alice Willet of the Leyden congregation. The respective merits of these opinions are discussed by Burgess.

There is general agreement that Willett came over to the Plymouth Colony with the second wave of the Leyden congregation in 1629. There is disagreement however over whether or not he went back to England shortly thereafter for the trial of Edward Ashley who was accused of trading weapons and ammunition to Native Americans. The evidence that this might have been the case is based upon a listing of passengers on the ship Lyon which sailed from London on June 22, 1632, with William Pierce as Master as given by Charles Edward Banks in his Planters of the Commonwealth. This list includes Thomas Willett along with the family of his future father-in-law, John Browne, including Willett's future wife, Mary. However, an examination of the original source material by Samuel Gardner Drake, published in 1860, indicates that the original record for the ship sailing to England on that date listed only a few names of the passengers, including only a "Tobie" Willet and a "Jo:" Browne (but no other Brownes). This and the indication that only the depositions of Willett and others accompanied Ashley back to England for his trial are contrary to Banks' passenger list.

=== Family in the Plymouth Colony and descendants ===
Willett's parents and siblings were evidently left behind when he emigrated to Plymouth in 1629. His family life thereafter centered around that of his wife's family. Willett married Mary, daughter of John Browne (Sr.), a leading citizen of the Plymouth Colony, and Browne's wife, Dorothy, in 1636. He moved with the Brown(e) family from Plymouth westward, originally to the Taunton area by the 1650s, and later to the eastern shores of Narragansett Bay to Wannamoisett, near present-day Barrington, Rhode Island. Willett had substantial business dealings with Browne (Sr.) and later increasingly, especially between 1656 and 1660 when Browne (Sr.) is believed to have been in England, with Browne's two sons, John (Jr.) and James. Another family connection was with Willett's early co-worker in the fur trade, John Howland. Howland's daughter, Lydia, married James Browne and Howland's widow, Elizabeth, was living with James and Lydia Broowne's family when she died. Both John Browne (Sr.) and John Browne (Jr.) died in 1662, the son ten days before the father.

The children of Thomas and Mary Willet, as compiled from several sources, were:

- Mary, b. November 10, 1637, d. June 24, 1712, married Rev. Samuel Hooker (son of Rev. Thomas Hooker) in 1658, remarried Rev. Thomas Buckingham in 1703.
- Martha, b. August 6, 1639, d. 1678, married John Saffin in 1658.
- John, b. August 21, 1641, d. February 2, 1663/4, married Abigail Collins in 1663.
- Sarah, b. May 4, 1643, d. June 13, 1665, married Rev. John Eliot (son of Rev. John Eliot).
- Rebecca, b. December 2, 1644, d. April 2, 1652.
- Thomas, b. October 1, 1646, d. before 1671(?).
- Hester, b. July 6, 1648, d. July 26, 1737, married Rev. Josiah Flint.
- James, b. November 24, 1649, married Elizabeth Hunt (daughter of Peter Hunt) in 1673, remarried Grace Frinck in 1677.
- Hezekiah, b. June 20, 1651, d. July 26, 1651.
- Hezekiah, b. November 16, 1653, d. July 1, 1676, married Ann (or Hannah) Browne (daughter of John Brown (Jr.)) in 1675.
- David, b. November 1, 1654, d. before 1671(?).
- Andrew, b. October 5, 1656, d. April 6, 1712, married Ann Coddington in 1682 (daughter of William and Ann Coddington).
- Samuel, b. October 27, 1658.

(?) Sons John, Thomas, and David are not mentioned in Willett's will which calls James the "eldest son".

There is disagreement over Thomas Willett's date and place of birth. The Dictionary of National Biography states that he was born in England in 1605. Willett's will, dated April 26, 1671, says he was then "being going in the sixty-fourth year of my age" (i.e., he was 63 years old, born between April 27, 1607, and April 27, 1608, prior to the migration to the Netherlands later in 1608 which included those who later became the Leyden congregation). His original gravestone also stated that he died "in the 64th year of his age" in 1674 (i.e., he was born in 1610 or 1611) and this is in agreement with the range given in Dexter's listing for the Willet family in Holland. The respective merits of these opinions are discussed by Burgess. Willet died August 4, 1674, and was buried in the Little Neck Cemetery at Bullock's Cove, Riverside area of East Providence, Rhode Island.

Mary Willett, the first wife of Thomas, died on January 8, 1669, at about 55 years old making her birthdate about 1614, almost certainly in England. Her grave is next to that of Thomas Willett. Little mention is found of her in the records; what is there includes her marriage to Thomas on July 6, 1636, and she is also mentioned in connection with her father's will which was hastily written while he was ill in the short period between his son's death and his own. The will of John Browne (Sr.) made scant reference to his daughter, Mary, no significant bequest to her, and none at all to her offspring. Browne's objective may have been to leave his property to the relatively more needy members of his family rather than to those of Mary's branch, as she was married to one of the wealthiest men in the colony. However this might have been, Browne's intent could have been better expressed and the result was an unusual mention in the colony's records regarding Mary Willett's good relationship with her father.

Joanna Prudden, widow of Rev. Peter Prudden and second wife of Thomas Willett, married Willett in Milford, Connecticut, on September 20, 1671. After Willett's death in 1674, she soon returned to Milford and remarried again, this time to Rev. John Bishop. She was born in Halifax, Yorkshire, England, in 1616 and died on November 8, 1681, in Stamford, Connecticut.

Mary Willett, eldest daughter of Capt. Thomas Willett and his wife Mary, married in 1658 Rev. Samuel Hooker, son of Rev. Thomas Hooker, Puritan divine and founder of Hartford, Connecticut.

There is some thought that Willett's son, Thomas Willett (Jr.), was the major in the militia of Queens County who was a councilor under Governors Sir Edmund Andros and Henry Sloughter. According to Hillman it is probable that this Major Thomas Willett was actually a member of another Willett family which had settled on Long Island. They were possibly cousins of the Thomas Willett who is the subject of this article.

Hezekiah Willett was killed during King Philip's War in spite of the special consideration which was supposed to be extended to the Browne/Willett family by Philip's followers. This was a source of great sorrow to Philip as reported by the servant captured when Hezekiah was killed (this probably was the slave later ordered freed by the colony's court). This incident also exasperated the Plymouth colonists; special punishments were eventually meted out to Hezekiah's killers.

Andrew Willett spent most of his adult life near what is now Kingston, Rhode Island. He married Ann Coddington, daughter of William Coddington, a governor of Rhode Island. Thomas Willett's interests in the Atherton Company led to ownership of land in this area of Rhode Island, then known as the "Boston Neck", along with other company shareholders who over time banded together as merchants, which included Thomas Willett's son, Andrew. Some confusion exists in the records distinguishing between the Boston Neck area of Rhode Island and Boston, Massachusetts.

Some have claimed that one of Willett's great-grandsons was Marinus Willett, who also served as Mayor of New York from 1807 to 1808, assuming that Willett's son, Samuel, settled on Long Island where he became Sheriff of Queens County and Marinus' grandfather. This claim has been refuted by E. Haviland Hillman in an article published in The New York Genealogical and Biographical Record, Volume 47 at 119, published in April 1916.

The descendants of Thomas Willett were numerous. The 'Dorothy Q.' of the poem of Oliver Wendell Holmes was Thomas Willett's great-granddaughter, and the great-grandmother of Holmes. Another of Thomas Willett's descendants is American musician Parthenon Willett Miller Huxley.

The Fire Department of New York operated a fireboat named Thomas Willett from 1908 to 1959.

== Notes ==
New title	Mayor of New York City; 1665–1666	Succeeded by Thomas Delavall
Preceded by Thomas Delavall	Mayor of New York City; 1667–1668	Succeeded by Cornelius Van Steenwyk
