= William Nicoll (politician, born 1657) =

Merchant and politician

Speaker of the New York General Assembly
- In office October 20, 1702 – May 27, 1718
- Preceded by: Abraham Gouverneur
- Succeeded by: Robert Livingston

Personal details
- Born: 1657; Islip, Northamptonshire, England
- Died: November 20, 1723 (aged 65–66); Province of New York, British America
- Spouse: Anna Van Rensselaer
- Children: William Nicoll Jr. Benjamin Nicoll
- Parent(s): Matthias Nicoll; Abigail Johns Nicoll

William Nicoll (1657 – November 20, 1723) was an English-born colonial American merchant and politician who served as the Speaker of the New York General Assembly.

== Early life ==
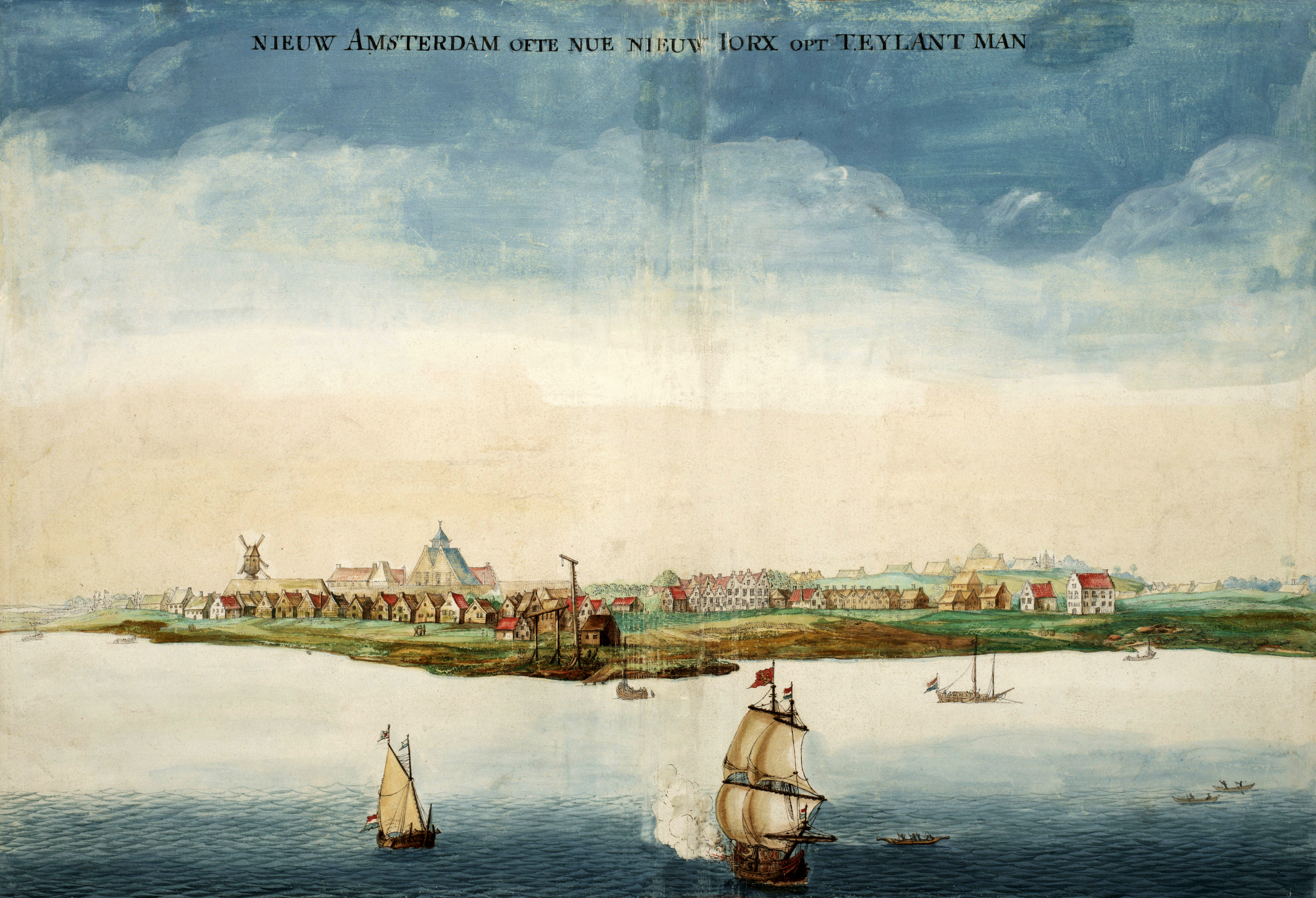
1664 painting of New Amsterdam, by Johannes Vingboons, painted in the year Nicolls came to America.

Nicoll was born in the village of Islip, Northamptonshire, in 1657. He was the son of Abigail (née Johns) Nicoll and Matthias Nicoll, who served as the 6th Mayor of New York City from 1672 to 1673. His sister, Margaret Nicoll, was married to Col. Richard Floyd Jr., the colonel of provincial troops of Suffolk County and judge of the Court of Common Pleas and grandfather of William Floyd.

Nicoll came to America in 1664 with his father and Richard Nicolls, the 1st Colonial governor of the Province of New York. His father, Richard's secretary and reportedly also his nephew, was present for the Peter Stuyvesant's surrender of Dutch New Amsterdam to the English.

William was educated by his father and studied law with him. When Edmund Andros returned to England in 1681 to receive a knighthood, William went with him, served in the English Army and saw active service in Flanders.

== Career ==
After returning to America, Nicoll was admitted to the bar and was appointed Clerk of Queens County and in 1683, he became Register of the Court of Admiralty.

On April 11, 1687, he was appointed Attorney General of the Province of New York. He held this office for only a year due to James II annexation of New York to the Dominion of New England on May 7, 1688. Nicoll was vehemently opposed the Leisler Rebellion (May 1689 to March 1691) and refused to surrender his commission as Justice of the Peace, therefore, Jacob Leisler imprisoned him. Nicoll was jailed for 14 months until March 1691 when Governor Henry Sloughter arrived from New York and squashed the rebellion. Upon his release from prison, Nicoll was appointed to the Governor's Council and named King's Counsel during Leisler's Treason Trial.

In 1695, the Assembly sent Nicoll and Chidley Brooke, a fellow Council member, to London to urge the English government to require the other English colonies to help pay for a force to defend against the French. While traveling, Nicoll and Brooke were captured by French privateers, robbed, and he was again imprisoned, this time in St. Malo.

He was eventually released and in 1701, he was elected as a member of the New York General Assembly, representing Suffolk County, serving until his death in 1723. From October 20, 1702, until May 27, 1718, when he resigned due to ill health, he also served as the Speaker of the Assembly.

== Personal life ==
On November 29, 1683, Governor Thomas Dongan granted Nicoll a royal patent of 50,000 acres on the Long Island. In later years, received further land grants and his manor became the largest on Long Island totaling 100 square miles (260 km^{2}). In 1701, he built a mansion on the Great South Bay in present-day Islip, New York in honor of his birthplace in England. In 1718, Nicoll sold his father's estate, Plandome Manor, then over 1,000 acres. The manor house on his father's estate was torn down in 1998 by its new owner.

Nicoll was married to Anna van Rensselaer (1665-1723). She was the widow of the patroon Kiliaen van Rensselaer, and the daughter of Jeremias van Rensselaer and Maria (née Van Cortlandt) Van Rensselaer. Among her large family were uncles Stephanus Van Cortlandt and Jacobus Van Cortlandt, both of whom served as mayor of New York City. Together, William and Anna were the parents of:

- Mary Nicoll (b. 1689), who married Scottish immigrant Robert Watts (1678–1750).
- Benjamin Nicoll (1694–1724), who married his cousin, Charity Floyd (1692–1758). After his death, she married Samuel Johnson and became the mother of William Samuel Johnson.
- Catherine Nicoll (1700–1779), who married Jonathan Havens.
- William Nicoll Jr. (1702–1768), who was elected to the General Assembly in 1739 (until 1769), and served as its Speaker from January 31, 1759, until February 6, 1768.
- Frances Nicoll (1704–1787), who married Edward Holland, the 40th mayor of New York City.

Nicoll died at his home, the manor of Islip Grange, on November 20, 1723.

=== Descendants ===
As William Nicoll Jr. died unmarried and without issue, the Nicoll estate was inherited by William's grandson, William Nicoll III (d. 1778), the eldest son of Benjamin, who became the third family member to be elected to the General Assembly where he served from 1768 until 1769.

Through his daughter Mary, he was the grandfather of John Watts, himself the father of U.S. Representative John Watts. Through his daughter Catherine, he was the grandfather of Nicoll Havens (1733–1783), who married Sarah Fosdick (1730–1767), parents of Yale graduate and U.S. Representative Jonathan Nicoll Havens.
