= George Edwin Bissell =

American sculptor (1839–1920)

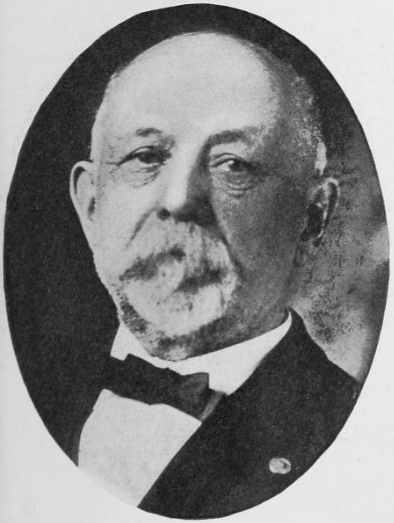
- Born: February 16, 1839; New Preston, Connecticut, U.S.
- Died: August 30, 1920 (aged 81); Mount Vernon, New York, U.S.
- Known for: Sculpture

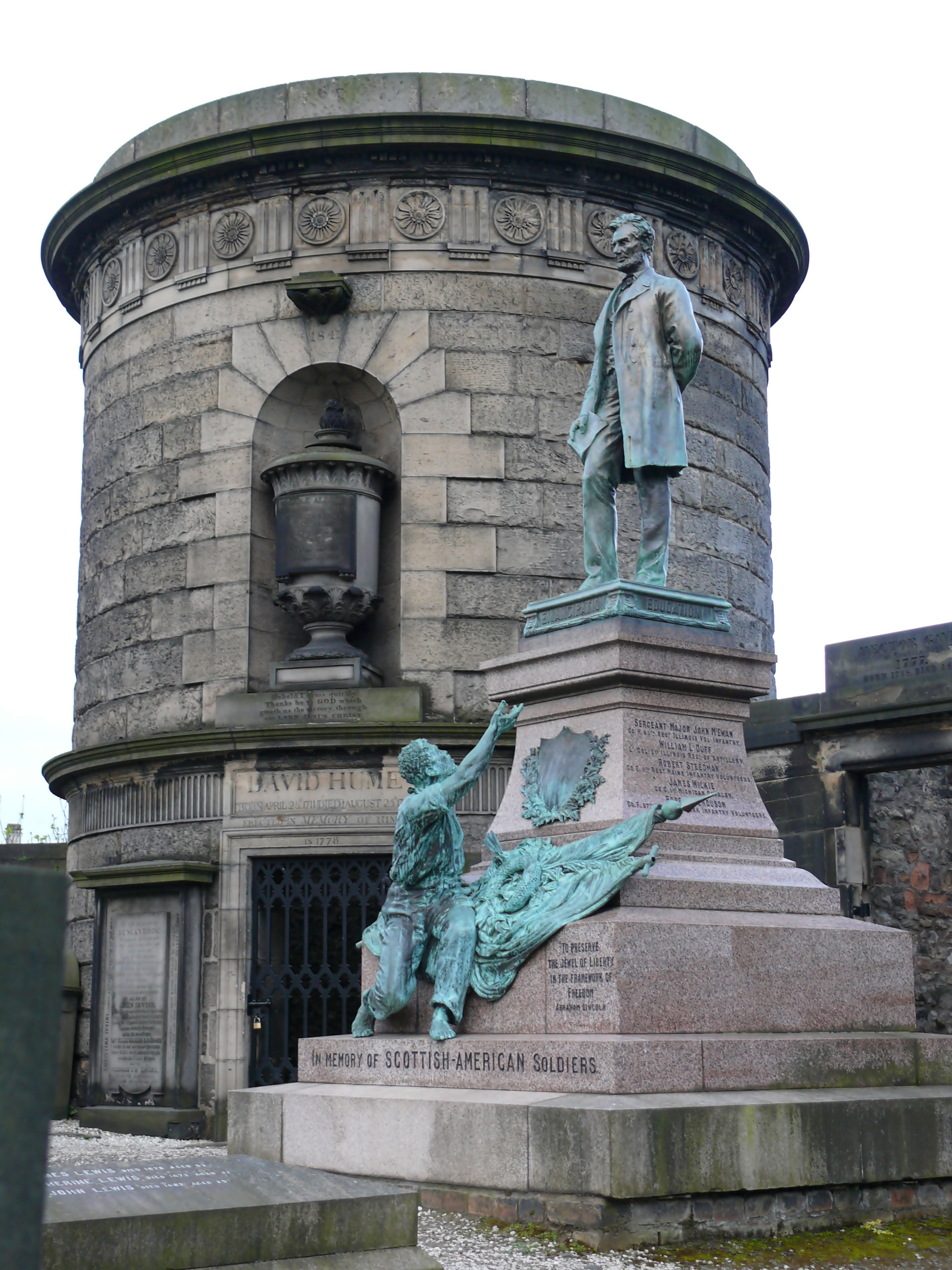
Lincoln Memorial (1893), Old Calton Burying Ground, Edinburgh, Scotland

George Edwin Bissell (February 16, 1839 – August 30, 1920) was an American sculptor.

== Biography ==
Bissell was born in New Preston, Connecticut, the son of a quarryman and marble-cutter. During the American Civil War he served as a private in the 23rd Connecticut Volunteers in the Department of the Gulf (1862–1863), and on being mustered out, became acting assistant paymaster in the South Atlantic Squadron. At the close of the war he joined his father's marble business in Poughkeepsie, New York.

He studied the art of sculpture abroad in 1875–1876, and lived much in Paris during the years 1883–1896, with occasional visits to America. Bissell also created smaller works, such as a bust of President Abraham Lincoln as well as a larger statue of the president.

Bissell died in Mount Vernon, New York on August 30, 1920.

== Selected works ==
- Frederic de Peyster, New York Historical Society, New York City, ca. 1875.
- Chatfield Monument, Riverside Cemetery, Waterbury, Connecticut, ca. 1880.
- General Horatio Gates, Saratoga Battle Monument, Saratoga, New York, 1885–86.
- Sam Sloan, Lackawanna Ferry Terminal, Hoboken, New Jersey, 1889.
- Statue of John Watts, depicting the New York politician of the same name, Trinity Church Cemetery, 1890.
- Bas-relief panel of Robert Burns and Highland Mary, on pedestal of George Anderson Lawson's Statue of Robert Burns, Ayr, Scotland, 1891.
- Colonel Abraham de Peyster, New York Historical Society, 1896. This statue stood in Bowling Green Park from 1896 to 1972, and in Hanover Square from 1976 to 2004.
- Statue of Chester A. Arthur, Madison Square, New York City, 1898–99.
- Abraham Lincoln, Lightner Museum, St. Augustine, Florida, 1899.
- Chancellor James Kent, Library of Congress, Washington, D.C., ca. 1899.

=== Civil War monuments ===
- Union Soldier, Civil War Monument, Town Green, Colchester, Connecticut, 1875.
- Soldiers' Monument, The Green, Waterbury, Connecticut, 1882–85.
- Soldiers' Monument, Soldiers' Monument Park, Winsted, Connecticut, 1887–90.
- Columbia, atop Soldiers' Monument, Civil War Memorial Park, Salisbury, Connecticut, 1891.
- Lincoln Memorial (In Memory of Scottish-American Soldiers), Old Calton Burying Ground, Edinburgh, Scotland, 1893.
- Bust of Admiral John A. B. Dahlgren, Smith Memorial Arch, Fairmount Park, Philadelphia, Pennsylvania, 1901–04.
- Abraham Lincoln, Lincoln Park, Clermont, Iowa, 1902. A replica of Bissell's statue in Edinburgh, Scotland.

== Gallery ==
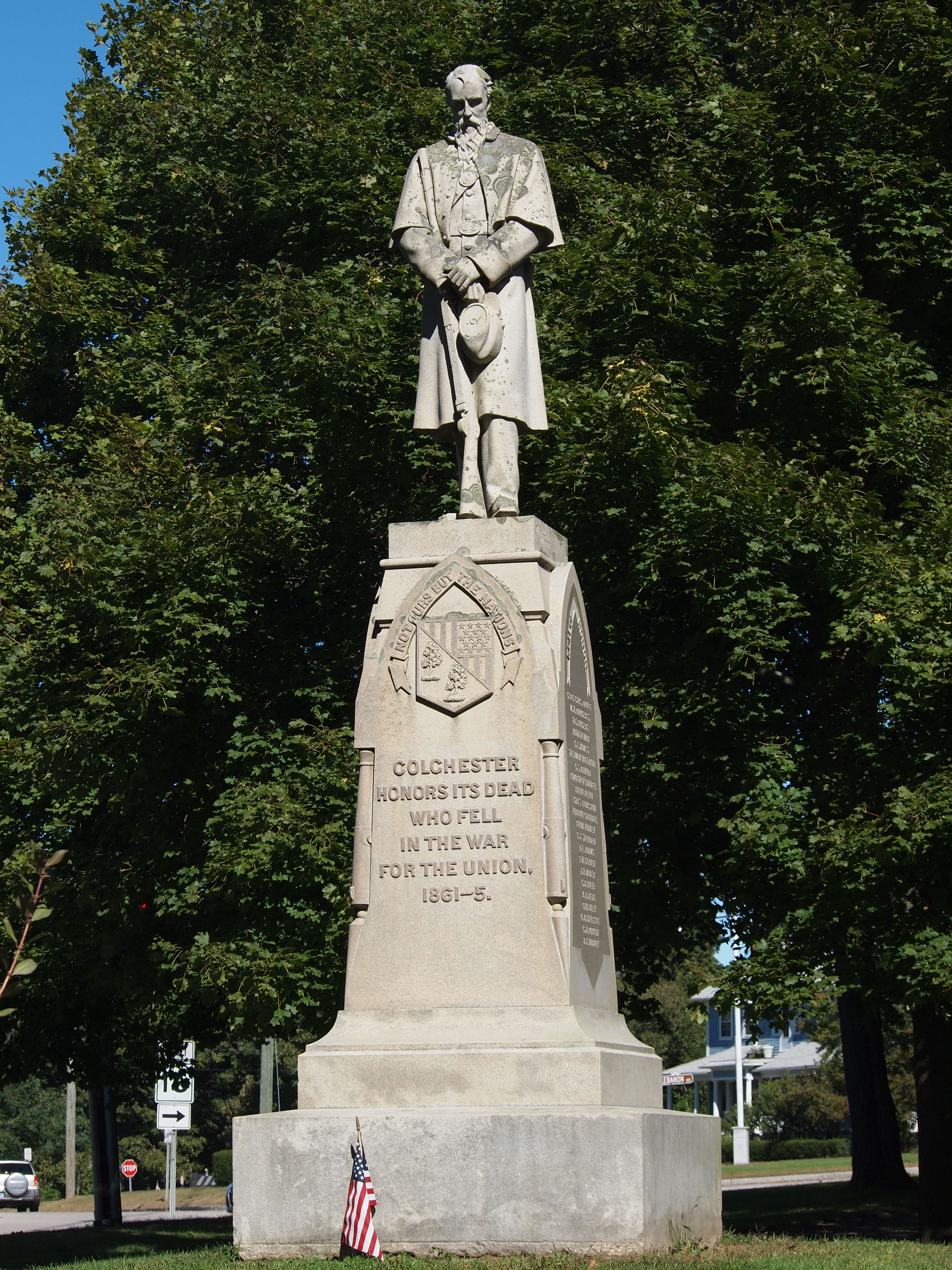
Civil War Monument (1875), Colchester, Connecticut

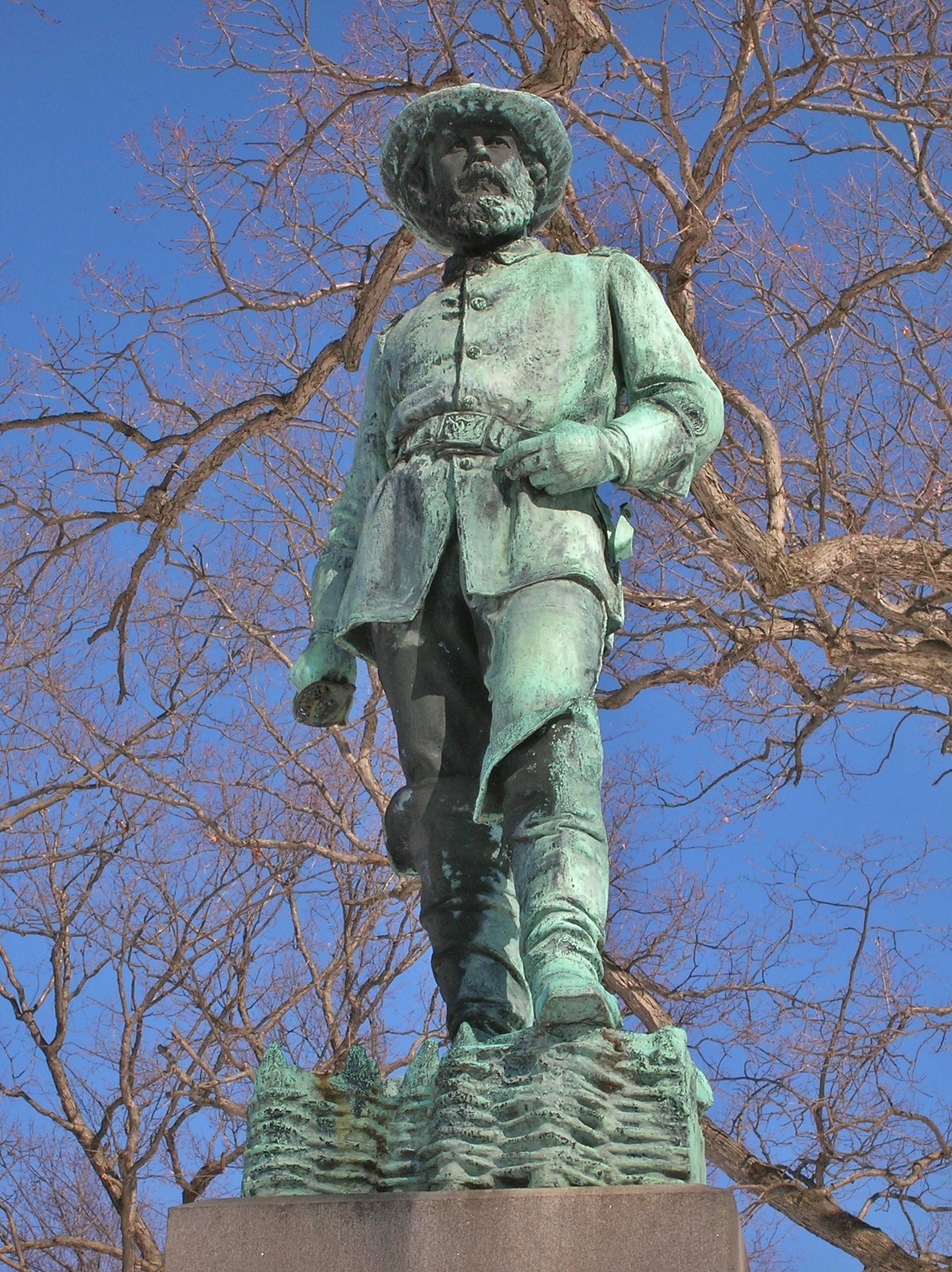
John Lyman Chatfield (unveiled 1887), Riverside Cemetery, Waterbury, Connecticut

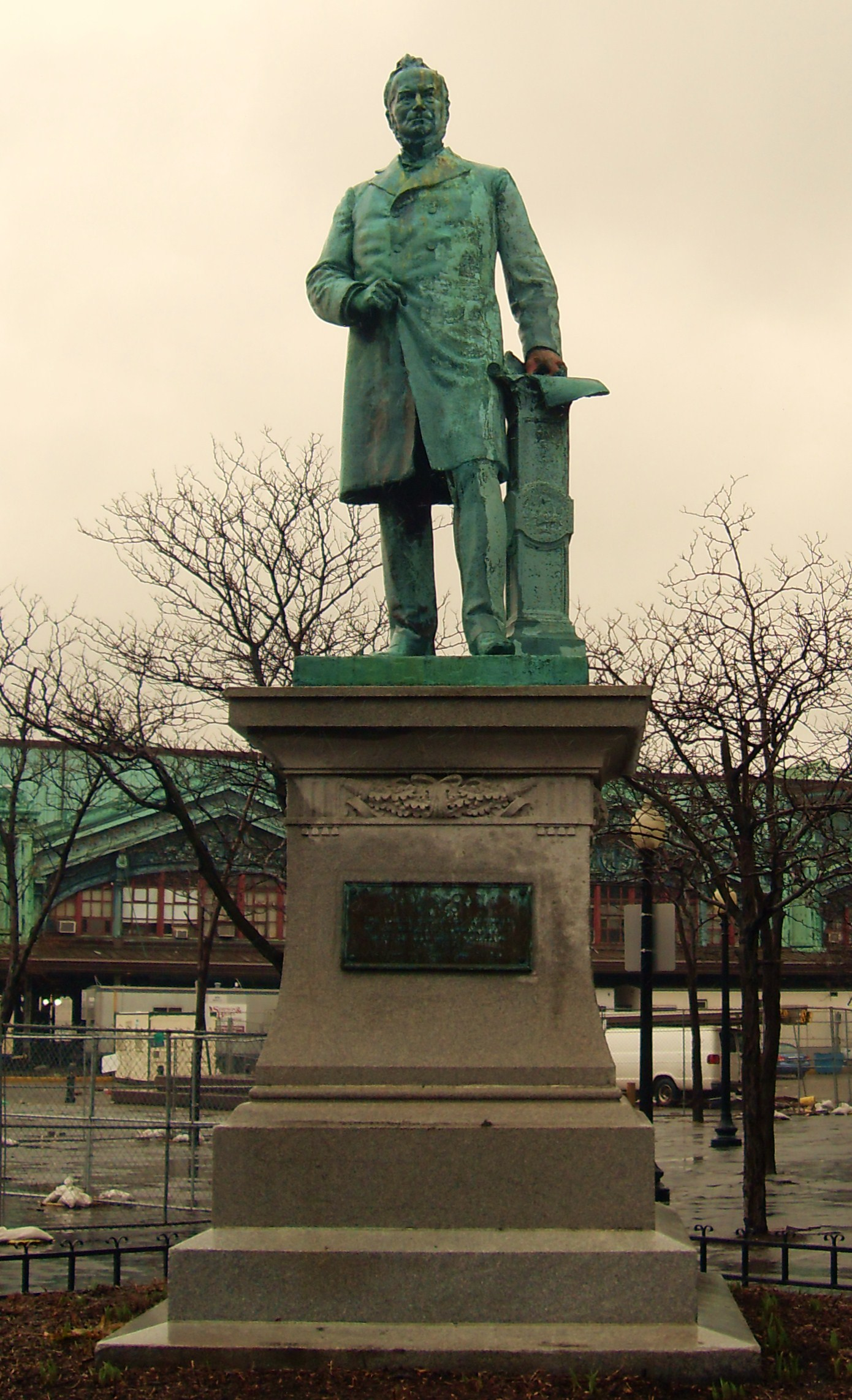
Sam Sloan (1889), Lackawanna Ferry Terminal, Hoboken, New Jersey

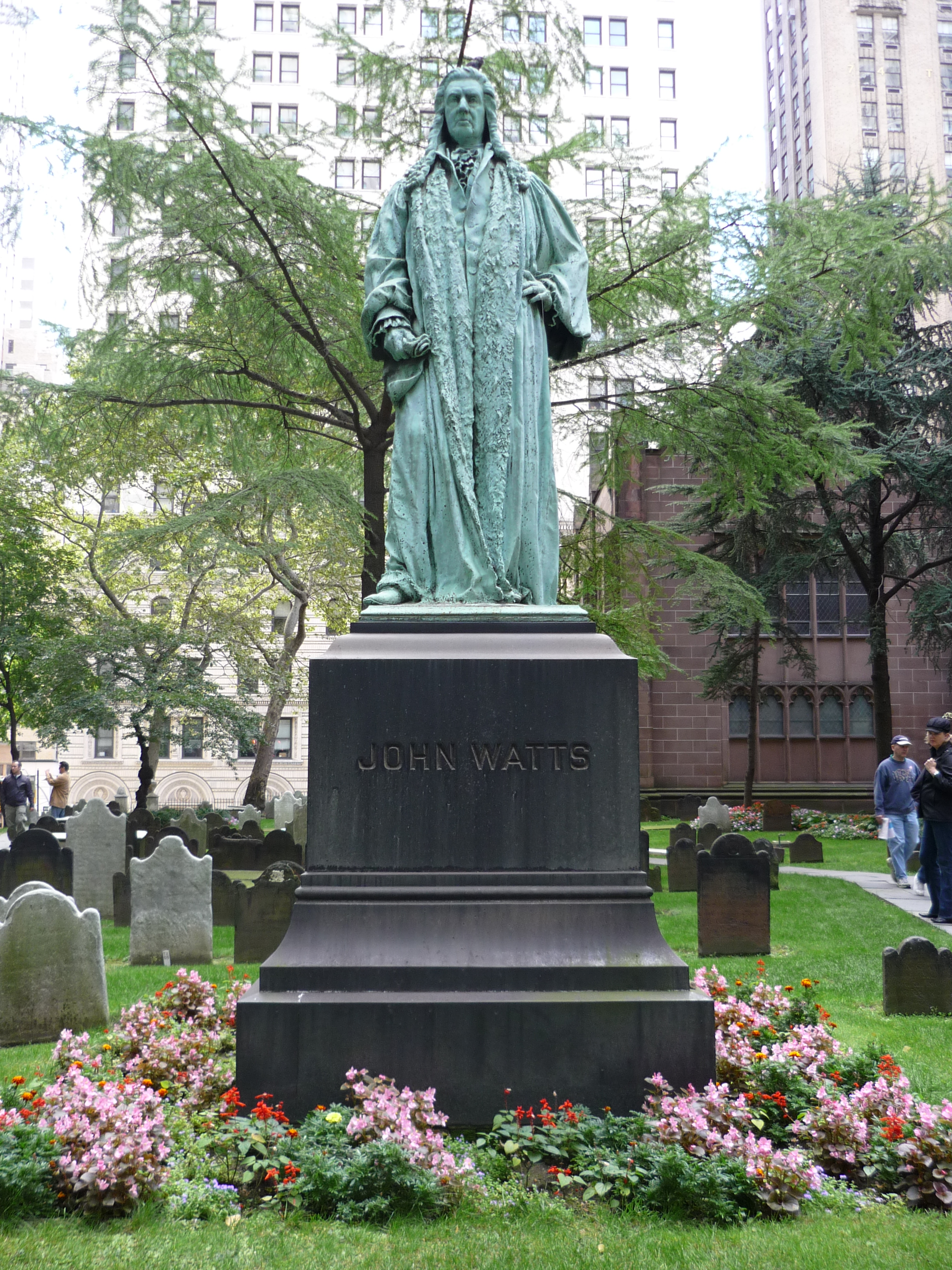
John Watts (1890), Trinity Church (New York City)

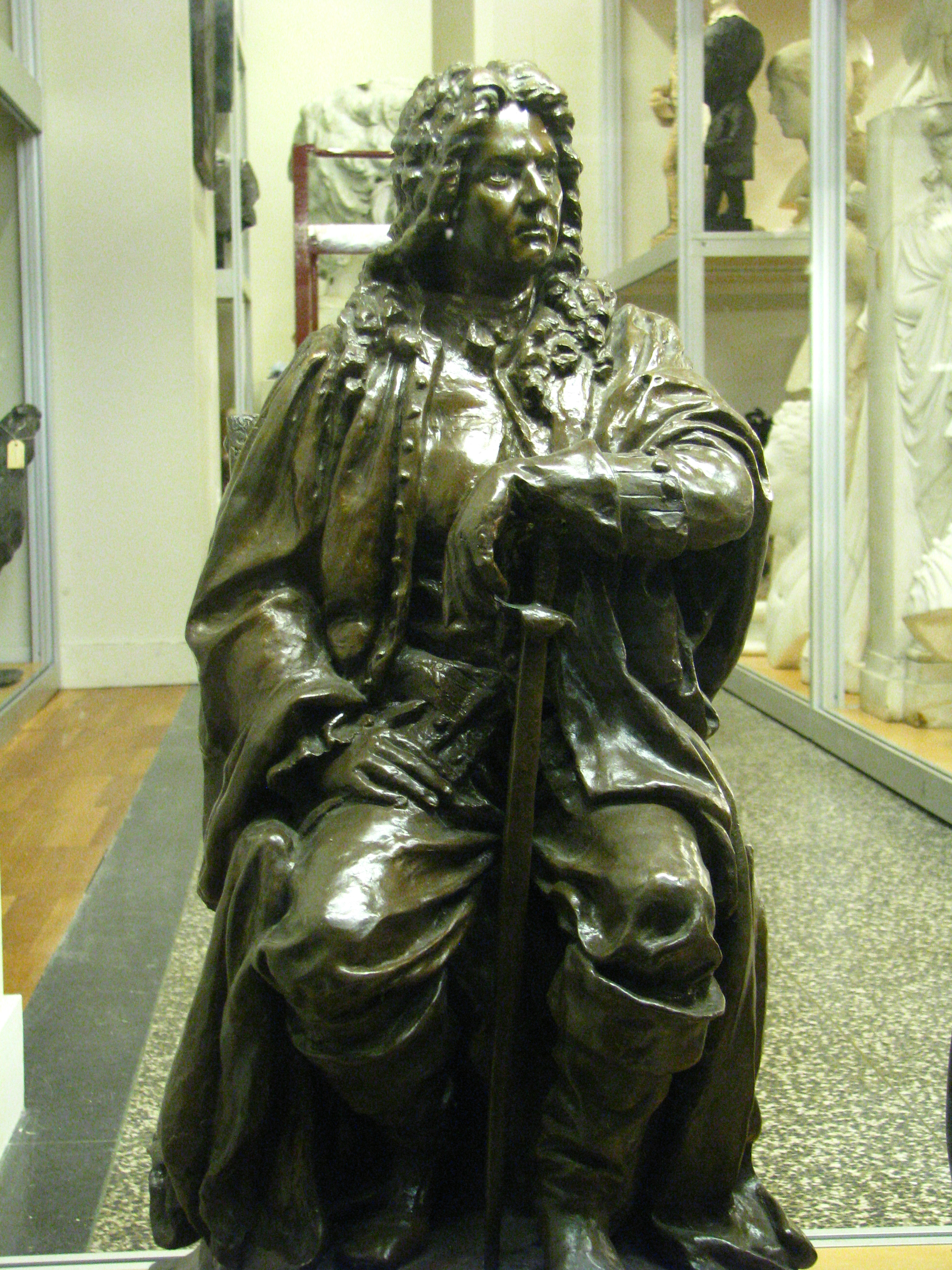
Abraham de Peyster (1896), New York Historical Society, New York City

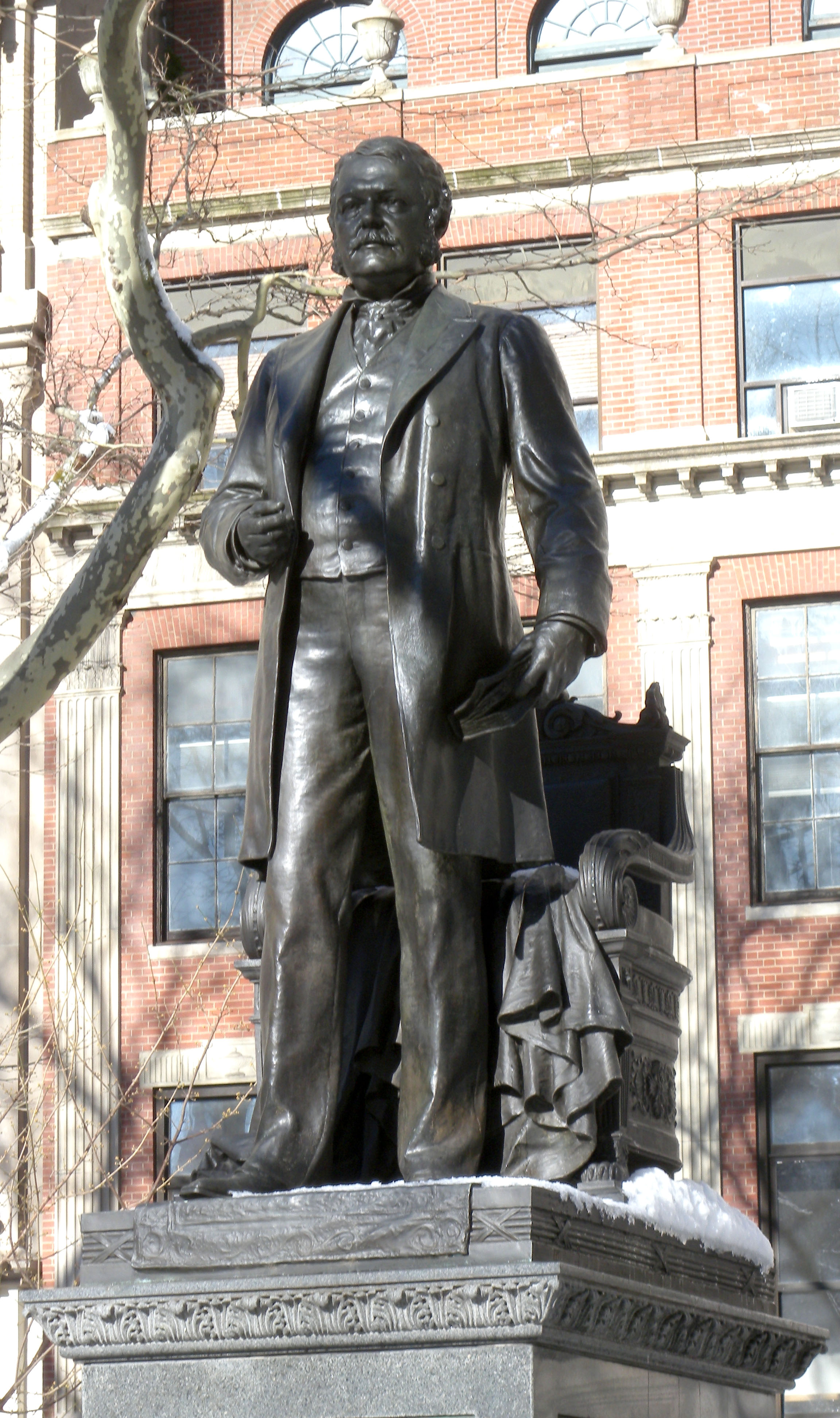
Chester A. Arthur (1898–99), Madison Square, New York City

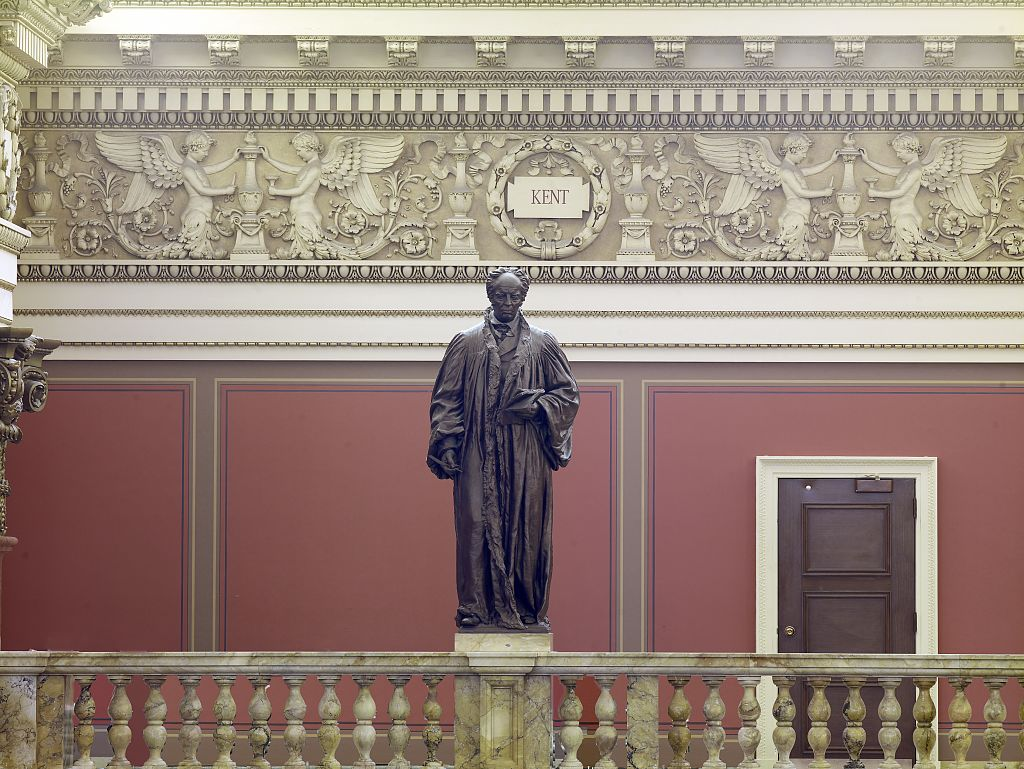
Chancellor James Kent (c. 1899), Library of Congress, Washington, D.C.

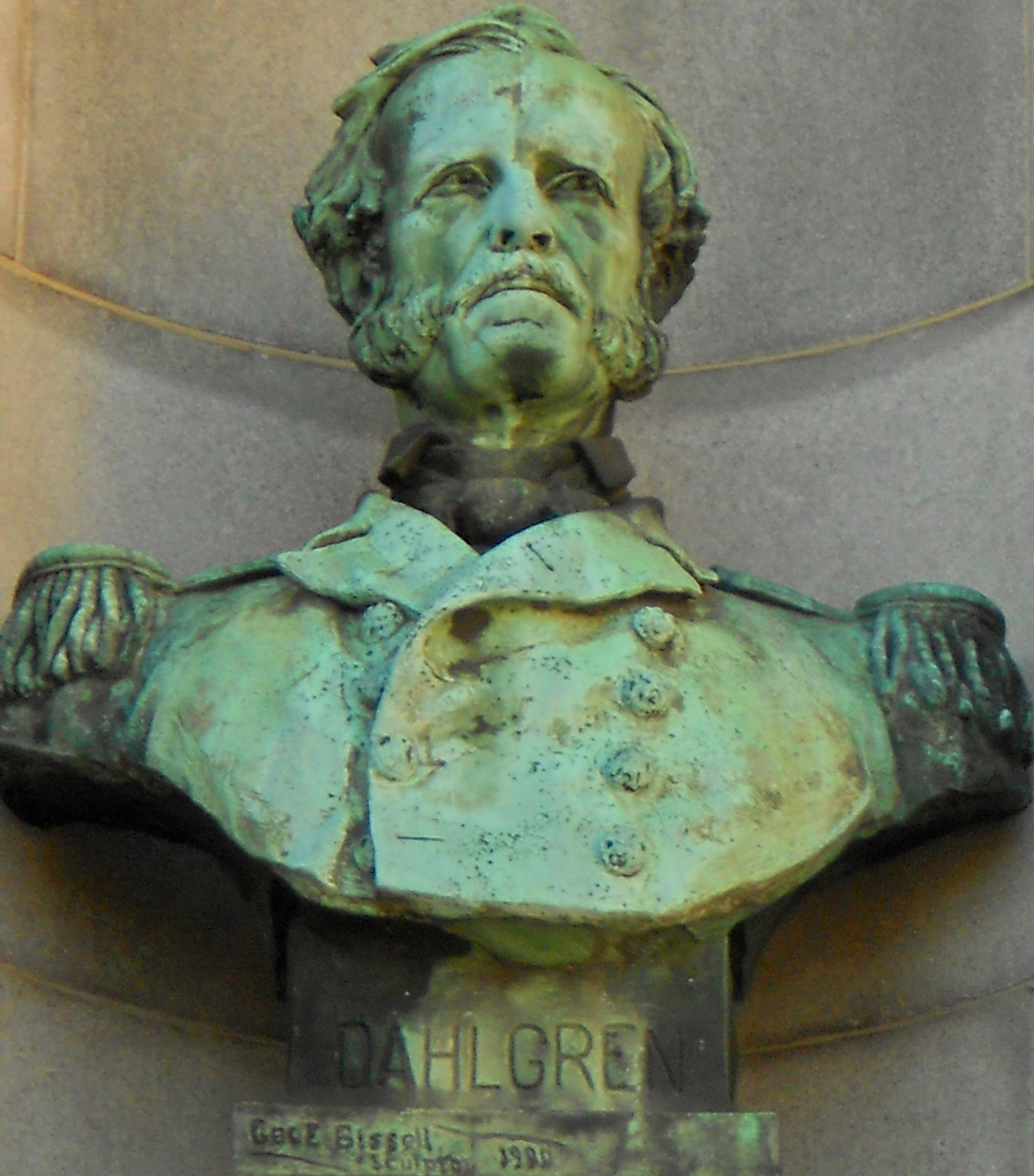
Bust of Admiral John A. B. Dahlgren (1901–04), Smith Memorial Arch, Fairmount Park, Philadelphia, Pennsylvania

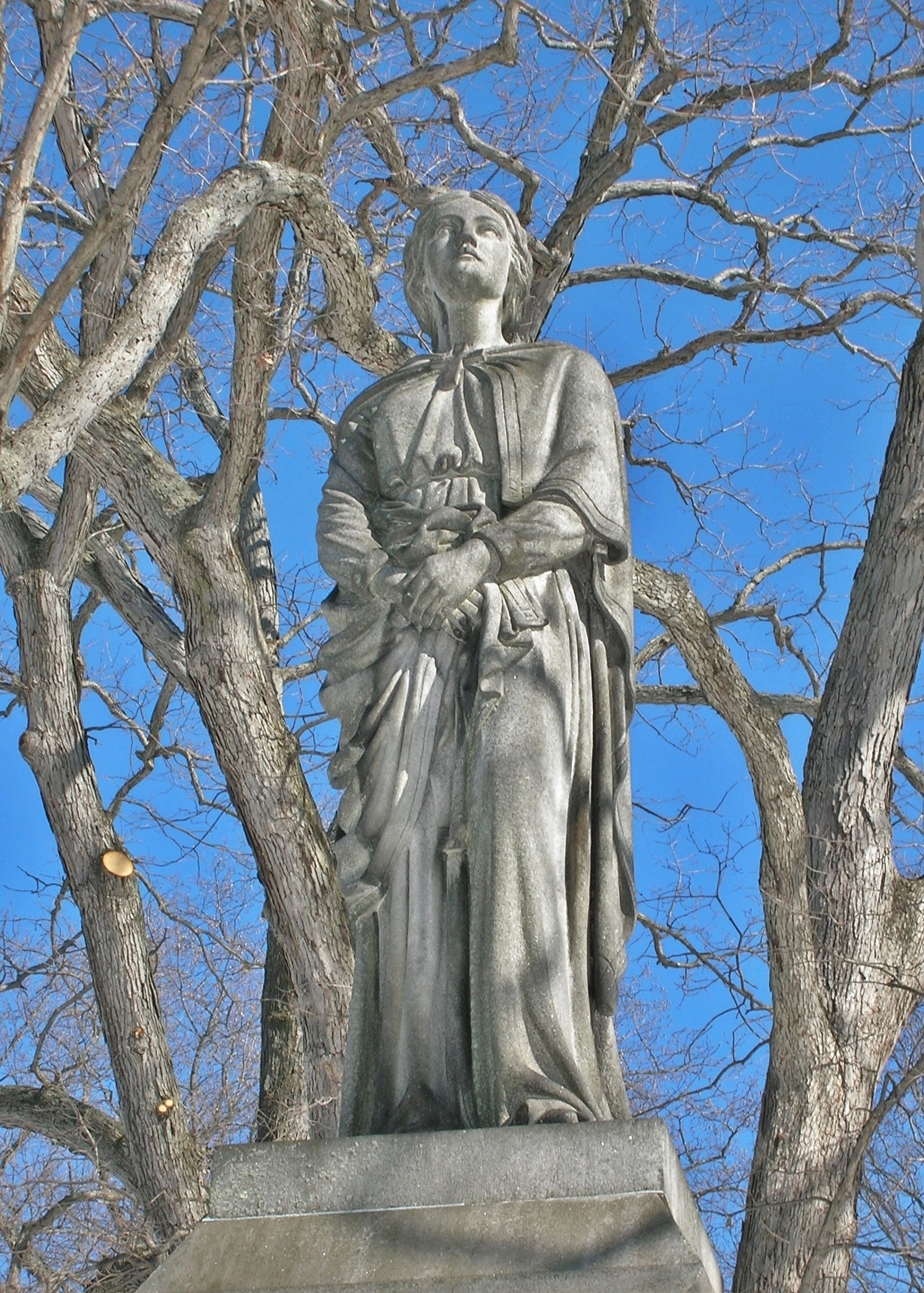
Booth monument, Riverside Cemetery, Waterbury, Connecticut (1878)

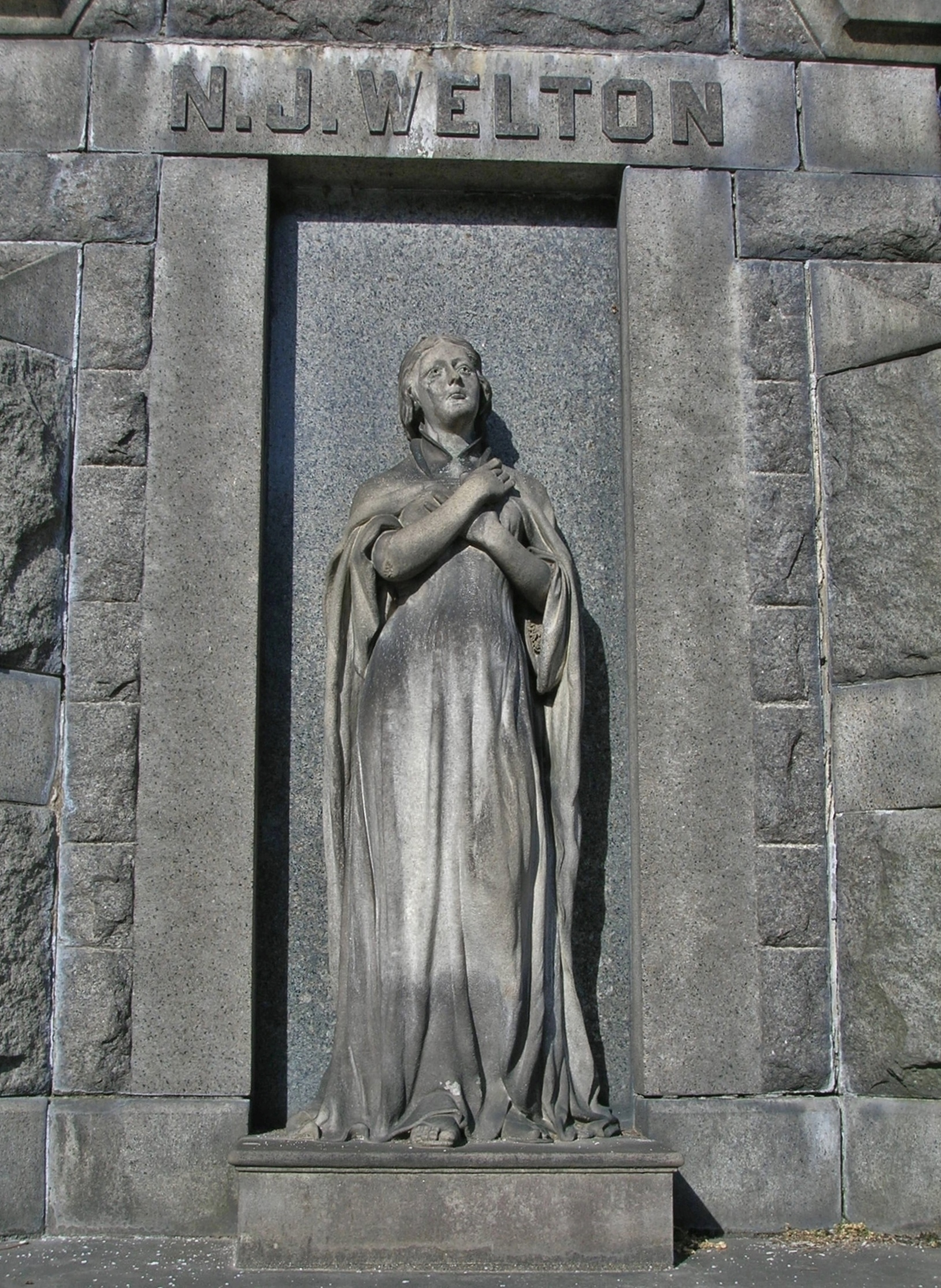
N.J. Welton monument, Riverside Cemetery, Waterbury, Connecticut (1880)
