= William Nicol =

William Nicol may refer to:

- William Nicol (geologist) (1770–1851), Scottish physicist and geologist
- William Nicol (surgeon) (1790–1879), Member of Parliament for Dover, 1859–1865
- William Nicol (Transvaal) (1887–1967), clergyman and Governor of the Transvaal
- William Nicol (teacher) (1744–1797), Scottish schoolmaster and friend of Robert Burns

== See also ==
- William Nicoll (disambiguation)
- William Nichol (disambiguation)
- William Nickle (disambiguation)
