= William Nickle =

William Nickle may refer to:

- William Folger Nickle (1869–1957), Canadian politician, member of the Canadian House of Commons and in the Ontario legislature
- William McAdam Nickle (1897–?), Ontario political figure

== See also ==
- William Nicol (disambiguation)
- William Nichol (disambiguation)
