= Peter Delanoy =

Mayor of New York City from 1689 to 1691

19th Mayor of New York City
- In office 1689–1691
- Preceded by: Stephanus Van Cortlandt
- Succeeded by: John Lawrence

Personal details
- Born: Circa. 1657
- Died: Circa. 1695

Peter Delanoy, who served from 1689 to 1691, was the first and only directly elected Mayor of New York City until 1834. Appointed mayors resumed in the wake of Leisler's Rebellion. He was succeeded by former Mayor John Lawrence.

== The Revolution of 1688-89 ==
In 1688, King James II of England and VII of Scotland was overthrown, and this precipitated a revolution in the colonies known as Leisler's Rebellion. Delanoy, Leisler's friend and ally, was elected Mayor of New York.

On September 29, 1689, by order of the committee of safety, the people had come together in their wards, and for the first time they had elected their aldermen and councilmen, and also for the very first time, they had elected their mayor, and Delanoy was their choice. Also elected were Johannes Johnson as sheriff, and Abraham Gouverneur as clerk.

On October 14, Delanoy was proclaimed mayor by Governor Jacob Leisler, and on the same day he took the oath of office, together with the Common Council, in the city hall at Coenties Slip.
