= Statue of Chester A. Arthur =

Statue in Manhattan, New York, U.S.

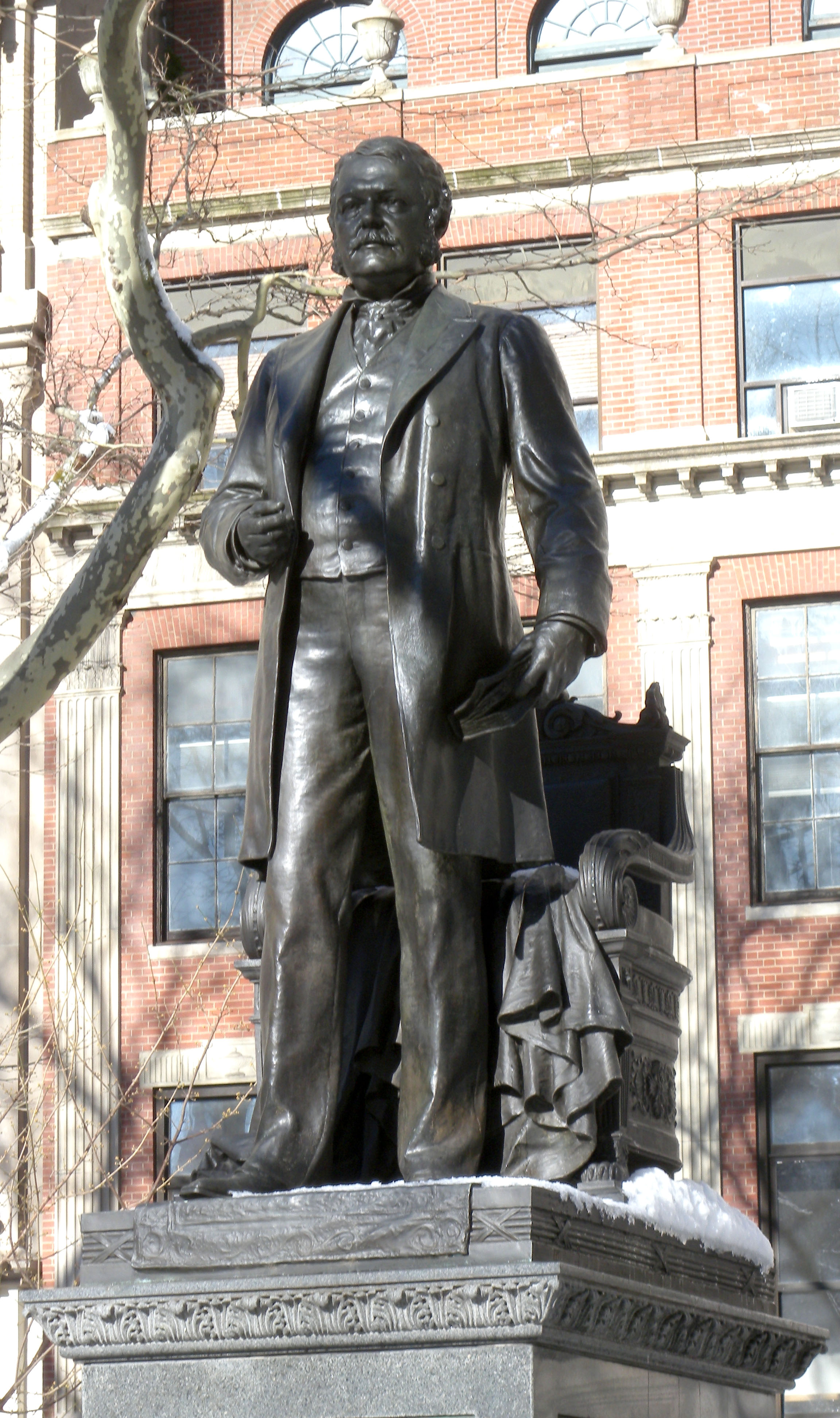
- The statue in 2010
- Artist: George Edwin Bissell
- Medium: Bronze sculpture
- Subject: Chester A. Arthur
- Location: New York City, U.S.; 40.74278°N 73.98694°W

An outdoor bronze sculpture of American president Chester A. Arthur by artist George Edwin Bissell and architect James Brown Lord is installed at Madison Square Park in Manhattan, New York. Cast in 1898 and dedicated on June 13, 1899, the statue rests on a Barre Granite pedestal.

== See also ==
- 1899 in art
- List of sculptures of presidents of the United States
