= Statue of John Watts =

Statue by George Edwin Bissell in Manhattan, New York, USA

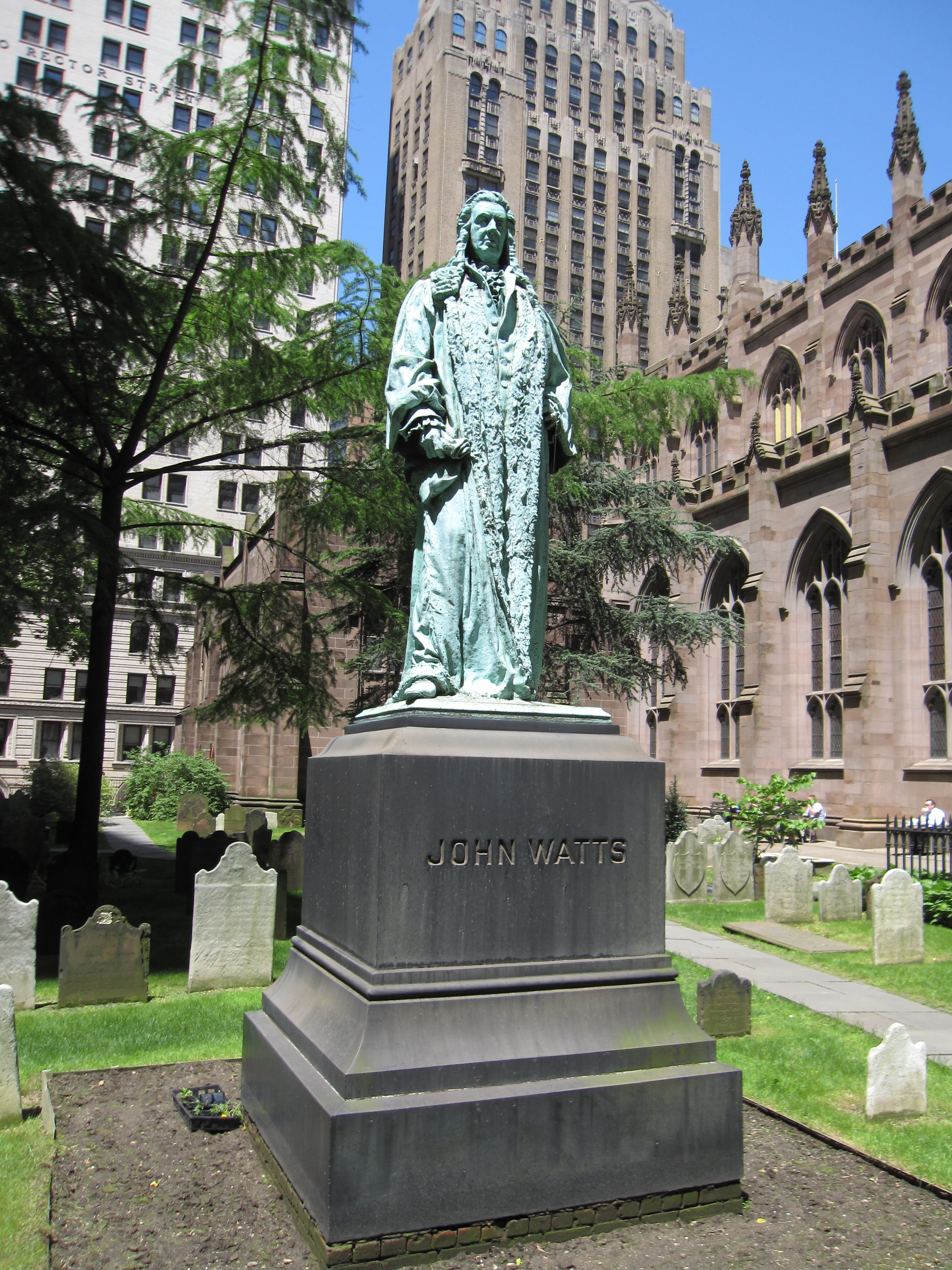
- The statue in 2010
- Artist: George Edwin Bissell
- Subject: John Watts
- Location: New York City, New York, United States; 40.707692°N 74.012144°W

An outdoor bronze sculpture depicting U.S. Congressman John Watts by George Edwin Bissell is installed in the Trinity Church Cemetery outside Manhattan's Trinity Church, in the U.S. state of New York. It was erected by Watt's grandson, John Watts de Peyster, in 1893.

== See also ==
- 1893 in art
