= Stephen Bayard =

40th mayor of New York City from 1744 to 1747

40th Mayor of New York City
- In office September 29, 1744 – 1747
- Preceded by: John Cruger
- Succeeded by: Edward Holland

Personal details
- Born: Stephanus Bayard; May 31, 1700 New York City, New York, US
- Died: 1757 (aged 56–57) Bergen County, NJ, US
- Spouse: Alida Vetch (after 1724)
- Relations: Nicholas Bayard (grandfather); Stephen Van Cortlandt (grandfather); William Bayard Jr. (grandson)
- Children: 8
- Parent(s): Samuel Bayard; Margaretta Van Cortlandt

Stephanus Bayard or Stephen Bayard (May 31, 1700 [baptized] – 1757) was the 40th Mayor of New York City from 1744 to 1747. He was instrumental in the founding of Columbia University.

== Early life ==
Stephanus Bayard was born in May 1700 to Judge Samuel Bayard (1669–1746) and Margaretta Van Cortlandt (1674–1719). His paternal grandfather was Nicholas Bayard (c. 1644–1707), the 16th Mayor of New York City and a nephew of Peter Stuyvesant. His maternal grandparents were Stephen Van Cortlandt (1643–1700), the 17th Mayor of New York City, and Gertruj Schuyler, daughter of Philip Pieterse Schuyler.

His siblings included Judith Bayard, who married Rip Van Dam, Nicholas Bayard (1698–1765), who married Elizabeth Rynders, Gertruyd Bayard, who married Peter Kemble (1704–1789), Samuel Bayard, who married Catharine Van Horn, and Margaretta Bayard (b. 1719) who married James Van Horn.

== Career ==
In 1725, Bayard wrote to Robert Livingston stating that 30 slaves died on a voyage to the colony due to a shortage of food and that Moses Levy was awaiting the payment of Livingston's account.

On September 29, 1744, Bayard was appointed the 40th Mayor of New York City for three consecutive one-year terms until 1747. During his first year in office, he took steps to found a college in New York City, feeling that New Yorkers had neglected the interests of education. He initiated the raising of £2,250 for the foundation of a college, which was completed 10 years later and became King's College and then Columbia University.

In May 1745, his government prohibited skinners, leather dressers, and curriers from neighborhoods below the Collect and prohibited hatters and starch makers from pouring waste into the streets.

=== Hoboken ===
Bayard had country estate and farm(which he was likely buried on) at Castle Point, called Hoboken, in Bergen County, New Jersey. After his death, his son, William Bayard, inherited the property. William, who originally supported the revolutionary cause, became a Loyalist Tory after the fall of New York in 1776 when the city and surrounding areas, including the west bank of the renamed Hudson River, were occupied by the British. At the end of the Revolutionary War, Bayard's property was confiscated by the Revolutionary Government of New Jersey. In 1784, the land described as "William Bayard's farm at Hoebuck" was bought at auction by Colonel John Stevens for £18,360 (then $90,000).

== Personal life ==
Coat of Arms of Stephen Bayard

On March 12, 1724, he married Alida Vetch (b. 1705), the only daughter of Samuel Vetch (1668–1732), the Royal Governor of Nova Scotia, and Margaret Livingston (1681–1758), a daughter of Robert Livingston and Alida Schuyler Van Rensselaer. Together, they were the parents of eight children, including:

- Samuel Bayard
- Nicholas Bayard
- William Bayard (1729–1804), who married Catharine McEvers (1732–1814) in 1750, who was a delegate to the 1765 Stamp Act Congress and loyalist in the Revolutionary War
- Stephen Bayard
- Robert Bayard (1739–1819), who married Rebecca Apthorp (1746–1772), daughter of Charles Apthorp, in 1766. After her death, he married her sister, Elizabeth Apthorp (b. 1740), the widow of James McEvers, in 1773.
- Margaret Bayard

After his first wife's death, he married Eve Schuyler in New Barbadoes, New Jersey. They did not have any children.

=== Descendants ===
His grandchildren included: Samuel Vetch Bayard (1757–1832), William Bayard Jr. (1761–1826), Mary Bayard (1779–1849), and Elise Justine Bayard (1823–c.1852).

His great-granddaughter, Harriet Elizabeth Bayard (1799–1875), married General Stephen Van Rensselaer IV (1789–1868), son of Stephen Van Rensselaer III, both distant cousins through the Van Cortlandt family. His great-grandson, William Bayard Cutting (1850–1912), was a merchant, developer, and factory owner.
