= Cornelius Steenwyk =

Mayor of New York City (1668–71, 1682–84)

Cornelius Van Steenwyk
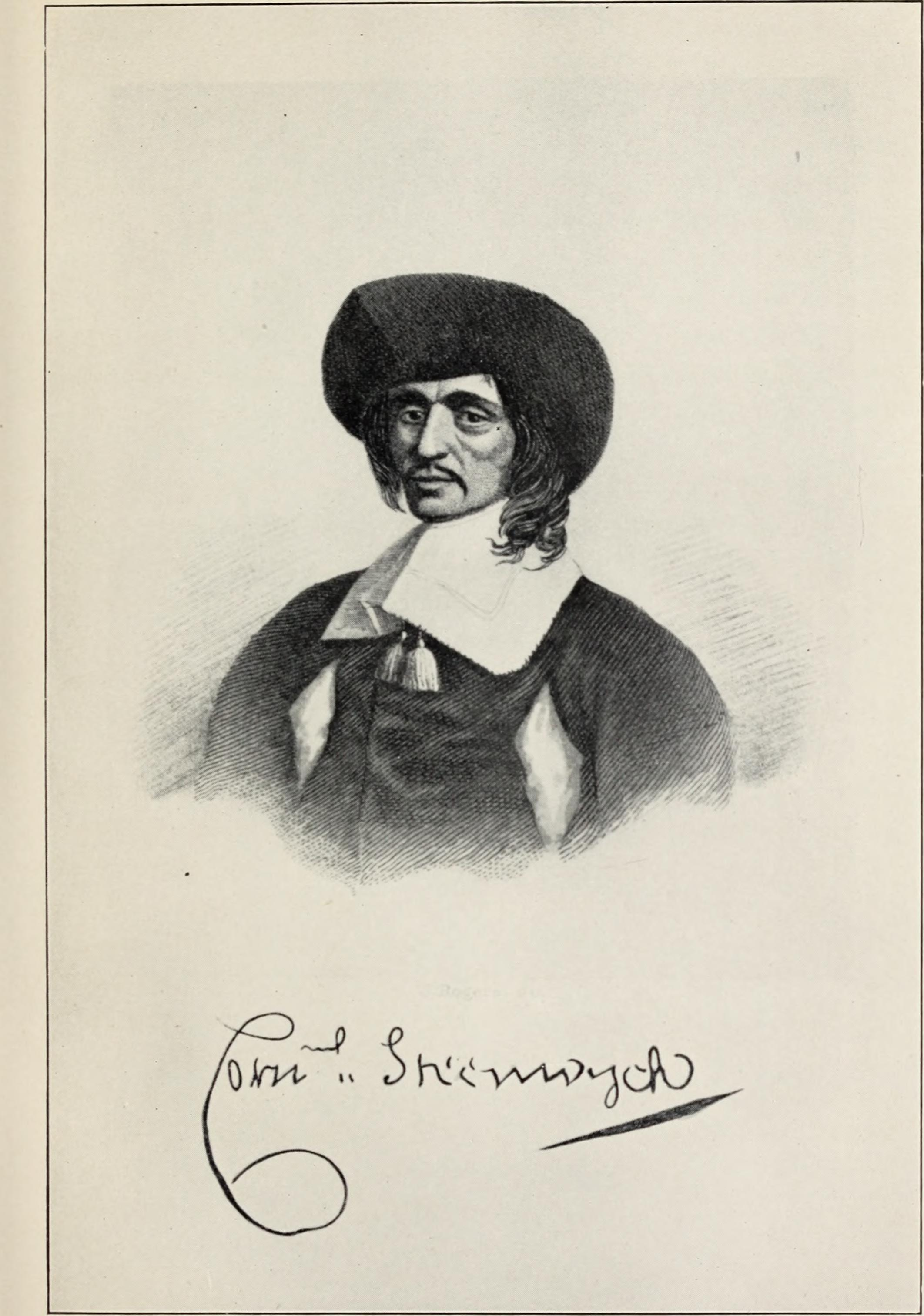

4th and 15th Mayor of New York City
- In office 1682–1684
- Preceded by: William Dyre
- Succeeded by: Gabriel Minvielle
- In office 1668–1671
- Preceded by: Thomas Willett
- Succeeded by: Thomas Delavall

Personal details
- Born: 16 March 1626 Haarlem, Dutch Republic
- Died: 21 November 1684 (aged 58) New York City

Cornelius Steenwyck (Note: Other spellings of his name include Cornelis Steenwijck, Cornelius Steenwyk, and Van Steenwyk.) (né Cornelis Jacobszoon (abbr. Jacobsz.) Steenwijck; 16 March 1626 – 21 November 1684) served two terms as Mayor of New York City in the British colonial Province of New York, the first from 1668 to 1670/72 and the second from 1682 to 1683/84.

== Nominal governor of Acadia ==
Coat of Arms of Cornelius Steenwyk

He also briefly served as governor of the Dutch West India Company's paper claim over New Holland in 1676, although his only attempt to actually assert Dutch control over the territory was rebuffed at Fort Pentagouet by three war ships from Boston. The Dutch colonial claim over Acadia was surrendered in 1678 by the Treaties of Nijmegen.

== Inventory of his estate ==
An inventory of his estate ordered 20 July 1686 ran 14 pages and totalled £4,382 (New York pounds), while a list of his debts ran 16 pages, and totalled £1,588, showing that Cornelis Steenwyck was one of the richest men in New York of his time.

== Legacy ==
Steenwick Avenue in The Bronx is named after him.

== See also ==
- History of New York City (1665–1783)
