= Nicholas De Mayer =

Mayor of New York City from 1676 to 1677

Nicholas Meyer

10th Mayor of New York City
- In office October 14, 1676 – 1677
- Governor: Edmund Andros
- Preceded by: William Dervall
- Succeeded by: Stephanus Van Cortlandt

Personal details
- Born: July 10, 1635 Hamburg, Holy Roman Empire
- Died: March 19, 1691 (aged 55) New York City, New York
- Spouse(s): Lydia Van Dyck (dates unknown); Sarah Kellnar (dates unknown)

Nicholaes DeMeyer (DeMayer or Meyer) (c. July 10, 1635 – March 19, 1691) was the tenth mayor of New York City, in the English colony of New York. He was appointed mayor by Governor Edmund Andros on October 14, 1676, and served until 1677.

== Family ==
DeMayer was from Hamburg. He is known to have been married twice, once to Lydia Van Dyck and once to Sarah Kellnar. At one time, DeMayer was described as "the second-wealthiest man in the New Netherlands".

DeMayer's father in law, Hendrick Van Dyke, is notable for starting the Peach War by shooting a Native American woman picking peaches on his property. Nicholas also participated in this war.

== Variant spellings of his name ==
Due to the various means of spelling his name, and the non-standard bookkeeping practices of the time, DeMayer's name has been found in many forms:

- Nicholaes DeMeyer
- Nicholas de Meyer
- Nicholas de Meyer Van Holstein
- Nicholas Meyer Van Hamborg
- Nicholas DeMayer
- Nicholas Meyer
- Nicholas DeMeirt
- Nicholas Demeyrt
- N.D. Meijer
- Nicholas Meyers
