= Gabriel Minvielle =

Mayor of New York City from 1684 to 1685

16th Mayor of New York City
- In office 1684–1685
- Preceded by: Cornelius Van Steenwyk
- Succeeded by: Nicholas Bayard

Personal details
- Born: Bordeaux, France
- Died: 1702 New York
- Resting place: Trinity Church

Gabriel Minvielle was a prominent Huguenot who settled in New York after emigrating from France in 1673. He engaged in foreign trade, especially with the West Indies, and prospered as a merchant and trader and also politically. He served as the 16th Mayor of New York City from 1684 until 1685. Minvielle was later honored several times by appointment as a member of the Governor's Council.

Minvielle was integral to the creation of the Huguenot settlement in New Rochelle, New York in 1688.

== See also ==
- List of mayors of New York City
