= Islip, Northamptonshire =

Village in Northamptonshire, England

Coordinates: 52.399°N 0.554°W

Islip
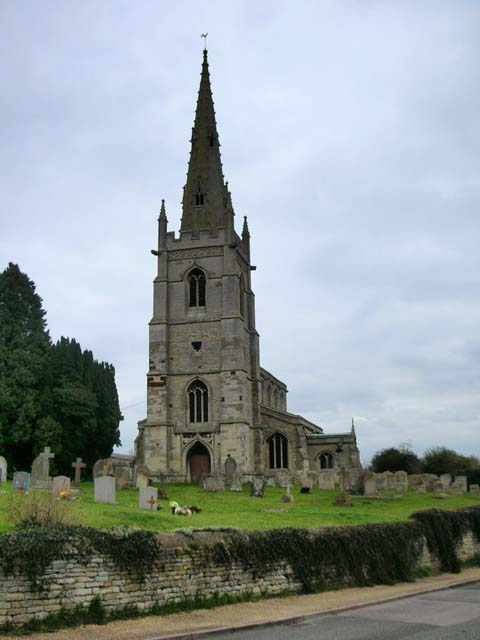
- St Nicholas' Church, Islip

- Location within Northamptonshire
- Population: 829 (2011 census)
- OS grid reference: SP9878
- Civil parish: Islip
- Unitary authority: North Northamptonshire
- Ceremonial county: Northamptonshire
- Region: East Midlands
- Country: England
- Sovereign state: United Kingdom
- Post town: Kettering
- Postcode district: NN14
- Dialling code: 01832
- Police: Northamptonshire
- Fire: Northamptonshire
- Ambulance: East Midlands
- UK Parliament: Corby and East Northamptonshire
- Website: Islip Parish Web Site

Islip (/ˈaɪzlɪp/ EYEZ-lip) is a village and civil parish in North Northamptonshire, England. The village is just west of Thrapston and 7 miles (11 km) east of Kettering. The parish is bounded to the east by the River Nene and to the north by Harpurs Brook, a tributary of the Nene. The 2011 census recorded the parish's population as 829 people.

The village's name means 'Slippery place by the River Ise'. The parish is situated on the River Nene, some way from its confluence with the River Ise; it has been suggested that this part of the Nene may have once been called the Ise. Another source suggests Ise is a "pre-English" river name meaning "water."

== Parish church ==
Islip had a parish church by the early 13th century but the present Perpendicular Gothic Church of England parish church of Saint Nicholas was built early in the 15th century. St. Nicholas' shares a benefice with the parishes of Thrapston and Denford.

== Social and economic history ==
The manor of Islip was held by Geoffrey de Mowbray, Bishop of Coutances in 1086. When he lost his English estates a few years later due to rebellion, the Crown granted part of the manor to Westminster Abbey and, in the early 12th century, part to Aubrey de Vere II, a royal chamberlain. Aubrey's son Robert held in Islip, Drayton, and Addington, Northamptonshire.

Matthias Nicoll moved to New York from Islip in 1664. He was Mayor of New York in 1671. The town of Islip in Suffolk County, New York is named after the Northamptonshire village.

=== The Iron Industry ===
Quarrying for iron ore began to the south west of the village in 1869. An ironworks was built close to the quarries and next to the Kettering to Huntingdon railway. The works began production of pig iron in 1873. The works became the centre of a network of quarries and mines not just near Islip but in the surrounding district over the next seventy or so years. Tramways brought the ore to the works from the immediate area as well as from Slipton, Twywell, Lowick and Sudborough. Most of the ore was smelted in the Islip works but at various times it was also taken to works at Wellingborough, Corby and further afield. This ore was transhipped into main line rail wagons at the sidings that were built next to the iron works. The Islip quarries were worked for iron ore on and off up to 1919 and again in 1933. Limestone was also quarried between 1900 and 1931. An iron mine called the Church Mine was begun 1910 The entrance was from one of the Islip quarries. Another mine was begun in 1923 with an entrance near Lowick called Church Mine North.The tramways in the open air were built to a 3-foot gauge but in the mines there were 2 foot 6 inch tramways. Haulage was at first by horses but from 1875 steam locomotives were introduced on the 3 foot gauge. In the mines horses were used throughout although things changed in the 1930s.

The quarries, mines and works come under the control of the company that ran the Corby ironworks in 1930. They increased production and in 1933 the Church Mine and Church Mine North were connected underground. Henceforward the southern entrance close to the works was used.for both mines. They introduced diesel locomotives in the mines from 1933 except in the headings where horses were still used. In 1933 production was doubled. The ironworks continued production until 1942. During that time the works produced iron for casting, whereas the Corby works produced basic iron for steel making (from 1936 at the new Corby Steel Works.) In 1941 there was a proposal to convert the 3 foot gauge tramways to standard gauge and to connect them to the Corby works system to enable transport to those works without transhipment (except at the mine exit) or use of the main line railway route through Kettering. However this never happened. The quarries and mines at Slipton had closed by this time. The mine closed in 1947 and the Twywell quarries in 1948.The quarries at Lowick and Sudborough continued until 1952, still sending their ore by tramway past the village of Islip to the Islip sidings for transhipment to the main line. Calcined ore which had been left near to the ironworks was extracted until 1969.

The site of the iron works was occupied by various industrial and commercial concerns after closure. Some of the original buildings remain but others have been demolished. Some traces remain of the quarries but much has been filled in with landfill rubbish or otherwise. Similarly some traces of the tramways remain. The entrances to the mines have been sealed but in one place the surface above the mine collapsed in 1985.
