= William Nichol =

William Nichol may refer to:

- William Nichol (cricketer) (1912–1973), Scottish cricketer
- William E. Nichol (1918–2006), American politician in Nebraska
- William Nichol (mayor) (1800–1878), American banker and mayor of Nashville, Tennessee

== See also ==
- Wilfred Nichol (1901–1955), British athlete sometimes referred to mistakenly as William Nichol
- William Nicholl (1868–1922), rugby union footballer of the 1890s
- William Nicoll (disambiguation)
