= John Watts (New York politician) =

American politician

John Watts Jr.
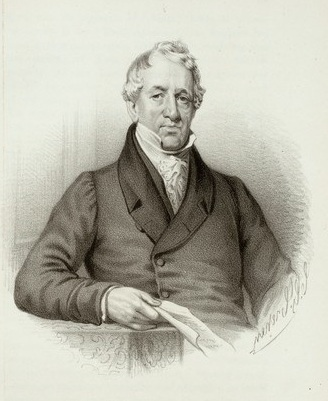

Member of the U.S. House of Representatives from New York's 2nd district
- In office March 4, 1793 – March 3, 1795
- Preceded by: John Laurance
- Succeeded by: Edward Livingston

Speaker of the New York State Assembly
- In office January 5, 1791 – June 30, 1793
- Preceded by: Gulian Verplanck
- Succeeded by: James Watson

Member of the New York State Assembly
- In office July 1, 1788 – June 30, 1793

Recorder of New York City
- In office 1774–1784
- Preceded by: Robert R. Livingston
- Succeeded by: Richard Varick

Personal details
- Born: August 27, 1749 New York City, Province of New York, British America
- Died: September 3, 1836 (aged 87) New York City, U.S.
- Party: Pro-Administration
- Spouse: Jane DeLancey (m. 1775; died 1809)
- Relations: John de Peyster (grandson); Marquess of Ailsa (nephew); Philip Kearny (grandson)
- Children: 11
- Parent(s): John Watts; Ann DeLancey Watts
- Education: King's College

John Watts Jr. (August 27, 1749 – September 3, 1836) was an American lawyer and politician from New York City who represented New York in the U.S. House of Representatives.

== Life ==
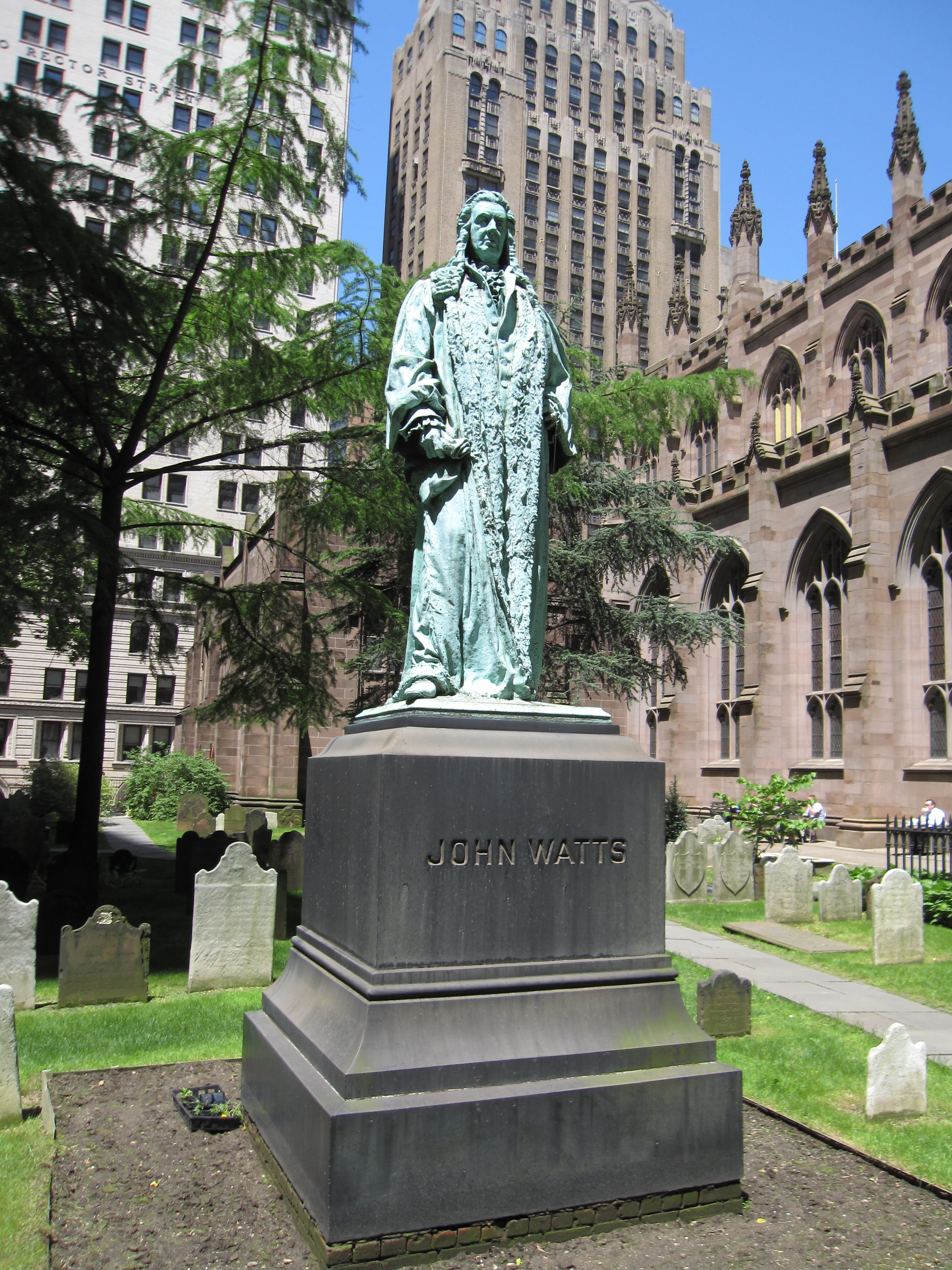
Statue of John Watts in the Trinity Church Cemetery in New York

John Watts was born on August 27, 1749, in New York City. He was the son of John Watts (1715–1789), a Scottish immigrant from a wealthy family, and Ann DeLancey (1723–1784), a descendant of the Schuyler family and Van Cortlandt family. His elder brother, Robert Watts (1743–1814), was married to Mary Alexander, the daughter of Lord Stirling. His younger siblings included Anne Watts (1744–1783), who was married to Archibald Kennedy, 11th Earl of Cassilis (the parents of Archibald Kennedy, 1st Marquess of Ailsa), Susannah Watts (1749–1823), who was married to Phillip Kearney, Mary Nicoll Watts (1751–1815), who was married to Sir John Johnson, 2nd Baronet, Stephen Watts, who was married to Sarah Nugent, and Margaret Watts, who was married to Robert Leake.

His maternal grandparents were the French born Etienne de Lancy (1663–1741), a minor member of the French nobility, and Anne van Cortlandt (1676–1724), the third child of Gertrude Schuyler (b. 1654) and Stephanus van Cortlandt (1643–1700), the Chief Justice of the Province of New York.

He completed preparatory studies, graduated with an A.M. degree from King's College in May 1769, and studied law.

== Career ==
In 1774, he was appointed the Recorder of New York City under Mayor David Mathews, and was the last to serve in this role under the English Crown. The role included serving as a "mayoral assistant, judge, and in sundry administrative and judicial functions."

His father, a Loyalist, fled the colonies to England during the Revolutionary War. In 1779, his properties, including his "Rose Hill" estate (which is now occupied by Fordham University), were seized by the New York State Legislature. Watts and his brother Robert petitioned for the attainder to be overturned. They were unable to have it overturned but were allowed to buy back their father's properties.

=== Post Revolutionary War ===
From 1788 to 1789 and again from 1791 to 1793, Watts was a member of the New York State Assembly serving as Speaker of the Assembly from 1791 to 1793. He was a member of the commission to build Newgate Prison in New York City, in use between 1797 and 1829.

In 1793, he was elected as a Pro-Administration Party representative to the 3rd United States Congress succeeding John Laurance to represent New York's 2nd congressional district. He served in the U.S. Congress from March 4, 1793, until March 3, 1795. He was defeated in his run for re-election by Edward Livingston.

He was a judge of Westchester County, New York from 1802 to 1807. He was also a member of Westchester Masonic Lodge No. 46 (now Huguenot Masonic Lodge No.46).

=== Leake and Watts Orphan Asylum ===
In 1831, Watts organized the Leake and Watts Orphan Asylum after his friend (who was also his sister Margaret's brother-in-law), John George Leake (1752–1827), died with no children or living siblings. Leake and Watts Services is now called Rising Ground. Leakes had left his personal property (valued at about $300,000) and real estate (worth an additional $86,000), to Watts' son provided he change his name to "Robert Leake." While Watts son made the change, he died a few months later, leaving no will. The real estate was escheated to the State because of technical problems of the "will", however, the personal property passed to Watts who used it to found the Orphan Asylum.

== Personal life ==
In 1775, Watts married Jane Delancey (1750–1809) in a double wedding, along with her sister, Susannah Delancey (1754–1837), who married Thomas Henry Barclay. The sisters were daughters of Peter DeLancey (who served in the New York Provincial Assembly for many years) and Elizabeth Colden (daughter of Cadwallader Colden), and granddaughters of Stephen Delancey making them first cousins to John.

Together, John and Jane were the parents of eleven children. His grandson would later write that "Watts was a monument of affliction, in that he had seen his wife, six handsome, gifted, and gallant sons, and four daughters precede him to the grave. One childless daughter survived him and three grandchildren." The children included:

- George Watts, a First Lt. and aide-de-camp to General Winfield Scott from 1814 to 1815.
- Robert J. Watts, a captain in the 41st Infantry to whom John G. Leake left his extensive properties. Robert inherited Leake's estate but died very soon after.
- John Watts III.
- Ann Watts.
- Susan Watts (1795–1823), who married her cousin Philip Kearny (1780–1849).
- Elizabeth Watts (d. 1866), who married Henry Laight.
- Mary Justina Watts (1801–1821), who married Frederic de Peyster (1796–1882) in 1820.

John Watts died at his longtime home, 3 Broadway in New York City, on September 3, 1836. He was interred in a vault in Trinity Churchyard. In 1839, his family's Rose Hill estate and manor house were purchased by the Catholic Church to establish St. John's College.

=== Descendants ===
Through his daughter Susan, he was the grandfather of Gen. Philip Kearny (1815–1862), a United States Army officer notable for his leadership in the Mexican–American War and American Civil War who was killed in action in the 1862 Battle of Chantilly. He was interred in Watts's vault until being removed to Arlington National Cemetery.

Through his daughter Mary, he was the grandfather of John Watts de Peyster (1821–1907), a New York City author and philanthropist who married Estelle Livingston (1819–1898) in 1841.

Legal offices
Preceded by Robert R. Livingston	Recorder of New York City; 1774–1784	Succeeded by Richard Varick
Political offices
Preceded by Gulian Verplanck	Speaker of the New York State Assembly; 1791–1793	Succeeded by James Watson
U.S. House of Representatives
Preceded by John Laurance	Member of the U.S. House of Representatives from New York's 2nd congressional district 1793–1795	Succeeded by Edward Livingston
