= Thomas Nicoll (cricketer, born 1770) =

English cricketer (1770–1841)

Thomas Vere Richard Nicoll
Personal information
- Full name: Thomas Vere Richard Nicoll
- Nationality: English
- Born: 1770
- Died: 22 October 1841 (aged 70–71)

Sport
- Sport: Cricket

Thomas Vere Richard Nicoll (1770 – 22 October 1841) was an English amateur cricketer who made 12 known appearances in important matches from 1790 to 1794. He was mainly associated with Marylebone Cricket Club of which he was an early member.

Rector of St John the Baptist Church, Cherington, Warwickshire. 1794–1841
