= Matthias Nicoll =

Mayor of New York City (1672–73; 1674–75)

6th & 8th Mayor of New York City
- In office 1674–1675
- Preceded by: John Lawrence
- Succeeded by: William Dervall
- In office 1672–1673
- Preceded by: Thomas Delavall
- Succeeded by: John Lawrence

Personal details
- Born: 1630 Islip, Northamptonshire, England
- Died: December 22, 1687 (aged 56–57) Islip, Province of New York, British America

Matthias Nicoll (1630 – December 22, 1687), also known as Nicolls, was the sixth mayor of New York City from 1672 to 1673 and the eighth mayor from 1674 to 1675. He was the patriarch of the Nicoll family, which settled and owned much of Long Island, New York. Numerous place names on the island now bear the Nicoll name.

== Early life ==
Nicoll was born in 1627 and was the son of a minister. He lived in Islip, Northamptonshire, and practiced law there.

== Life in America ==
In 1664, he came to the North America with Richard Nicolls. It is not known if the two were related, although some sources say he was Richard's nephew. Matthias was Richard's secretary and was present to the first surrender of the Dutch New Amsterdam to the English. He was clerk of the court in the new English colony and served various judge roles. Using his experience as a lawyer, he wrote the set of laws for the new colony that were adopted by the Hempstead Convention in 1665.

In 1670, he bought land in present Plandome Manor, New York/Plandome, New York, and he is said to have named it for the Latin 'planus domus' meaning 'plain' or 'peaceful' home.

=== Political career ===
In 1672 he was appointed New York City mayor, and served for one year, until he was succeeded by John Lawrence.

In 1674, following the English reconquest of New York from the Dutch, Nicoll was sworn in for a second term. Contemporaneous records of Nicoll's second mayoralty were lost until the 1980s, and his status as the eighth mayor was thus historically absent from city documentation, meaning that the subsequent numbering of the city's mayors was off by one until being corrected at the beginning of 2026.

He was speaker of the General Assembly under Thomas Dongan in 1684 which guaranteed religious freedom to Christians.

== Personal life ==
Coat of Arms of Matthias Nicoll

He and his wife were buried in front of the manor home, although the exact spot is not now known because it was vandalized. A plaque on Plandome Road marks the general area.

One of his children, William Nicoll, would sell the Plandome Manor in 1718, then over 1000 acres, and move to his own estate of 100 square miles (260 km^{2}) on the Great South Bay in present-day Islip, New York. The Suffolk estate Islip was named after their ancestral home in England.

The manor house itself was torn down in 1998 by its new owner.
