= Richard Nicolls =

English military officer and colonial administrator (1624–1672)

Governor of New York
- In office 1664–1668
- Monarch: Charles II
- Preceded by: Peter Stuyvesant (as Director-General of New Netherland)
- Succeeded by: Francis Lovelace

Personal details
- Born: c. 1624 Ampthill, Bedfordshire
- Died: 28 May 1672 (aged 47–48) North Sea
- Relations: Matthias Nicolls (nephew); Sir George Bruce (grandfather)
- Parents: Francis Nicolls (father); Margaret Bruce (mother)

Richard Nicolls (c. 1624 – 28 May 1672) was an English military officer and colonial administrator who served as the first governor of the Province of New York from 1664 to 1668.

== Early life ==
Richard Nicolls was born in c. 1624 in Ampthill, Bedfordshire. He was the son of Francis Nicolls, a barrister and politician, and his wife Margaret. Francis and Margaret were married at Abbots Langley in 1609; she was the daughter of Sir George Bruce, a Scottish merchant who built Culross Palace, and a niece of Edward Bruce, 1st Lord Kinloss.

Nicolls's coat of arms

== Career ==
He commanded a royalist troop of horse (i.e., cavalry) during the English Civil War, and on the defeat of the king went into exile. Soon after the Restoration he became Groom of the Chamber to the Duke of York.

=== Province of New York ===
Through the influence of the Duke of York, in 1664 Nicolls was appointed to a commission with Sir Robert Carr (d. 1667), George Cartwright, and Samuel Maverick, to conquer New Netherlands from the Dutch and regulate the affairs of the New England colonies and settle disputes among them. The expedition set sail from Portsmouth on 25 May 1664, and arrived for the capture of New Amsterdam on 27 August 1664. New Amsterdam was surrendered to Nicolls on 8 September 1664. Under authority of a commission from the Duke (later King James) Nicolls assumed the position of deputy-governor of New Netherlands (New York).

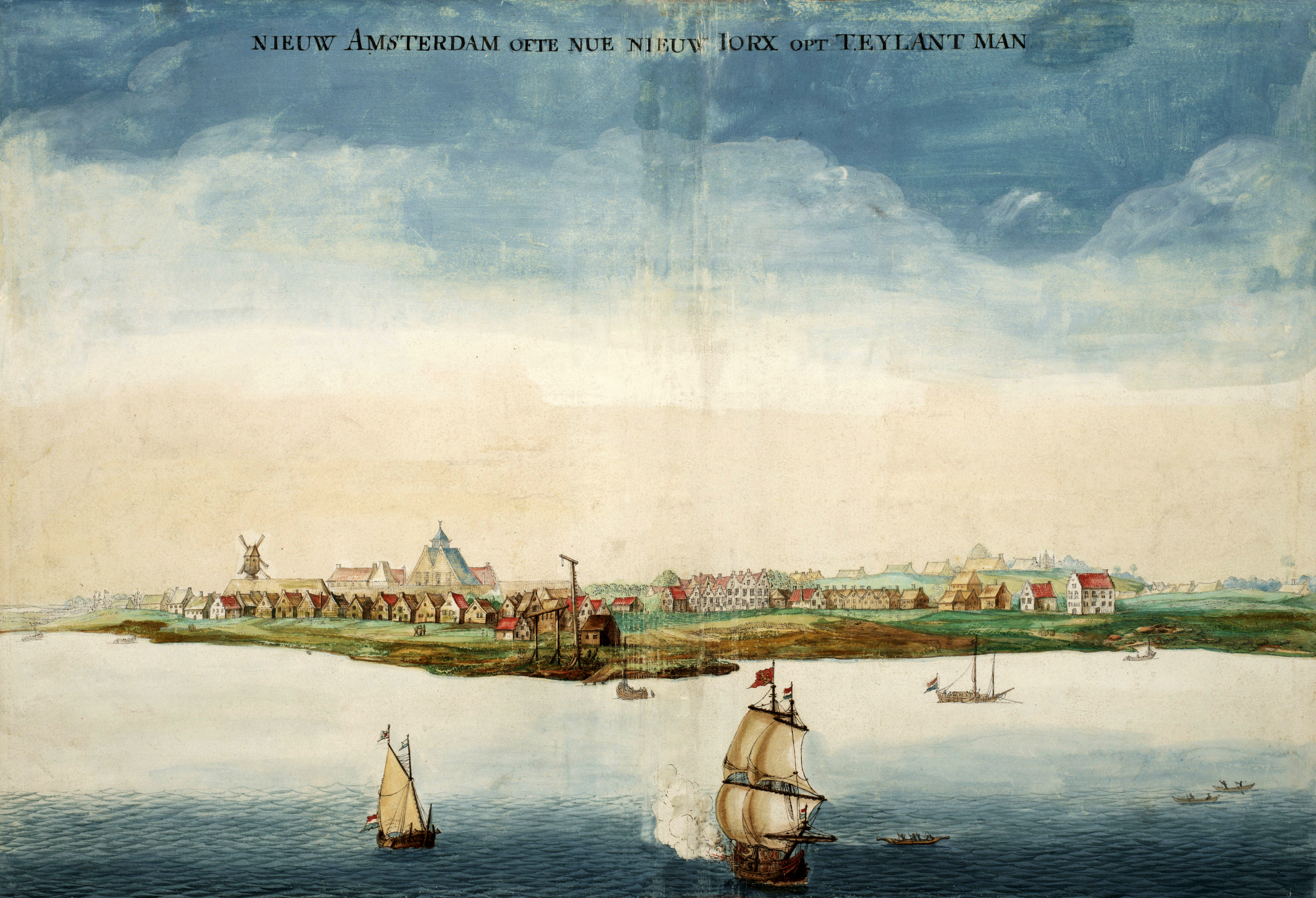
NIEUW AMSTERDAM OFTE NUE NIEUW IORX OPT TEYLANT MAN by Johannes Vingboons (1664), an early picture of Nieuw Amsterdam made in the year when it was conquered by the English under Richard Nicolls.

He made 74th Street, beginning at the East River, the southern border patent line (which was called the "Harlem Line") of the village of Nieuw Haarlem (later, the village of Harlem); the English also renamed the village "Lancaster".

In 1663, one year prior to the English gaining control of the New Netherland colony and appointing Nicolls as governor, the Esopus Wars concluded in present-day Ulster County, New York. Waged over territorial disputes between the Esopus natives and Dutch settlers, the conflict left lingering tensions that Nicolls sought to pacify to prevent future hostilities.

Ultimately, the Nicolls–Esopus Indian Treaty was ratified in 1665. Among the treaty’s many terms, the Esopus, “in the names of themselves and their heirs forever,” agreed to “give, grant, alienate, and confirme all their right and interest, claime or demand, to a certaine parcell of land,” including the city of Kingston and extending to present-day Kerhonkson. In exchange, the natives received “forty blankets, twenty pounds of powder, twenty knives, six kettles, [and] twelve barrs of lead,” as well as “three laced red coats” presented as gifts to the tribal leaders. Furthermore, the British and Esopus established a system of trade that included a protected trade path for the Esopus to travel unharmed and a safe house where the Esopus could stay when visiting the village. The treaty was respected for generations—as evidenced by records of commemorative annual gatherings attended by Esopus leaders and local residents—and it remains recognized and celebrated today by both the City of Kingston and descendants of the Esopus.

==== Legal System ====
His policy was vigorous but tactful, and the transition to the new regime was made smoothly and with due regard to the interests of the conquered people. The formerly Dutch colonists were guaranteed in the possession of their property rights, their laws of inheritance, and the enjoyment of religious freedom. The English system of law and administration was at once introduced into Long Island, Staten Island and Westchester, where the English element already predominated, but the change was made much more slowly in the Dutch sections.

A code of laws, known as the "Duke's Laws", drafted by the governor with the help of his secretary and nephew Matthias Nicolls, was proclaimed at Hempstead, Long Island, on 1 March 1665 and continued in force until 1683; the code was compiled from the codes of the New England colonies, and it provided for trial by jury, for proportional taxation on property, for the issuance of new patents for land and for land tenure only by license from the duke.

=== Return to England ===
Nicolls returned to England in the summer of 1668 and continued in the service of the Duke of York. He was replaced by Francis Lovelace as New York governor. He was killed by a cannonball in the naval battle of Southwold Bay on 28 May 1672. His monument at Ampthill incorporates the exact cannonball that killed him.

Government offices
Preceded by Peter Stuyvesant as Director-General of New Netherland	Proprietary Governor of the Province of New York; 1664–1668	Succeeded by Francis Lovelace
