= Arent De Peyster =

British military officer (1736–1822)

Arent Schuyler De Peyster
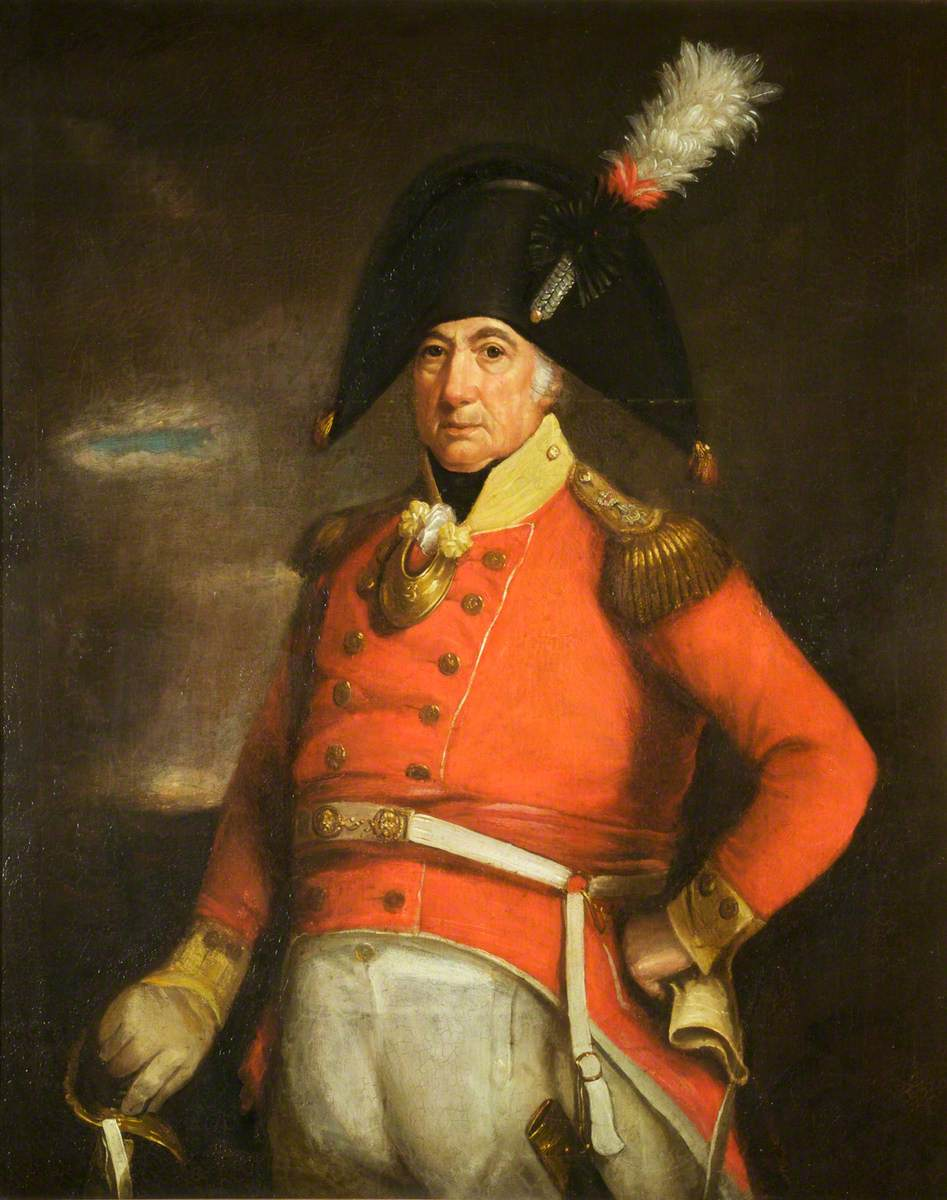
- 1794–1822 portrait
- Born: 27 June 1736; New York City, Province of New York
- Died: 26 November 1822 (aged 86); Dumfries, Scotland
- Spouse: Rebecca Blair (d. 1827)
- Parent(s): Pierre Guillaume De Peyster; Cornelia Schuyler
- Relatives: Abraham de Peyster (grandfather); Arent Schuyler (grandfather); Peter Schuyler (uncle)
- Military career
- Allegiance: Great Britain; United Kingdom
- Branch: British Army; British Volunteer Corps
- Service years: 1755–1802
- Rank: Colonel
- Units: Shirley's Regiment; 51st Regiment of Foot
- Commands: 8th Regiment of Foot; Royal Dumfries Volunteers
- Conflicts: French and Indian War; American War of Independence; French Revolutionary Wars

Colonel Arent Schuyler De Peyster (27 June 1736 – 26 November 1822) was a British military officer best known for his term as commandant of Fort Michilimackinac and Fort Detroit during the American War of Independence. Following the capture of Lieutenant-Governor General Henry Hamilton in 1779, De Peyster became the de facto military leader of British and Indigenous forces in the Ohio Country and the upper Great Lakes region.

== Early life ==
De Peyster was a native of New York City, the son of Pierre Guillaume De Peyster (1707–1785) and Cornelia Schuyler (1715–1785). His maternal grandparents were Arent Schuyler (1662–1730) and Swantje Van Duyckhuysen (1679–1724), and his paternal grandparents were Catharina De Peyster and Abraham De Peyster (1657–1728), the 20th Mayor of New York City. His godparents were his uncles, Philip van Cortlandt (1683–1746) and Peter Schuyler (1707–1762) and his godmother was his aunt, Eva Schuyler Bayard (died 1737). Arent was educated in London and obtained a commission as ensign in time for the Seven Years' War.

== Career ==
De Peyster was educated in London and after returning to British America, received a commission as an ensign in the British Army in 1755. He joined the 50th Regiment of Foot, which had been raised in America in 1748 by William Shirley, the Governor of the Province of Massachusetts Bay. In 1745, Shirley, along with De Peyster's uncle, Colonel Peter Schuyler, had directed the Siege of Louisbourg against the French in today’s Nova Scotia. De Peyster next held a commission in the 51st Foot, a regiment raised by Lieutenant General Robert Napier in America, which at one point, had three Schuylers in it.

During the French and Indian War, he served under his uncle in the Province of New York, gaining experience in frontier warfare. He was captured, held as prisoner in France, and after being exchanged, served out the war with the 8th Regiment of Foot in Germany.

In 1768, the 8th Regiment was assigned to the Province of Quebec, and De Peyster enjoyed a series of promotions. In 1774, he was appointed commandant of Fort Michilimackinac, in present-day Mackinaw City, Michigan. De Peyster spent the next five years at the fort.

=== American War of Independence ===
c. 1791 portrait of De Peyster

Until the summer of 1777 British policy during the American War of Independence was for their Indian allies to be ready to support the Crown but remain inactive. When the policy changed De Peyster recruited Ojibwe and Odawa from the upper Great Lakes region to support the 1777 campaign of General John Burgoyne in De Peyster's native New York. He was rewarded with a promotion to major.

In 1779 De Peyster took over as commandant of Fort Detroit. De Peyster, by his tact and the adoption of conciliatory measures, effectively managed Britain's Indigenous allies against American militia from Pennsylvania and Kentucky. Although Britain ceded control of Detroit to the United States at the end of the war, Detroit remained in British control until 1796.

In November 1783, De Peyster was promoted to Lieutenant-Colonel of the 8th Foot and transferred to Fort Niagara, situated at the mouth of the Niagara River. He did not depart for Niagara until 30 May 1784, where he assumed command on 5 June 1784. In the summer of 1785, he returned to England with the regiment and continued to serve, eventually receiving a commission as colonel on 12 October 1793.

=== Later life ===
He retired in 1794 due to illness, and sold his lieutenant-colonelcy to an associate of John Fane, 10th Earl of Westmorland, the then Lord Lieutenant of Ireland. Ten years later, De Peyster had still not been paid. Upon his retirement, DePeyster and his wife moved to Dumfries, where they settled down at Mavis Grove, a country estate.

On 31 January 1795, De Peyster raised the Royal Dumfries Volunteers, a unit of the newly-formed British Volunteer Corps, as its colonel. The Volunteer Corps had been established in 1794 to defend Britain against foreign invasion. One of the original members of the Volunteers was Robert Burns, the prominent Scottish poet, who dedicated to De Peyster his "Poem on Life," and with De Peyster carried on a poetical controversy in the columns of the Dumfries Journal. De Peyster, also wrote poetry and published Miscellanies, by an Officer in 1813.

== Personal life ==
After the Seven Years' War, when the 8th Foot was stationed in Scotland, De Peyster married Rebecca Blair (d. 1827), a daughter of Bryce Blair, Provost of Dumfries, and aunt to Lieutenant-Colonel Bryce McMurdo. They purportedly had a happy but childless marriage and were seldom apart.

De Peyster died as the result of an accident on 26 November 1822 in Dumfries, Scotland. A large funeral was given in his honor, and he was buried in St Michael's Churchyard. His wife died on 20 February 1827.

== Notes ==
de Peyster family tree
- Johannes de Peyster Sr. (c. 1600–c. 1685)
  - Abraham de Peyster (1657–1728), Mayor of New York City
    - Catherine de Peyster, married Philip Van Cortlandt, son of Stephanus Van Cortlandt
      - Pierre Van Cortlandt (1721–1814)
    - Abraham de Peyster (1696–1767), Treasurer of the Province of New York, married Margaret Van Cortlandt, daughter of Jacobus Van Cortlandt
      - James Abraham de Peyster (1726–1799)
        - Capt. Abraham de Peyster (1753–1798), married Catherine Livingston, granddaughter of Philip Livingston
        - Frederick de Peyster (1758–1834)
          - James Ferguson de Peyster (1794–1874), married (1) Susan Maria Clarkson (1800–1823), daughter of Matthew Clarkson; married (2) Frances Goodhue Ashton (1805–1871)
            - Susan Maria de Peyster (1823–1910), married Robert Edward Livingston (1820–1889)
              - Goodhue Livingston (1867–1951), an architect, married Louisa Robb (1877–1960), daughter of James Hampden Robb
            - Frederic James de Peyster (1839–1905), lawyer, married Augusta McEvers Morris (1851–1911)
          - Frederic de Peyster (1796–1882), lawyer
            - John Watts de Peyster (1821–1907), military officer, married Estelle Livingston
              - John Watts de Peyster Jr. (1841–1873), Union Army officer
              - Johnston de Peyster (1846–1903), New York State Assembly member
    - Pierre Guillaume de Peyster (b. 1707), married Cornelia Schuyler
      - Arent DePeyster (1736–1822), British military officer
      - Pierre Guillaume de Peyster (1745–1807)
        - William Sheriff de Peyster, married Mary Roosevelt, niece of Nicholas Roosevelt
        - Cornelia de Peyster, married Jacob R. Van Rensselaer
  - Johannes de Peyster (1666–1719), Mayor of New York City, married Anna Bancker, sister of Albany mayor Evert Bancker
    - Johannes de Peyster III (1694–1783), married Anna Schuyler, daughter of Albany mayor Myndert Schuyler
      - Anna de Peyster (1723–1794), who married Albany mayor Volkert P. Douw
    - Maria de Peyster, married Gerard Bancker
      - Gerard Bancker (1740–1799), surveyor and politician
    - William de Peyster, married Margaret Roosevelt
      - William de Peyster
        - Elizabeth de Peyster, married Charles Willson Peale (1741–1827), painter
          - Franklin Peale (1795–1870), Philadelphia Mint officer
          - Titian Peale (1799–1885), naturalist
    - Catharina de Peyster, married Hendrick Rutgers (1712–1779)
      - Henry Rutgers (1745–1830), Revolutionary War hero, namesake of Rutgers University
  - Elizabeth de Peyster, married New Jersey provincial Governor John Hamilton
  - Maria de Peyster, married New York City Mayor David Provost
