= De Peyster (surname) =

De Peyster (also spelled DePuyster and dePeyster) is a surname of Dutch origin. It is also a town, De Peyster, New York.

== People ==
=== Surname ===
- Abraham de Peyster (1657–1728), the 20th Mayor of New York City from 1691 to 1694
- Abraham de Peyster (captain) (1753–1798), American Loyalist officer and Treasurer of New Brunswick
- Abraham de Peyster (treasurer) (1696–1767), treasurer of the province of New York
- Anna dePeyster (née Torv, formerly Murdoch and Mann; 1944–2026), British and Australian journalist and novelist
  - Ashton dePeyster, her husband
- Arent de Peyster (1736–1822; also spelt DePeyster), an American-born British loyalist military officer, commandant of the British controlled Fort Michilimackinac and Fort Detroit during the American Revolution
- Elizabeth dePeyster, wife of Charles Willson Peale (1741–1827), American painter, soldier, scientist, inventor, politician, and naturalist
- Frederic de Peyster (1796–1882), New York City lawyer
- Frederic James de Peyster (1839–1905), prominent American soldier, lawyer, and member of New York Society during the Gilded Age
- Johannes de Peyster Sr. (1600–1685), a Dutch merchant who emigrated to New Amsterdam.
- Johannes de Peyster (1666–1719), the 23rd Mayor of New York City between 1698 and 1699
- Johannes de Peyster III (1694–1783), the Mayor of Albany who served three times between 1729 and 1742
- John Watts de Peyster (1821–1907), author on the art of war, philanthropist, and early Adjutant General of the New York National Guard
- John Watts de Peyster Jr. (1841–1873), soldier in the Union Army during the American Civil War
- Johnston de Peyster (1846–1903), soldier in the Union Army during the American Civil War, member of the New York State Assembly

=== Given name ===
- De Peyster Brown DFC (1915–1991), American fighter pilot who volunteered to fly for the British Royal Air Force in World War II
- James de Peyster Ogden (1790–1870), American merchant and businessman

== Fictional characters ==
- Mr and Mrs DePeyster, characters in the 1955 short film Bedlam in Paradise starring the Three Stooges

== See also ==
- Watts De Peyster Fireman's Hall, located on Broadway in the village of Tivoli, New York, United States

Media related to De Peyster (surname) at Wikimedia Commons
