= Gerard Bancker =

American surveyor and politician

Gerard Bancker (sometimes Latin Gerardus, or colloquial Dutch Gerrit) (14 February 1740 in Albany, New York – January 1799) was an American surveyor and politician.

== Life ==
Coat of Arms of Gerard Bancker

Bancker was the son of Gerard Bancker Sr. and Maria de Peyster, who had married in New York City in 1731. He was the grandson of Johannes de Peyster (1666–1719), the 23rd Mayor of New York City between 1698 and 1699, and great-grandson of Johannes de Peyster, Sr., the Huguenot first settler of the De Peyster family in North America.

Bancker was elected to the American Philosophical Society in 1772, and in 1774, as city surveyor, he made a map of St. George's Ferry on Nassau Island.

He was Deputy Treasurer from 1776 to 1778, and New York State Treasurer from 1778 to 1798.

He collected a large number of broadsides from the revolutionary era which were sold at auction in 1898 in Philadelphia.

== Sources ==
- Political Graveyard
- The New York Civil List compiled by Franklin Benjamin Hough (page 35; Weed, Parsons and Co., 1858) (Google Books)

Political offices
Preceded by Peter Van Brugh Livingston	New York State Treasurer; 1778–1798	Succeeded by Robert McClellan

de Peyster family tree
- Johannes de Peyster Sr. (c. 1600–c. 1685)
  - Abraham de Peyster (1657–1728), Mayor of New York City
    - Catherine de Peyster, married Philip Van Cortlandt, son of Stephanus Van Cortlandt
      - Pierre Van Cortlandt (1721–1814)
    - Abraham de Peyster (1696–1767), Treasurer of the Province of New York, married Margaret Van Cortlandt, daughter of Jacobus Van Cortlandt
      - James Abraham de Peyster (1726–1799)
        - Capt. Abraham de Peyster (1753–1798), married Catherine Livingston, granddaughter of Philip Livingston
        - Frederick de Peyster (1758–1834)
          - James Ferguson de Peyster (1794–1874), married (1) Susan Maria Clarkson (1800–1823), daughter of Matthew Clarkson; married (2) Frances Goodhue Ashton (1805–1871)
            - Susan Maria de Peyster (1823–1910), married Robert Edward Livingston (1820–1889)
              - Goodhue Livingston (1867–1951), an architect, married Louisa Robb (1877–1960), daughter of James Hampden Robb
            - Frederic James de Peyster (1839–1905), lawyer, married Augusta McEvers Morris (1851–1911)
          - Frederic de Peyster (1796–1882), lawyer
            - John Watts de Peyster (1821–1907), military officer, married Estelle Livingston
              - John Watts de Peyster Jr. (1841–1873), Union Army officer
              - Johnston de Peyster (1846–1903), New York State Assembly member
    - Pierre Guillaume de Peyster (b. 1707), married Cornelia Schuyler
      - Arent DePeyster (1736–1822), British military officer
      - Pierre Guillaume de Peyster (1745–1807)
        - William Sheriff de Peyster, married Mary Roosevelt, niece of Nicholas Roosevelt
        - Cornelia de Peyster, married Jacob R. Van Rensselaer
  - Johannes de Peyster (1666–1719), Mayor of New York City, married Anna Bancker, sister of Albany mayor Evert Bancker
    - Johannes de Peyster III (1694–1783), married Anna Schuyler, daughter of Albany mayor Myndert Schuyler
      - Anna de Peyster (1723–1794), who married Albany mayor Volkert P. Douw
    - Maria de Peyster, married Gerard Bancker
      - Gerard Bancker (1740–1799), surveyor and politician
    - William de Peyster, married Margaret Roosevelt
      - William de Peyster
        - Elizabeth de Peyster, married Charles Willson Peale (1741–1827), painter
          - Franklin Peale (1795–1870), Philadelphia Mint officer
          - Titian Peale (1799–1885), naturalist
    - Catharina de Peyster, married Hendrick Rutgers (1712–1779)
      - Henry Rutgers (1745–1830), Revolutionary War hero, namesake of Rutgers University
  - Elizabeth de Peyster, married New Jersey provincial Governor John Hamilton
  - Maria de Peyster, married New York City Mayor David Provost
