= Mary Alexander =

British American merchant

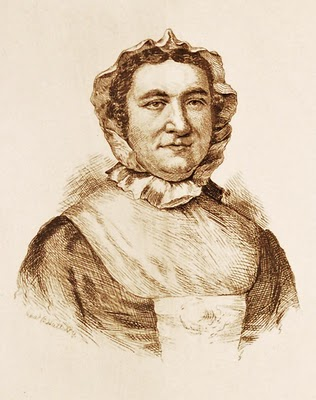
- Born: Mary Spratt; April 16, 1693; New York
- Died: April 18, 1760 (aged 67); New York City, Province of New York, British America
- Resting place: Trinity Church Cemetery
- Spouses: Samuel Provoost (m. 1711; died 1719) James Alexander (m. 1721; died 1756)
- Children: 10, including William
- Relatives: Samuel Provoost (grandson); John Stevens III (grandson); John Rutherfurd (grandson); Abraham de Peyster (uncle); Johannes de Peyster (uncle); David Provoost (stepfather)

Mary Spratt Provoost Alexander (April 16, 1693 – April 18, 1760) was an influential colonial era merchant in New York City.

== Early life ==
Mary was born in New York City on April 16, 1693. She was the daughter of John Spratt (c. 1650–1697) and Maria de Peyster (1659–1700), who were both from prominent families of colonial era New York.

Her father, John Spratt, was born near Glasgow, Scotland, and became a merchant in New York and a speaker for the irregular assembly during the Leisler Rebellion in 1689.

Her mother, Maria de Peyster, was from a respected Dutch family of goldsmiths. Her mother's siblings included Abraham de Peyster, the 20th Mayor of New York City, Johannes de Peyster, the 23rd Mayor of New York City, and Elizabeth de Peyster, who married John Hamilton, provincial governor of New Jersey. Her mother was first married to Paulus Schrick, and then remarried to John Spratt in 1687. After Spratt's death in 1697 she married again to one David Provoost (1670–1724), a merchant of Huguenot-Dutch ancestry who also served as the (24th) mayor of New York City. After Mary's mother died in 1700, the Spratt children went to live with their maternal grandmother, Cornelia DePeyster, a major merchant rated as one of the wealthiest people in New York in 1695. Her maternal grandfather was Johannes de Peyster Sr. (c. 1600–c. 1685), a Dutch merchant who emigrated to New Amsterdam.

== Career ==
Mary's life was divided between caring for her growing family, continuing the Provoost mercantile enterprises, and supporting her husband's political career. Mary played a pivotal role in the case of John Peter Zenger. She traveled to Philadelphia and successfully convinced prominent lawyer Andrew Hamilton to represent Zenger in his New York libel case.

Under her leadership, the Provoost business grew extensively. She imported goods on such a large scale that it was said that hardly a ship docked in New York City without a consignment of goods for her. She sold these goods in her own store and, during the French and Indian Wars, supplied William Shirley’s Fort Niagara expedition with food, tools, cannon, and boats. In 1743 her fortune was estimated at 100,000 pounds, and she and her family lived in a mansion on Broad Street. One of her sons, William Alexander, Lord Stirling, became her business partner.

== Personal life ==
On October 15, 1711, seventeen year old Mary Spratt married Samuel Provoost (d. 1719), a younger brother of her mother's third husband. Samuel Provoost was a merchant haberdasher, dry goods importer, and real estate agent. Mary invested her inheritance in his trading venture. She had three children with Provoost:

- Maria Provoost (1712–1713), who died young.
- John Provoost (1714–1767), who married Eva Rutgers (1719–1788), daughter of Harman Rutgers and aunt of Henry Rutgers, in 1741.
- David Provoost (1715–1741).

On June 5, 1721, widowed Mary Spratt Provoost married James Alexander (1691–1756), a prominent attorney and politician. Alexander immigrated to America in 1715 and became one of the leading lawyers in New York City. Mary Alexander had seven children by her second husband:

- Mary Alexander II (1721–1767), who married Peter Van Brugh Livingston (1710–1792), the son of Philip Livingston and brother of Governor William Livingston, in 1739.
- James Alexander (1723–1731), who died young.
- William Alexander (1725–1783), who married Sarah Livingston (1725–1805), a daughter of Philip Livingston, in 1748.
- Elizabeth Alexander (1726–1800), who married John Stevens (1715–1792), the Vice President of the New Jersey Legislative Council.
- Catherine Alexander (1727–1801), who married Walter Rutherfurd (d. 1804), who was born in Edgerston, Scotland, in 1758.
- Anna Alexander (1731–1736), who died young.
- Susannah Alexander (1737–1777), who married John Reid (1721–1807), a British army General and founder of the chair of music at the University of Edinburgh.

Alexander died on April 18, 1760. She was buried alongside her husband in the family vault at Trinity Church, Wall Street. Perhaps indicative of her social influence, the pallbearers at her funeral included the governors of New York and New Jersey.

=== Descendants ===
Mary was originally a member of the Dutch Reformed Church, but later joined the Anglican church. Her son John was the father of Samuel Provoost (1742–1815), the first Protestant Episcopal Bishop of New York.

Through her daughter Mary, she was the grandmother of 12 grandchildren, including Philip Peter Livingston (1740–1810).

Through her son William, she was the grandmother of three, William Alexander, Mary Alexander, who married a wealthy merchant named Robert Watts of New York, and Catherine Alexander, who married Congressman William Duer (1747–1799).

Through her daughter Elizabeth, she was the grandmother of John Stevens III (1749–1838), a lawyer, engineer, and inventor who constructed the first U.S. steam locomotive and first steam-powered ferry, and Mary Stevens (d. 1814), who married Chancellor Robert Livingston, negotiator of the Louisiana Purchase.

Through her daughter Catherine, she was the grandmother of John Rutherfurd (1760–1840), a Federalist member of the United States Senate from New Jersey who served from 1791 to 1798. He was married to Helena Magdalena Morris (1762–1840), daughter of Congressman Lewis Morris of Morrisania.

=== Legacy ===
The Alexander Papers at the New-York Historical Society Library contain the records of the mercantile business.
