= Johannes de Peyster Sr. =

Dutch merchant

- Born: c. 1600; Haarlem
- Died: c. 1685; New Amsterdam

Johannes de Peyster Sr. (born in Haarlem, Holland, about 1600; died in New York City about 1685) was a Dutch merchant who immigrated to New Netherland some time before 1651. He was the patriarch of a long line of influential and wealthy family members, who, along with the Van Cortlands, Schuylers, Livingstons, and others, formed New York City’s social and political elite.

== Biography ==
The family name was originally spelled "Peijster," "Peister," or "Pester." De Peyster came of a French Huguenot family that took refuge in the United Provinces about the time of the St. Bartholomew's Day Massacre. He immigrated to New Amsterdam on account of religious persecution. During the brief period in 1673-74 in which the Dutch regained possession of New Netherland, he took a prominent part in the conduct of public affairs, and he was one of the last to take the oath of allegiance to the British Crown on the final cession of the province to that power.

Notwithstanding his tardiness in taking an oath of allegiance, he still remained active in municipal affairs under English rule. At different times, he served as alderman and deputy mayor, but he refused the mayoralty on account of his ignorance of English. At the time of his death, he was one of the wealthiest citizens of the province.

== Family ==
Coat of Arms of Johannes de Peyster

Johannes married Cornelia "Neeltje" Lubberts (aka de Peijster, de Peyster, van Elburch) in 1651 in New York City. Of his sons, Abraham, born when Johannes was 57, became mayor of New York City and Chief Justice of the province; Johannes, born when Johannes, Sr., was 66, also filled the mayor's chair; and Isaac was a member of the provincial legislature.

Johannes senior’s wife Cornelia was the first chamberlain of New York City, besides acting in various other public capacities. His son-in-law David Provost also served as the city's mayor, succeeding his son Johannes.

== Descendants ==
de Peyster family tree
- Johannes de Peyster Sr. (c. 1600–c. 1685)
  - Abraham de Peyster (1657–1728), Mayor of New York City
    - Catherine de Peyster, married Philip Van Cortlandt, son of Stephanus Van Cortlandt
      - Pierre Van Cortlandt (1721–1814)
    - Abraham de Peyster (1696–1767), Treasurer of the Province of New York, married Margaret Van Cortlandt, daughter of Jacobus Van Cortlandt
      - James Abraham de Peyster (1726–1799)
        - Capt. Abraham de Peyster (1753–1798), married Catherine Livingston, granddaughter of Philip Livingston
        - Frederick de Peyster (1758–1834)
          - James Ferguson de Peyster (1794–1874), married (1) Susan Maria Clarkson (1800–1823), daughter of Matthew Clarkson; married (2) Frances Goodhue Ashton (1805–1871)
            - Susan Maria de Peyster (1823–1910), married Robert Edward Livingston (1820–1889)
              - Goodhue Livingston (1867–1951), an architect, married Louisa Robb (1877–1960), daughter of James Hampden Robb
            - Frederic James de Peyster (1839–1905), lawyer, married Augusta McEvers Morris (1851–1911)
          - Frederic de Peyster (1796–1882), lawyer
            - John Watts de Peyster (1821–1907), military officer, married Estelle Livingston
              - John Watts de Peyster Jr. (1841–1873), Union Army officer
              - Johnston de Peyster (1846–1903), New York State Assembly member
    - Pierre Guillaume de Peyster (b. 1707), married Cornelia Schuyler
      - Arent DePeyster (1736–1822), British military officer
      - Pierre Guillaume de Peyster (1745–1807)
        - William Sheriff de Peyster, married Mary Roosevelt, niece of Nicholas Roosevelt
        - Cornelia de Peyster, married Jacob R. Van Rensselaer
  - Johannes de Peyster (1666–1719), Mayor of New York City, married Anna Bancker, sister of Albany mayor Evert Bancker
    - Johannes de Peyster III (1694–1783), married Anna Schuyler, daughter of Albany mayor Myndert Schuyler
      - Anna de Peyster (1723–1794), who married Albany mayor Volkert P. Douw
    - Maria de Peyster, married Gerard Bancker
      - Gerard Bancker (1740–1799), surveyor and politician
    - William de Peyster, married Margaret Roosevelt
      - William de Peyster
        - Elizabeth de Peyster, married Charles Willson Peale (1741–1827), painter
          - Franklin Peale (1795–1870), Philadelphia Mint officer
          - Titian Peale (1799–1885), naturalist
    - Catharina de Peyster, married Hendrick Rutgers (1712–1779)
      - Henry Rutgers (1745–1830), Revolutionary War hero, namesake of Rutgers University
  - Elizabeth de Peyster, married New Jersey provincial Governor John Hamilton
  - Maria de Peyster, married New York City Mayor David Provost

Filmmaker Ken Burns is a descendant.
