= Johannes de Peyster III =

Dutch politician

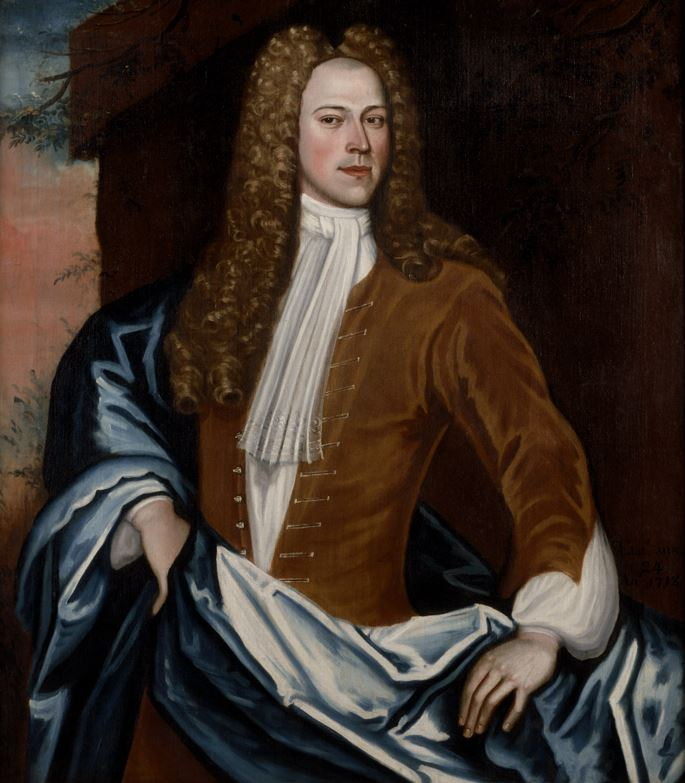
- Portrait de Peyster by Nehemiah Partridge

Mayor of Albany, New York
- In office 1741–1742
- Preceded by: Johannes Schuyler, Jr.
- Succeeded by: Cornelis Cuyler
- In office 1732–1732
- Preceded by: Johannes Hansen
- Succeeded by: Edward Holland
- In office 1729–1731
- Preceded by: Rutger Jansen Bleecker
- Succeeded by: Johannes Hansen

Personal details
- Born: 1694 New York City, New York
- Died: February 27, 1789 (aged 95) Albany, New York, U.S.
- Spouse: Anna Schuyler (m. 1715; died 1750)
- Parent(s): Johannes De Peyster Jr. Anna Bancker
- Relatives: Abraham de Peyster (uncle); Evert Bancker (uncle); David Provost (uncle); Johannes de Peyster, Sr. (grandfather)

Johannes de Peyster or Johannes de Peyster III (1694 – February 27, 1789) was the Mayor of Albany, New York three times between 1729 and 1742.

== Early life ==
De Peyster was born in 1694. He was the son of Johannes De Peyster Jr. and Anna Bancker (1670–1740). His father was the 23rd Mayor of New York City, and served as a captain with the 2nd Battalion, Company of Foot, New York. His parents had 12 children, several who died young. His siblings that survived to adulthood included: Elizabeth de Peyster (1692–1760), who married James Beekman (1687–1730), Cornelia de Peyster (1695–1753), who was married to Matthew Clarkson (1699–1739) and Gilbert Tennent (1703–1764), Gerardus de Peyster (b. 1697), who married Eva van Nuys Ouke, Anna de Peyster (1700–1735), Maria de Peyster (b. 1706), who married Gerard Bancker in 1731, William de Peyster (1709–1784), who married Margareta Roosevelt (1709–1776), daughter of Johannes Roosevelt, and Catharina de Peyster (b. 1711), who married Hendrick Rutgers (1712–1779).

His paternal grandparents were Johannes de Peyster, Sr. and Cornelia Lubberts. His uncle was Abraham de Peyster, who also served as mayor from 1691 to 1694, and his aunt was Maria De Peyster, who was married to David Provost. His maternal grandparents were Gerrit Bancker, a pioneer fur trader, and Elizabeth Van Epps. His uncle was Evert Bancker, the 3rd and 12th Mayor of Albany, New York. His nephews included Gerard Bancker (1740–1799), New York State Treasurer from 1778 to 1798, and Henry Rutgers (1745–1830), namesake of Rutgers College.

== Career ==
From 1717 to the 1740s, he was Lieutenant of Foot County Troops in the militia and Captain of a Troop in 1744.

In 1726, De Peyster became the Recorder of Albany. Shortly thereafter, he served as Mayor of Albany for a total of three times. The first term began in 1729 and he was in office until 1731 when he was succeeded by Johannes "Hans" Hansen, who served from 1831 to 1732. De Peyster succeeded him and was only in office that year, having been succeeded by Edward Holland who served until 1740 when Johannes Schuyler, Jr. became mayor. Schuyler, the son of Mayor Johannes Schuyler and father of Revolutionary War General Philip Schuyler, served from 1740 until 1741 when De Peyster again served. His third and final term ended in 1742 when he was succeeded by Cornelius Cuyler. Cuyler was the son of Mayor Johannes Cuyler, grandson of Mayor Dirck Wesselse Ten Broeck, and father of Mayor Abraham Cuyler.

For eleven years, he served as Commissioner of Indian Affairs for the Province of New York, appointed in 1734, 1738, 1739, and 1746. He was also a member of Provincial Assembly

From 1756 to 1766, he was the Surrogate of Albany County. He held the position again from 1778 to 1782, when the Province became New York State. In 1782, he was replaced in the role by his grandson, John De Peyster Douw. During The Seven Years War, he served as Paymaster of Troops from 1755 to 1756.

== Personal life ==
Coat of Arms of Johannes de Peyster

In 1715, De Peyster married Anna Schuyler (1697–1750), the only child of Albany Mayor Myndert Schuyler (1672–1755) and Rachel Cuyler (1674–1747). Her paternal grandparents were David Pieterse Schuyler (1636–1690), brother of Philip Pieterse Schuyler, and Catharina Verplanck (1639–1690) who both died during the Schenectady massacre of 1690. Together, Johannes de Peyster and his wife Anna had eight children, but only two of the last four born after 1722 survived to adulthood:

- Anna de Peyster (1723–1794), who married Volkert Petrus Douw (1720–1801), a New York State Senator and Mayor of Albany from 1761 to 1770 who was the grandson of Hendrick van Rensselaer.
- Rachel de Peyster (1728–1794), who married Tobias Coenraedt Ten Eyck (1717–1785).
- Myndert Schuyler de Peyster (1736–1745), who died young.

=== Descendants ===
He was the grandfather of nine children born to his daughter Anna, including John De Peyster Douw (1756–1835), who took part in the Clinton-Sullivan Expedition and also served as Surrogate of Albany County, replacing de Peyster in 1782.

Through his daughter Rachel, he was the grandfather of Johannes De Peyster Ten Eyck (d. 1798), Myndert Schuyler Ten Eyck (1753–1805), Henry Ten Eyck (b. 1755), and Tobias Ten Eyck (b. 1764).

Political offices
| Preceded by Johannes Schuyler, Jr. | Mayor of Albany, New York; 1741–1742 | Succeeded by Cornelis Cuyler |
| Preceded by Johannes Hansen | Mayor of Albany, New York; 1732–1732 | Succeeded by Edward Holland |
| Preceded by Rutger Bleecker | Mayor of Albany, New York; 1729–1731 | Succeeded by Johannes Hansen |
