= Isaac De Riemer =

American politician

26th Mayor of New York City
- In office 1700–1701
- Preceded by: David Provost
- Succeeded by: Thomas Noell

Personal details
- Born: January 1675 New York City
- Died: February 23, 1730 (aged 55) New Brunswick, New Jersey
- Profession: Mayor of New York

Isaac De Riemer (born about 1666, died February 23, 1730) was the 26th Mayor of New York City from 1700 to 1701.

== Family ==
The son of Pieter De Riemer and Susanna de Forest (granddaughter of Huguenot settler Jessé de Forest), he was baptized January 10, 1666 in New York City.

== Political career ==
A prominent merchant and politician of Dutch descent, Isaac was appointed Mayor in 1700. He was a descendant of one of the oldest families of the city, and a nephew of the well-known Cornelius Van Steenwyck, the former mayor.

He was also elected as Assistant Alderman of the West Ward in 1696, elevated to Alderman and Sheriff of the same ward and Treasurer of the city in 1699. He became a member of the Colonial Assembly in 1700. From 1702 to 1704, he was again Alderman of the West Ward, in addition to the Collector of the South Ward in 1706. In 1708, he was elected Constable, before finally becoming Alderman of the Out Ward from 1714 to 1717.

== Military career ==
Prior to his political career, he was in the military, rising to the level of Captain. He is also known for giving an affidavit of his account of Leisler's Rebellion on February 24, 1691.

== Legacy ==
De Reimer Avenue in The Bronx is named after him.
