= Walter Tuckerman =

American banker (1881-1961)

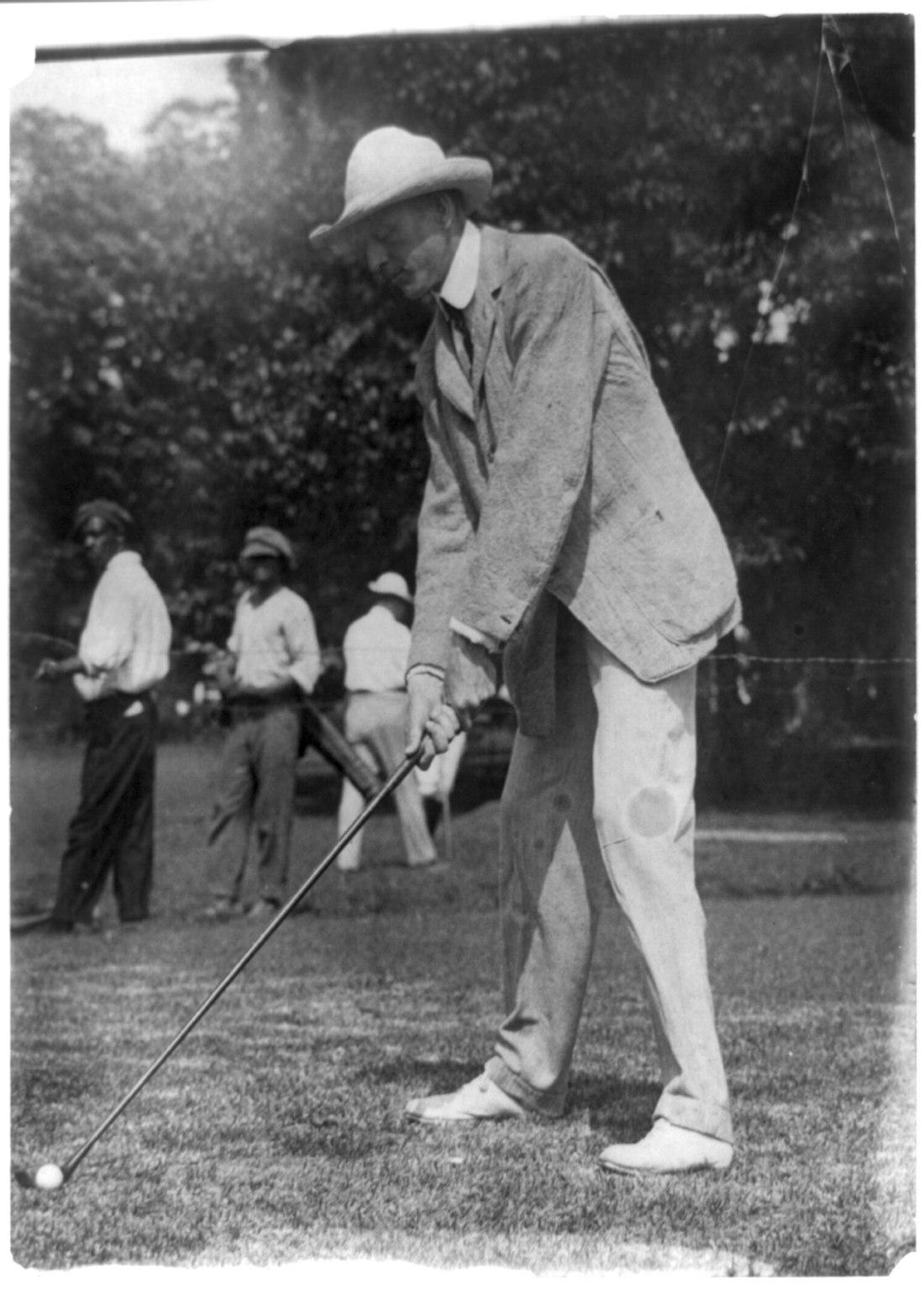
- Born: Walter Rupert Tuckerman; November 23, 1881; Oyster Bay, New York, U.S.
- Died: November 23, 1961 (aged 80); Washington, D.C,, U.S.
- Education: Morristown School
- Alma mater: Harvard University; George Washington University Law School
- Known for: Founder of Bank of Bethesda
- Spouse: Edith Abercrombie-Miller (m. 1910; died 1954)
- Children: 5
- Parent(s): Walter Cary Tuckerman; Florence Harding Fenno

Walter Rupert Tuckerman (November 23, 1881 – January 15, 1961) was an American lawyer, banker, golfer, and philanthropist. Tuckerman was the founder of the Edgemoor neighborhood (1912) and The Edgemoor Club (1920) in Bethesda, Maryland. was a founder and the first president of the Bank of Bethesda (1919); was a founder of the Burning Tree Club in Bethesda (1922); and was the founder and first president of the Bethesda Chamber of Commerce (1926. Tuckerman was a direct descendant of Oliver Wolcott, a signer of the United States Declaration of Independence. He was also a cousin of horse rider Bayard Tuckerman Jr., an inductee into the National Racing Hall of Fame.

== Early life and education ==
Tuckerman was the youngest of four boys born to Walter Cary Tuckerman (1849–1894) and Florence Harding (née Fenno) Tuckerman (1848–1887) in Oyster Bay, New York, on November 23, 1881. After becoming orphaned, he moved to Washington, D.C. to live with Elizabeth Wolcott Gibbs Tuckerman, a wealthy grandmother. In 1899, Tuckerman graduated from Morristown School (now Morristown-Beard School) in Morristown, New Jersey. He later served as a member of the school's Board of Trustees and as president of its alumni association. The award for scholarship in Greek at Morristown School (the Walter R. Tuckerman Greek Prize) bore his name.

In 1903, Tuckerman received his bachelor's degree from Harvard University in Cambridge, Massachusetts. He then completed his law degree at George Washington University in Washington, D.C. in 1907. Tuckerman later served on the school's Board of Trustees. In 1952, George Washington University awarded him an honorary doctorate of laws.

== Career ==
Seeking a career, Tuckerman traveled to the Western United States to work as a prospector, rancher, and sheep herder in California and Nevada. While out west, he also joined the Alaskan Boundary Survey Commission in 1909. Recognizing his work with the commission, a peak along the Canada/Alaska boundary bears the name Mount Tuck. Returning to the Eastern U.S., Tuckerman began his law practice. He also took on the role of president of the Union Savings Bank, and then served as a member of the Board of Directors of the National Metropolitan Bank.

=== Development of Edgemoor in Bethesda ===
In 1912, Tuckerman purchased the Watkins dairy farm in Maryland owned by Otis Watkins. Laying out a subdivision of land on a plot of 183 acres, Tuckerman named the area Edgewood, Maryland. Confusion between his Edgewood and the federal arsenal in Baltimore, Maryland, meant that mail often mistakenly went to the later rather than Edgewood, Maryland. To clear up this issue Tuckerman renamed Edgewood, Maryland to Edgemoor, Maryland. He took the moor ending from a road named Moorland Lane.

Tuckerman developed a tennis and swimming club for Edgemoor called the Edgemoor Club. He later helped organize Bethesda's volunteer fire department and public library, and he contributed tracts of land to construct their buildings. Tuckerman Lane, a major street that runs through Bethesda and Rockville, Maryland, bears his name. The road connected Old Georgetown Road to Black Oak Thicket, a 318-acre plot of land owned by Tuckerman.

In 1929, Tuckerman's estate housed five U.S. Senators during legislative work on the Smoot-Hawley Tariff Act of 1930. The group included Hiram Bingham III, Walter Evans Edge, George H. Moses, David A. Reed, and Frederic C. Walcott. Four of them served on the Finance Committee, which developed the bill for the act in the U.S. Senate.

=== Amateur golf and stewardship of the sport ===
Tuckerman began playing golf during his teenage years. In 1907, he won the Mid-Atlantic Amateur Golf Championship played at the Baltimore Country Club in Baltimore, Maryland. Three years later, Tuckerman won the 1910 Mid-Winter Tournament and the Spring Tournament at Pinehurst Resort in Pinehurst, North Carolina. He also finished runner-up at the North and South Men's Amateur Golf Championship at Pinehurst. Tuckerman was a member of The Tin Whistles.

In 1911, Tuckerman won the Shinnecock Hills Tournament at the Shinnecock Hills Golf Club in Southampton, New York, on Long Island. He later captured the Washington Metropolitan Amateur Championship in 1914 and 1923 when Chevy Chase Country Club hosted the tournament in Chevy Chase, Maryland. During his golf career, Tuckerman captured the Stockbridge Cup of the Berkshire Golf Tournament in Stockbridge, Massachusetts. He also played in the U.S. Senior Golf Association Tournament and the seniors international triangular matches.

Tuckerman helped lay out the golf course at Congressional Country Club, now a club on the PGA Tour. In 1922, he co-founded Burning Tree Club, and he served as a founding member of its board of directors. Tuckerman also donated 30 acres to help construct the club. According to the Maryland Inventory of Historic Properties, he stated that the club name symbolized trees with fiery colors characteristic of the area. Tuckerman said, "They called it Potomac, the Place of the Burning Tree".

During his golf career, Tuckerman served as president of the Middle Atlantic Golf Association and then as vice president of the U.S. Senior Golf Association. In 1958, the Mid-Atlantic Golf Association honored his service and that of Scottish-American golfer Frederick Robertson McLeod. They paid tribute to 101 combined years of service of both men during the 58th annual meeting of the association at Columbia Country Club in Chevy Chase, Maryland.

=== Philanthropy and social service ===
Tuckerman served as a member of the Board of Trustees of the Church Orphanage Association of St. John's and as its corporate secretary. He served as Secretary of the Finance Committee of the American Red Cross's Washington, D.C. Chapter and chaired the Board of Trustees of the American Red Cross's Bethesda Chapter. Tuckerman also chaired the Board of Trustees of the Social Services League's Bethesda Branch.

== Personal life ==
On December 28, 1910, Walter Tuckerman married Edith Abercrombie-Miller (1883-1954), daughter of James Abercrombie-Miller, at Grace Episcopal Church in Madison, New Jersey. (Note: Edith's sister, Alice Abercrombie-Miller (1885–1965), was first married to Frederic Ashton de Peyster (1875–1951), the son of Frederic James De Peyster. They divorced in 1934 and she remarried to Count Bohdan K. de Castellane, a member of the Polish branch of the de Castellane family of Europe.) They had five daughters together:

- Laura Wolcott Tuckerman (1911–2012), who married Willard Gustav Triest (1905–1989), an engineer and designer.
- Edith Elizabeth Tuckerman (1913–1998), who married Benjamin Hodges Biay. She was a patron of the arts. She made donations to the Smithsonian Institution, including Genoese velvet and an embroidered waistcoat from King Louis XVI of France. (Note: The Archives of American Art at the Institute contains letters sent to her from artists Louise Kidder Sparrow, Elizabeth Paterson, and Harry Wells. In 1929, Edith Tuckerman co-founded the National Women's Country Club (now Bethesda Country Club) as a re-organization of Montgomery Country Club. The club included a nine-hole course designed by Scottish architect Fred Findlay. During Edith Tuckerman I's service as the club's president, it hosted First Lady Edith Wilson as the guest of honor at a luncheon. (Wilson was the wife of President Woodrow Wilson.))
- Ruth Hollingsworth Tuckerman, who married Robert Gifford Metter (1912–1984) in 1942.
- Alice Noel Tuckerman (1918–2015), who married Brigadier General Robert H. Williams (d. 1983) in 1939.
- Margaret Cary Tuckerman (1922–1983), who married Rear Admiral Draper Laurence Kauffman (1911–1979), son of Vice Admiral James Laurence Kauffman.

Tuckerman died on January 15, 1961, in Bethesda, Maryland.
