= James Alexander (lawyer) =

American lawyer in colonial New York

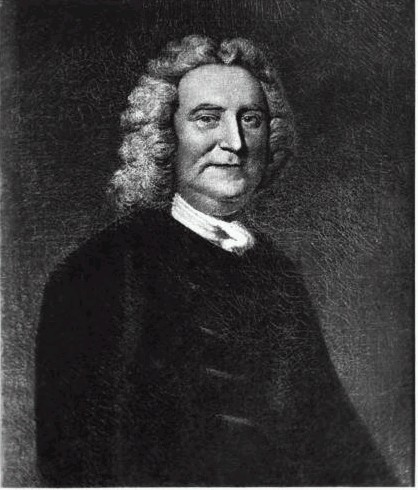

4th New Jersey Attorney General
- In office 1723–1728
- Governor: William Burnet
- Preceded by: Jeremiah Basse
- Succeeded by: Lawrence Smyth

Member of the New Jersey Provincial Council for the Eastern Division
- In office 1722 – April 2, 1756
- Preceded by: Thomas Gordon
- Succeeded by: William Alexander, Lord Stirling

Personal details
- Born: May 27, 1691 Muthill, Perthshire, Scotland
- Died: April 2, 1756 (aged 64) New York, British America
- Spouse: Mary Spratt Provoost (m. 1721)
- Relations: John Stevens III (grandson); John Rutherfurd (grandson)
- Children: 7, including William
- Parent: David Alexander
- Education: High School of Stirling
- Occupation: Lawyer

James Alexander (May 27, 1691 – April 2, 1756) was a Scottish-born lawyer and politician in colonial New York. He served in the Colonial Assembly and as attorney general of the colony in 1721–23. His son William was later a major general in the Continental Army during the American revolution. Alexandria Township, New Jersey, was named after James Alexander.

== Early life ==
Alexander was born in Muthill in Perthshire, Scotland on May 27, 1691, to David Alexander ("of Muthil"). He was a distant relation of the Earl of Stirling and may have received his formal education at the High School of Stirling.

He joined the navy, serving on HMS Arundell in 1712–13, where he learned navigation, mathematics, and astronomy. But in 1714–15, he joined the uprising in support of James Francis Edward Stuart, the Old Pretender, and fled to America in 1715 when it failed.

== Life in America ==
In November 1715, he was appointed surveyor general of New Jersey. He personally made surveys, using instruments he had brought from Scotland and resolved disputed titles. Alexander settled in New York, married, and in January 1721 was appointed deputy-secretary of New York.

=== Legal career ===
Alexander read law in New York and was admitted to the provincial bar of New Jersey in 1720. He served as attorney general for the colony of New York from 1721 to 1723. Alexander sought membership of Gray's Inn on February 1, 1725, and returned from London with a large legal library that enabled him to cite legal precedent in court. This was a distinct advantage for a colonial lawyer. James Duane, ward and later son-in-law of Robert Livingston, third Lord of Livingston Manor, read law as a clerk in Alexander's office and became proficient in the area of rights and jurisdiction in land disputes. Alexander practiced law, engaged in mercantile pursuits, and built a considerable fortune.

He built a large brick mansion at Broad and Beaver Streets. Alexander owned six slaves over the course of his life, all of whom worked as domestic servants in his Broad Street mansion. One of his slaves escaped from bondage by forging a transit pass.

=== Family landholdings ===
William Alexander, 1st Earl of Stirling also known as Sir William Alexander was James Alexander's ancestor. In 1621 King James I granted Stirling a royal charter appointing him mayor of a vast territory which was enlarged into a lordship and barony of Nova Scotia (meaning New Scotland); the area is now known as Nova Scotia, New Brunswick, and parts of the northern United States. On 22 April 1636, King Charles told the Plymouth Colony, which had laid claim to Long Island but had not settled it, to give the island to Alexander. In October 1641 the first Earl of Stirling deeded the island of Nantucket to Thomas Mayhew of Watertown, Massachusetts.

James Alexander never laid claim to the title Earl of Stirling. He fled Britain as a young man, after his role in a failed Jacobite plot to put James "the Old Pretender" on the British throne. Through his own industry he acquired what became Island Beach State Park in New Jersey and later lost it. His son William Alexander, Lord Stirling, unofficially known as Lord Stirling during his life and a Patriot general during the Revolutionary War, legally sought ownership of the property in 1761 and won the rights to what became Stirling Island. James Alexander also owned large tracts of land in today's Basking Ridge area of New Jersey, which he later willed to his son.

=== Politics ===
In 1721, Alexander was appointed to the Governor's Council in New York. In 1723, he was added to the Council in New Jersey and that same year made Attorney General of New Jersey. He frequently opposed the policies of New York Governor William Cosby and in 1732, Cosby succeeded in having Alexander removed from the council. In 1733, Alexander started an anti-Cosby newspaper, the New York Weekly Journal, with Peter Zenger as publisher. Alexander was the principal author of pieces critical of Governor Cosby. The following year, Zenger was arrested on sedition charges, but eventually a jury acquitted Zenger of libel in one of the first instances of jury nullification. Alexander and William Smith served as Zenger's attorneys until both were disbarred after they challenged the commissions of the judges hearing the case.

In 1730, Alexander was chairman of the committee to revise the New York City charter; he was given the freedom of the city the following year. When Lord De La Warr was appointed governor in 1737, Alexander was reinstated to the bar and reappointed to the governor's Council of New York. His removal from the Council of New Jersey was disregarded. Alexander became a vocal proponent of the emerging Whig political views, and engaged in various civic efforts as well. In 1751, he raised funds to establish King's College.

=== Later life ===
Although he remained active in politics, his legal practice, acquired holdings, and other interests eventually absorbed most of his time and energy, and his political involvement waned. He was an founding member of the American Philosophical Society, established in 1743 by Benjamin Franklin and others, including Francis Hopkinson, John Bartram, Philip Syng, Jr.

== Personal life ==
Coat of Arms of James Alexander

On June 5, 1721, Alexander married the wealthy widow Mary Spratt Provoost (1693–1760). She was the daughter of John Spratt (c. 1650–1697) and Maria de Peyster (1659–1700). Her DePuyster uncles drafted the prenuptial agreements. Mary was the widow of Samuel Provoost (d. 1719), the younger brother of David Proovost, the 24th mayor of New York City, with whom she had three children. Together, James and Mary had seven children:

- Mary Alexander II (1721–1767), who married Peter Van Brugh Livingston (1710–1792), the son of Philip Livingston and brother of Governor William Livingston, in 1739.
- James Alexander (1723–1731), who died young.
- William Alexander (1725–1783), who married Sarah Livingston (1725–1805), a daughter of Philip Livingston, in 1748.
- Elizabeth Alexander (1726–1800), who married John Stevens (1715–1792), the Vice President of the New Jersey Legislative Council.
- Catherine Alexander (1727–1801), who married Walter Rutherfurd (1723–1804), who was born in Edgerston, Scotland, in 1758.
- Anna Alexander (1731–1736), who died young.
- Susannah Alexander (1737–1777), who married John Reid (1721–1807), a British army General and founder of the chair of music at the University of Edinburgh.

In 1756, while on a trip to Albany to confer with other Whig leaders, he suffered a flare up of his gout which led to a deterioration of his health. He returned home ill as a result and died in Albany or New York City on April 2, 1756.

=== Descendants ===
Through his daughter Mary, he was the grandfather of 12 grandchildren, including Philip Peter Livingston (1740–1810).

Through his son William, he was the grandfather of three, William Alexander, Mary Alexander, who married a wealthy merchant named Robert Watts of New York, and Catherine Alexander, who married Congressman William Duer (1747–1799).

Through his daughter Elizabeth, he was the grandfather of John Stevens III (1749–1838), a lawyer, engineer, and inventor who constructed the first U.S. steam locomotive and first steam-powered ferry, and Mary Stevens (d. 1814), who married Chancellor Robert Livingston, negotiator of the Louisiana Purchase.

Through his daughter Catherine, he was the grandfather of John Rutherfurd (1760–1840), a Federalist member of the United States Senate from New Jersey who served from 1791 to 1798, who married Helena Magdalena Morris (1762–1840), daughter of Congressman Lewis Morris of Morrisania.

== See also ==
- John Peter Zenger
- Jury nullification in the United States
- Liberty Boys

== Sources ==
- Alexander, James and William Papers, 1711–1909. The New Jersey Historical Society.
- "James Alexander." in American Eras, Volume 2: The Colonial Era, 1600–1754. Gale Research, 1998. Reproduced in Biography Resource Center. Farmington Hills, Mich.: Gale, 2008. Document Number: K2438000001. Online. March 25, 2008.
- Burrows, E. G.; Wellace, M. (1998). "Chapter 11: Recession, Revival, and Rebellion". Gotham: A History of New York City to 1898. Oxford University Press. ISBN 978-0-19-511634-2.
- Rose, George."James Alexander."Dictionary of American Biography Base Set. American Council of Learned Societies, 1928–1936.
- The Trial of John Peter Zenger
