= Thomas Noell =

Politician

27th Mayor of New York City
- In office 1701–1702
- Preceded by: Isaac De Riemer
- Succeeded by: Phillip French

Personal details
- Born: England
- Died: 1702 Bergen, New Jersey

Thomas Noell (died 1702) was the 27th Mayor of New York City, who served from 1701 to 1702. He was an English-born merchant from an aristocratic family who became a citizen of New York in 1698. He was appointed mayor on September 29, 1701, and took the oath of office on October 14 of that year. He died in 1702 at his farm in Bergen, New Jersey (Modern-day Jersey City) of smallpox.

== See also ==
- List of mayors of New York City
