= Abraham de Peyster (treasurer) =

Dutch-American treasurer of the Province of New York

Abraham de Peyster (August 26, 1696 – September 17, 1767), was a Dutch-American who served as the treasurer of the Province of New York.

== Early life ==
De Peyster was born on August 26, 1696, in New York City. He was the eldest son of Abraham de Peyster (1657–1728) and Catharina de Peyster (1665–c. 1734), who were second cousins. Among his siblings were Catherine de Peyster (who married Philip Van Cortlandt, son of Stephanus Van Cortlandt), Elizabeth de Peyster (who married John Hamilton, the Governor of New Jersey), and Pierre Guillaume de Peyster (who married Cornelia Schuyler). His father served as the 20th mayor of New York City from 1691 to 1694.

His maternal grandparents were Pierre de Peyster and Gertrude (née van Dyke) de Peyster. His paternal grandparents were Johannes de Peyster Sr. and Cornelia (née Lubberts) de Peyster. His uncle was Johannes de Peyster and his aunt was Maria de Peyster (the wife of David Provost).

== Career ==
De Peyster was a prominent New York City merchant and succeeded his father in the office of provincial treasurer of New York.

== Personal life ==
On July 1, 1722, de Peyster married Margaret Van Cortlandt at the New York Dutch Church. Margaret was a daughter of Jacobus Van Cortlandt. Together, they were the parents of:

- Catherine de Peyster (1724–1804), who married John Livingston, a younger son of Philip Livingston, 2nd Lord of Livingston Manor.
- James de Peyster (1726–1799), who married Sarah Reade, a daughter of Joseph Reade and Anna (née French) Reade (a daughter of Phillip French).
- Margareta de Peyster (1728–1780), who married William Axtell, a member of the King's Council.
- Frederic de Peyster (1731–1773)
- Mary de Peyster (b. 1735), who married Dr. John Charlton.
- Elizabeth de Peyster (1737–1775), who married Matthew Clarkson, son of Assemblyman David Clarkson and uncle to Matthew Clarkson.

De Peyster died on September 17, 1767, in New York City.

=== Descendants ===
Through his son James, he was a grandfather to Abraham de Peyster, who briefly led the Loyalists in the Battle of Kings Mountain. Evacuating to British North America after the American Revolution, the younger Abraham became the Treasurer of the new royal colony of New Brunswick.
