= Peter Van Brugh Livingston =

American patriot (1710–1792)

New York State Treasurer
- In office 1776–1778
- Preceded by: Office created
- Succeeded by: Gerard Bancker

Personal details
- Born: November 3, 1710 Albany, New York, British America
- Died: December 28, 1792 (aged 82) Elizabethtown, New Jersey, U.S.
- Spouses: Mary Alexander (m. 1739; died 1767) Elizabeth Ricketts (m. 1771)
- Children: 12
- Parent(s): Philip Livingston; Catharine Van Brugh
- Relatives: See Livingston family
- Education: Yale College

Peter Van Brugh Livingston (bp. November 3, 1710 Albany, New York – December 28, 1792 Elizabethtown, Union County, New Jersey) was a Patriot during the American Revolution who was a wealthy merchant and who served as the 1st New York State Treasurer from 1776 to 1778.

== Early life ==
Peter Van Brugh Livingston was the second surviving son of Philip Livingston (1686–1749), the 2nd Lord of Livingston Manor, and Catharine Van Brugh (b. 1689). His older brother was Robert Livingston (1708–1790) and his younger brothers included Philip Livingston (1716–1778), a signer of the United States Declaration of Independence, and William Livingston (1723–1790), a signer of the United States Constitution and the 1st Governor of New Jersey. Livingston graduated from Yale College in 1731, and settled in New York City.

Livingston's mother was the only child of his namesake, Pieter Van Brugh (1666–1740), the Mayor of Albany, New York from 1699 to 1700 and from 1721 to 1723. His grandfather's sister, Catharina Van Brugh, married Hendrick van Rensselaer, the son of Jeremias van Rensselaer, patroon of Rensselaerswyck. Livingston's maternal great-grandfather, Johannes Pieterse van Brugh (1624–1697), was one of the early settlers of New Netherland and was prominently connected with the Dutch West India Company.

His paternal grandparents were Alida Schuyler (1656–1727) and Robert Livingston the Elder (1654–1728), and his uncle was Robert Livingston (1688–1775) of Clermont.

== Career ==
After his graduation from Yale, he became engaged in the shipping business with William Alexander, Lord Stirling. He was also engaged in the slave trade with his father. Livingston's mercantile interests involved activities in the West Indies, North Carolina, and Fort Niagara, where he was involved in the fur trade.

In 1748, he helped found the College of New Jersey (now Princeton University) and became one of its original trustees, serving until 1761. In 1755, he furnished the supplies for the expedition of Governor William Shirley to Acadia.

In 1775, he was a member of the Committee of One Hundred. He was a delegate to the New York Provincial Congresses, and was President from May 1775 to August 1775 and from September 1776 to March 1777. He was also Chairman of the Committee of Safety from September 1776 to March 1777. In 1776, he was appointed Treasurer by the Provincial Congress, and remained in office until 1778, after the establishment of the State Government.

== Personal life ==
His home in New York City was a large mansion on the east side of what is now Hanover Square, with grounds extending to the East River. Later he removed to Elizabethtown, N.J., and died there at the Liberty Hall.

On November 3, 1739, Peter Van Brugh Livingston married Mary Alexander (1721–1767), the daughter of James Alexander and Mary Spratt Provoost, and the sister of his business associate, Lord Stirling. Before her death in 1767, they had twelve children, including:

- Philip Peter Livingston (1740–1810), who was known as "Gentleman Phil," and who married Cornelia Van Horne (b. 1759).
- Mary Livingston (1742), who died in infancy.
- Catherine Livingston (1743–1775), who married Nicholas Bayard.
- James Alexander Livingston (b. 1744).
- Mary Livingston (1746–1780), who married Capt. John Brown.
- Peter Livingston (b. 1753), who married Susan Blondel.
- Sarah Livingston (1755–1825), who married Capt. James Ricketts.
- William Alexander Livingston (1757–1780), who was killed in a duel.
- Susan Livingston (1759–1853), who married (1) John Kean in 1789; (2) Count Julian Niemcewicz in 1800, aide to Kosciuzko.
- Elizabeth Livingston (1761–1787), who married French consul Louis-Guillaume Otto.
- James Alexander Livingston (b. 1763), who died young.
- Ann Livingston (b. 1767), who died young.

On April 9, 1771, he married Elizabeth Ricketts, the widow of William Ricketts, in Elizabethtown, New Jersey.

=== Descendants and honors ===
Through his eldest son Philip, he was the grandfather of Van Brugh Livingston (1792–1868), who served as the American Chargé d'affaires (i.e. equivalent of the current U.S. Ambassador) to Ecuador from August 12, 1848 until November 12, 1849, appointed by President James K. Polk.

Livingston's daughter Susan Niemcewicz established a scholarship at the College of New Jersey, named in honor of her father.

== See also ==
- Livingston family

Political offices
Preceded by Office created	New York State Treasurer; 1776–1778	Succeeded by Gerard Bancker
