= Henry Rutgers =

American politician (1745–1830)

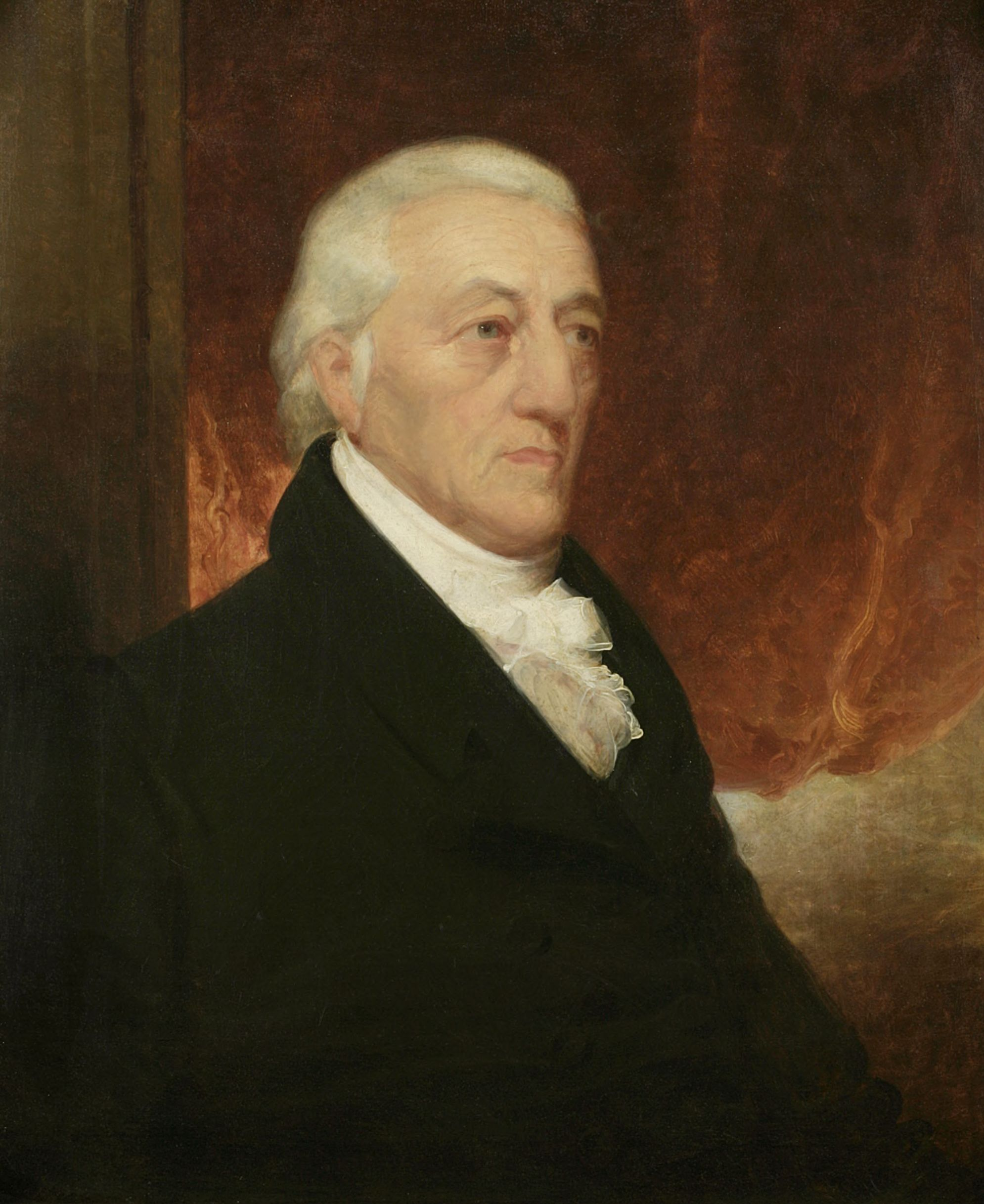
- Portrait by Henry Inman, 1828

Member of the New York State Assembly from New York County
- In office July 1, 1783 – June 30, 1784

Personal details
- Born: October 7, 1745 New York City, Province of New York, British America
- Died: February 17, 1830 (aged 84) New York City, New York, U.S.
- Parent(s): Hendrick Rutgers; Catharine DePeyster
- Relatives: Johannes de Peyster Sr. (great-grandfather); Johannes de Peyster (maternal grandfather); Abraham de Peyster (granduncle); Evert Bancker (granduncle); Johannes de Peyster III (maternal uncle); Samuel Provoost (cousin); Theodore Roosevelt (third cousin twice removed); Franklin Delano Roosevelt (third cousin twice removed)
- Education: Columbia University (BA)
- Occupation: Revolutionary War hero, philanthropist
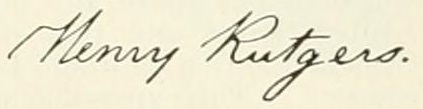
- Signature

Henry Rutgers (October 7, 1745 – February 17, 1830) was an American philanthropist, businessman, legislator, and Revolutionary War veteran from New York City. Most notably the namesake of Rutgers University, the college was named in his honor following his donation of a $5,000 bond (roughly $142,000 today) and a $200 bronze bell which is still in use.

== Early life ==
Rutgers was born in New York City, in the Province of New York which was then a part of British America. He was the son of New Netherland colonists Hendrick Rutgers and Catharine (née DePeyster) Rutgers.

His maternal grandparents were Johannes de Peyster, the 23rd Mayor of New York City, and Anna (née Bancker) de Peyster, the sister of Evert Bancker, the 3rd and 12th Mayor of Albany, New York. His paternal grandparents were Harmanus Rutgers and Rachel (née Meyers) Rutgers, herself a granddaughter of Claes Martenszen van Rosenvelt, the first Roosevelt to arrive in America. Through his father's sister, he was a first cousin of Samuel Provoost, the first Bishop of the Episcopal Diocese of New York. He was a third cousin twice removed of both U.S. Presidents Theodore Roosevelt and Franklin Delano Roosevelt.

In 1728 Harmanus Rutgers, Jr. purchased a farm near present-day East Broadway and Oliver Streets. Rutgers was a brewer and had a barn on Catherine Street to store the barley he grew. A lane that would later become Cherry Street ran along the southern border. His son Hendrick inherited the property and in 1754 built a new farmhouse farther to the north and nearer the East River. The Rutgers extended their holdings, purchasing water lots. Fill was added to the water on either side at the ends of the larger streets that ran perpendicular to the shore, forming slips or inlets where small boats could dock.

== Career ==
Rutgers graduated from King's College (now Columbia University) in 1766. Following his graduation, he promptly became an advocate for independence of the American colonies from Great Britain. He went on to serve as a captain of American forces at the Battle of White Plains, and later as a colonel for the New York militia. During the British occupation of New York, Rutgers withdrew to Albany. During his absence, the British used the family home as an army hospital.

Rutgers continued to play a role in the defense of the young nation after the Revolution, presiding over a meeting held June 24, 1812, to organize American forces in New York in anticipation of a British attack in the ensuing War of 1812.

=== Politics and public life ===
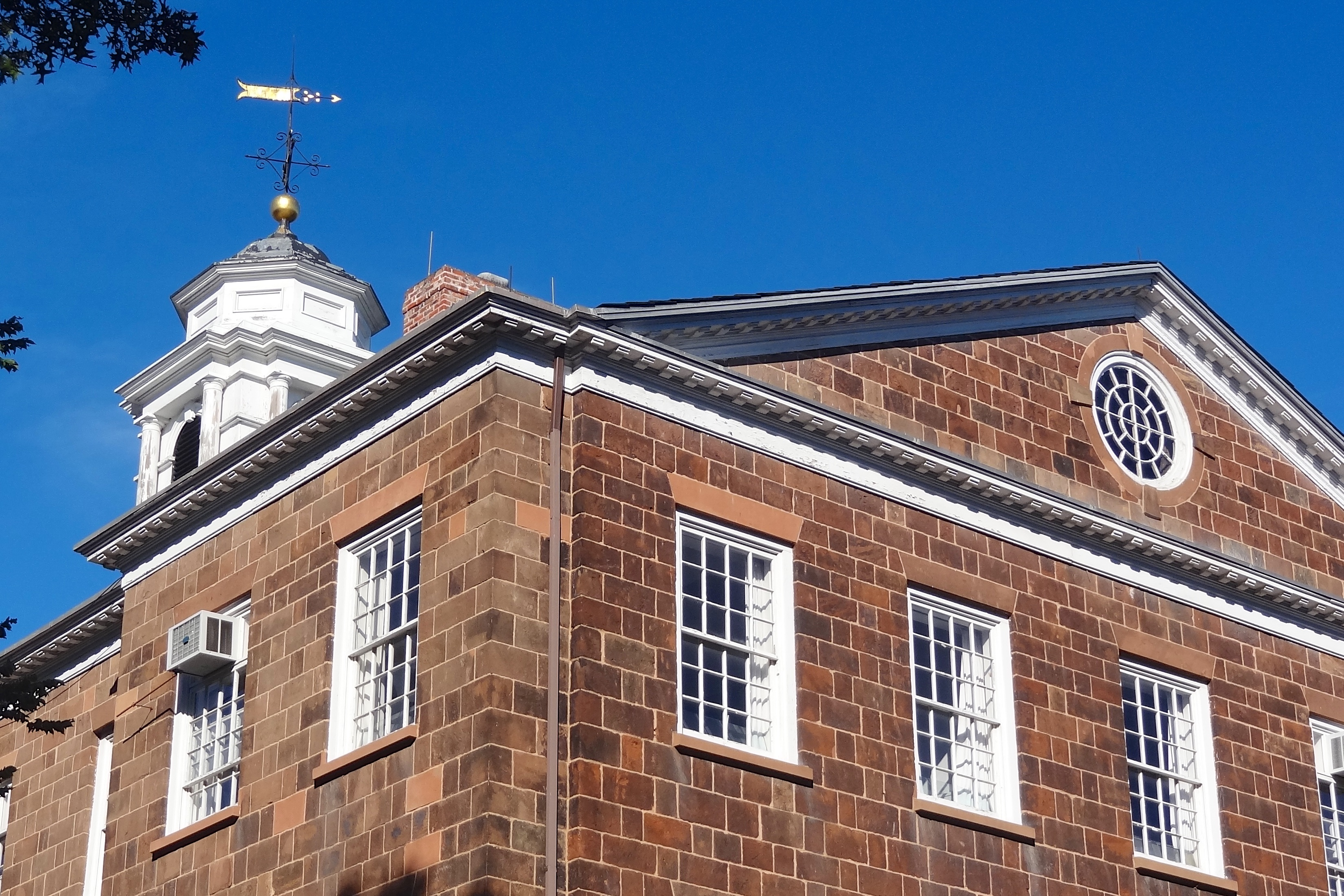
The bronze bell donated by Henry Rutgers hangs in the cupola of Old Queens

In 1783, Rutgers was elected to the New York State Assembly, where he served in the 7th New York State Legislature. He also served on the New York Board of Education Regents from 1802 to 1826. He was a presidential elector, chosen by the legislature, in 1808, 1816, and 1820.

Rutgers supported the American Colonization Society, arguing against abolitionists that free people of color should be removed from the United States rather than allowed to grow as a population. He was himself a slaveowner, like many of his relatives.

Rutgers continued to expand his holdings, extending his water lots further out into the river. In his later years, Rutgers, a bachelor, devoted much of his fortune to philanthropy. As a landowner with considerable holdings on the island of Manhattan (especially in the vicinity of Chatham Square), he donated land for the use of schools, churches, and charities in the area. Both Henry Street and Rutgers Street in lower Manhattan are named for him, as well as the Rutgers Presbyterian Church (formerly the Collegiate Presbyterian Church) which was also named for Rutgers who donated the parcel of land at the corner of Henry Street and Rutgers Street on which the original church was built in 1798.

In 1807, he helped purchase the site of what became Spring Street Presbyterian Church.

Rutgers' most lasting legacy, however, is due to his donations to Queen's College in New Brunswick, New Jersey, which at the time was suffering considerable financial difficulties and temporarily closed. The college had been founded as a seminary for the Reformed Church in America and appealed to Rutgers, a devout member of the church with a reputation for philanthropy, for aid. Rutgers donated a bond valued at $5000 to reopen the faltering school, and subsequently donated a bronze bell that was hung in the cupola of the Old Queens building which housed the college. In gratitude, and hoping the college would be remembered in Rutgers' will, the trustees renamed it Rutgers College on December 5, 1825. (Rutgers left nothing to the college upon his death.) The institution, after a series of expansions and mergers with other colleges, later became Rutgers University, then Rutgers, The State University of New Jersey. However, the original college named for him no longer exists, being subsumed by the university's School of Arts and Sciences in 2007.

== Death and legacy ==
Coat of Arms of Henry Rutgers

Rutgers died in 1830 in New York City, at the age of 84. His body was initially buried in the Reformed Church on Nassau Street (the same church in which he was baptized) in Manhattan. However, as cemeteries in Manhattan were redeveloped during the mid-1800s, Rutgers' body was re-interred several times (first moved in 1858 to the Middle Church in Lafayette Place, on the corner of Nassau Street and Cedar Street in Manhattan, and then, in 1865, interred in Green-Wood Cemetery). For many years, no one remembered where his body had been finally buried, although it was long believed that he was buried in a Dutch Reformed churchyard in Belleville, New Jersey. One road running alongside this New Jersey graveyard is now called Rutgers Street (signed as, but not technically part of, Route 7).

Misplaced by history for over 140 years, Rutgers' final grave was rediscovered in October 2007 by Civil War research volunteers sifting through burial records of the historical Green-Wood Cemetery. In 1865, Rutgers' body had been finally buried in an unmarked grave (he is interred in Lot 10776, Sec. 28, in an underground vault) within the Dutch Reformed Church's plot at Green-Wood Cemetery in Brooklyn.

The Green-Wood Historic Fund and members of the Rutgers Community honored Rutgers' memory on Flag Day, June 14, 2008, by unveiling a bronze marker at his gravesite. Elsewhere in Green-Wood Cemetery lies the grave of Mabel Smith Douglass, founder and first dean of the New Jersey College for Women (renamed Douglass College in her honor). Douglass College is part of Rutgers University's New Brunswick campus.
