= Frederic de Peyster =

American lawyer (1796–1882)

Frederic de Peyster II
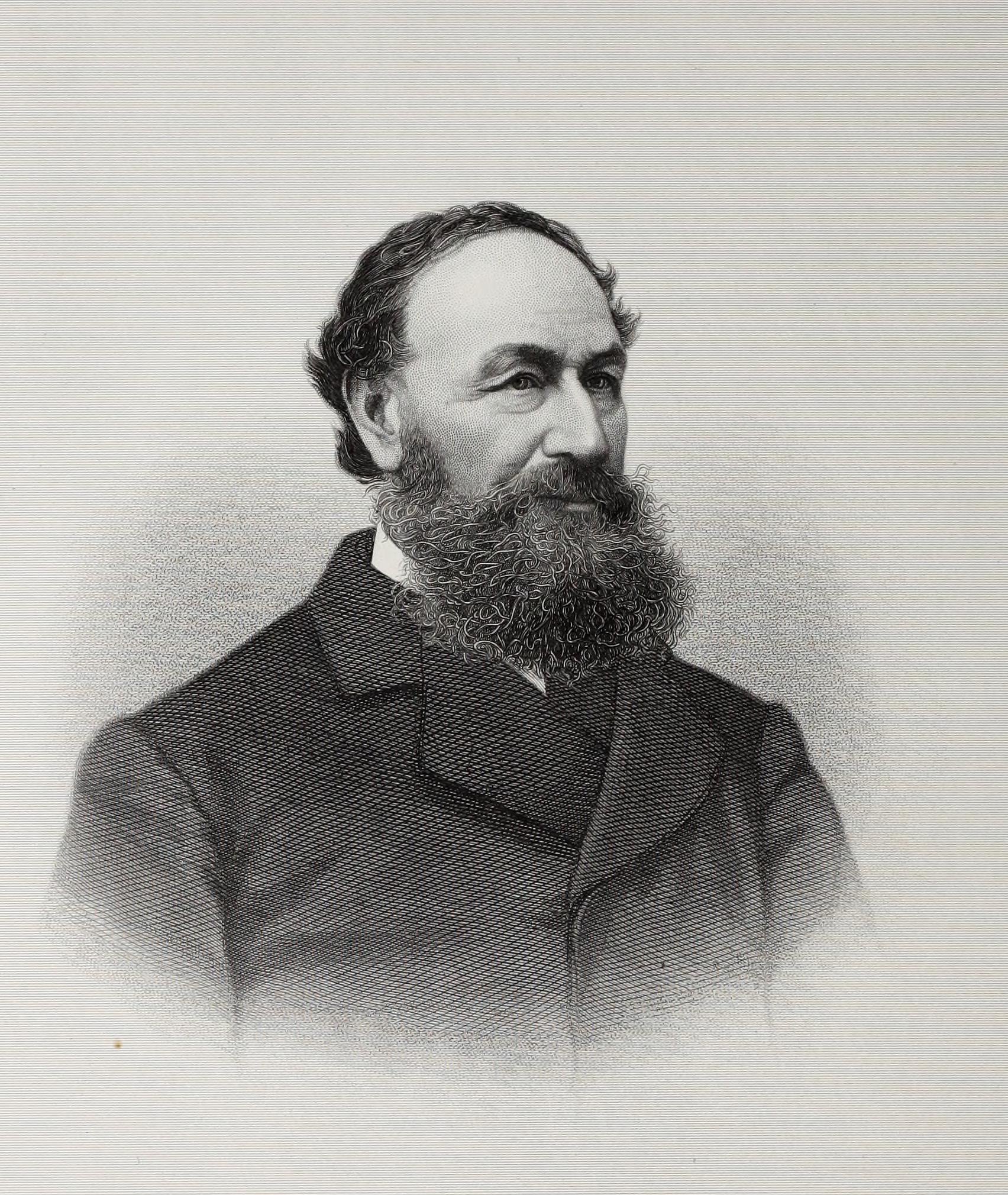

9th President of the Saint Nicholas Society of the City of New York
- In office 1854–1855
- Preceded by: Ogden Hoffman
- Succeeded by: James de Peyster Ogden

Personal details
- Born: November 11, 1796 New York City, US
- Died: August 17, 1882 (aged 85) Tivoli, New York, US
- Spouses: Mary Justina Watts (m. 1820; died 1821) Maria Antoinette Kane Hone (m. 1839; died 1869)
- Relations: John Watts de Peyster Jr. (grandson); Johnston de Peyster (grandson)
- Children: John Watts de Peyster
- Parent(s): Frederic de Peyster; Helen Livingston Hake
- Education: Columbia College

Frederic de Peyster II (November 11, 1796, in New York City – August 17, 1882, in Tivoli, New York) was a New York City lawyer and member of the De Peyster family.

== Early life ==
De Peyster was born in Hanover Square in New York City on November 11, 1796. He was the third son of Helen Livingston (née Hake) de Peyster (1773–1801) and Frederick de Peyster (1758–1834), who fought for the British crown in the Nassau Blues Battalion, King's American Regiment during the American Revolution. After the war, his father emigrated to Saint John, New Brunswick, but later returned to the United States. Among his siblings was Catherine Van Cortlandt de Peyster, who married Benjamin Hazard Field, and Mary Elizabeth de Peyster. His brother was James Ferguson De Peyster, who married Frances Goodhue Ashton (the parents of Frederic James de Peyster).

His paternal grandfather was Col. James Abraham de Peyster, the brother of Arent DePeyster, both of whom were descended from Arent Schuyler and Abraham de Peyster (the 20th Mayor of New York City). His maternal grandparents were Commissary general Samuel Hake and Helen (née Livingston) Hake (the daughter of Loyalist merchant Robert Gilbert Livingston).

De Peyster attended Columbia College during the War of 1812, graduating in 1816. While at Columbia, he was a member of the Philolexian Society,and he was a Captain in a student corps known as the "College Greens" that helped construct the field works at McGowan's Pass on the heights between Harlem and Manhattanville.

== Career ==
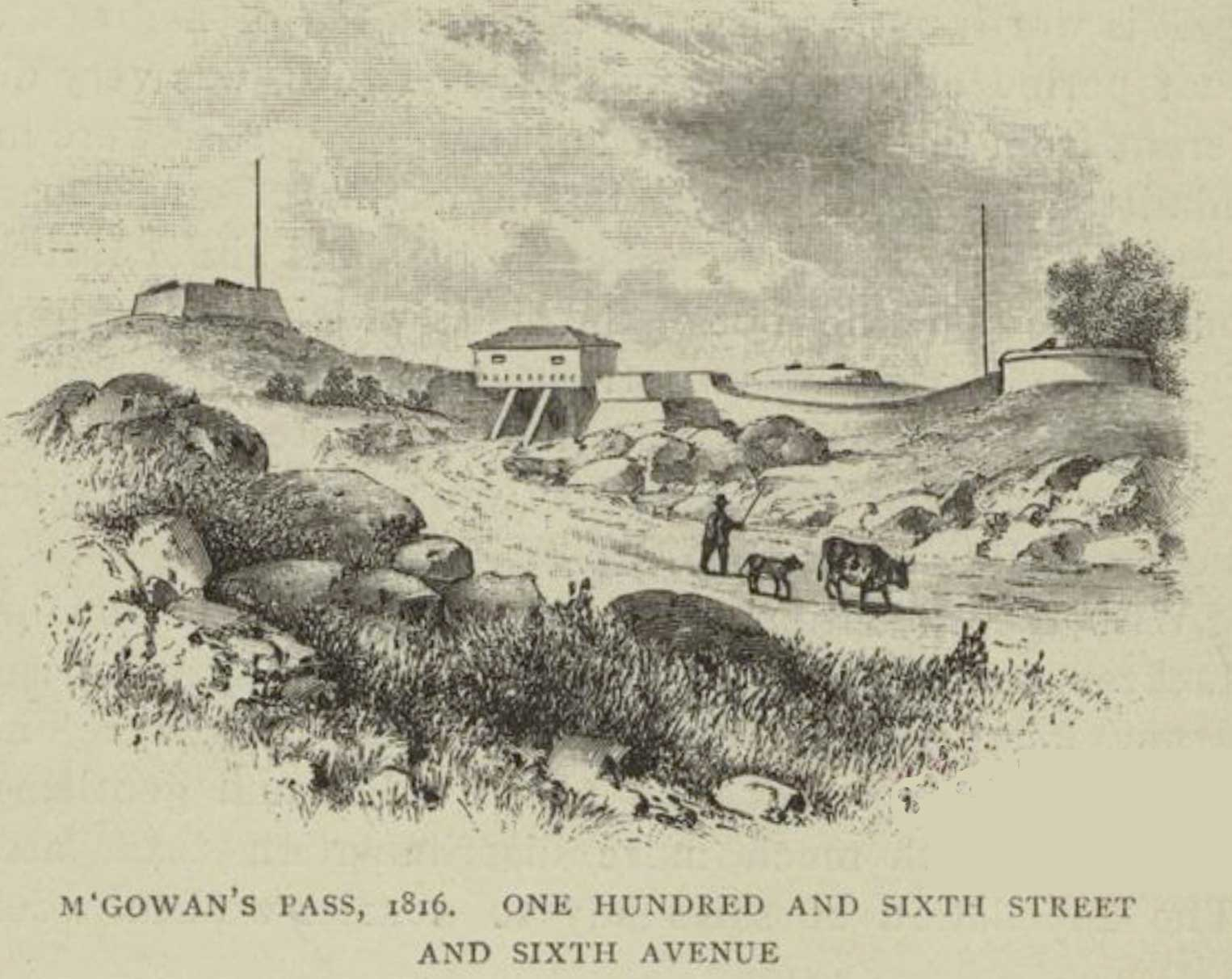
McGowan's Pass in 1816 with gatehouse with fortifications on either side.

De Peyster studied law with Peter A. Jay and Peter van Schaack of Kinderhook, New York, and was admitted to the bar in 1819 and began the practice of law in New York City.

In 1820, he was appointed master in chancery, holding the office until 1837, when his judicious investments had so increased his inherited fortune that he was compelled to resign his office and devote himself to the management of his estate.

He was at various periods a trustee of the Bible Society, and served on the boards of management of many charitable and educational institutions, besides giving liberally to their support. He was at different times president of the New York Historical Society, a founder and director of the Home for Incurables, and vice-president of the Society for the Prevention of Cruelty to Children, founder of the Soldiers' Home erected by the Grand Army of the Republic, and a trustee of the New York Society Library. From 1841 to 1851, he was a member of the vestry of the Church of the Ascension and, from 1851 to 1883, a warden of the parish. In 1867, he received the degree of LL.D. from Columbia, and in 1877 was elected an honorary fellow of the Royal Historical Society of Great Britain.

Several of de Peyster's addresses were published in pamphlet form, for example The Life and Administration of Richard, Earl of Bellomont, Governor of the Provinces of New York, Massachusetts, and New Hampshire, from 1697 to 1701, which was an address delivered before the New York Historical Society at the celebration of its 75th anniversary on November 18, 1879.

== Personal life ==
In May 1820, de Peyster was married to Mary Justina Watts (1801–1821), the youngest daughter of John Watts, Jr. (1749–1838), a U.S. Representative who also served as the last royal Recorder of New York City. Together, they were the parents of John Watts de Peyster (1821–1907), a New York City author and philanthropist. After the death of his wife, Frederic married Maria Antoinette (née Kane) Hone (1798–1869), the daughter of John Kane and widow of John Hone (1798–1869), in 1839.

De Peyster died on August 17, 1882, in Tivoli, New York. His funeral was held at St. Paul's Protestant Episcopal Church in Tivoli.

=== Descendants ===
Through his son John, he was the grandfather of three grandsons who all served in the conflict in the Union Army, including John Watts de Peyster Jr. (1841–1873), an aide-de-camp and artillery commander with the Army of the Potomac who mustered out as a brevet brigadier general, Frederic de Peyster III (1842–1874), a Colonel and surgeon, and Johnston Livingston de Peyster (1846–1903), a second lieutenant in charge of a battery of artillery credited with hoisting the first Union flag over the Confederate capitol of Richmond, Virginia, after its fall.

=== Legacy ===
According to Harper's Weekly: "The venerable Mr. Frederic De Peyster... was a man of singular uprightness and purity of character, a broad philanthropist, and an ardent lover of art and literature."

Frederic de Peyster is the namesake of De Peyster, New York.

== Published works ==
- The Culture Demanded by the Age
- William the Third as a Reformer
- Prominent Men of the English Revolution
- Address on the Life and Administration of Richard, Earl of Bellomont
- Early Political History of New York
