= Tobias Ten Eyck House and Cemeteries =

Historic site in Albany County, New York

- U.S. National Register of Historic Places
- Location within New York Location within the United States
- Location: Old Ravena Rd. (Pictuay Rd.) N of jct. with US 9W, Coeymans, New York
- Coordinates: 42°30′45″N 73°48′18″W
- Area: 93 acres (38 ha)
- Built: 1758
- Architectural style: Colonial
- NRHP reference No.: 94001375
- Added to NRHP: November 25, 1994

Tobias Ten Eyck House and Cemeteries is a historic home and cemeteries located at Coeymans in Albany County, New York. It was built about 1758 and is a rectangular, 1 1/2-story brick dwelling on a coursed stone foundation. It is topped by a gambrel roof and end wall chimneys. The property includes two burial grounds; one for the Ten Eyck family and another for the family slaves.

It was listed on the National Register of Historic Places in 1994.
