= Abraham de Peyster (captain) =

American Loyalist military officer (1753–1798)

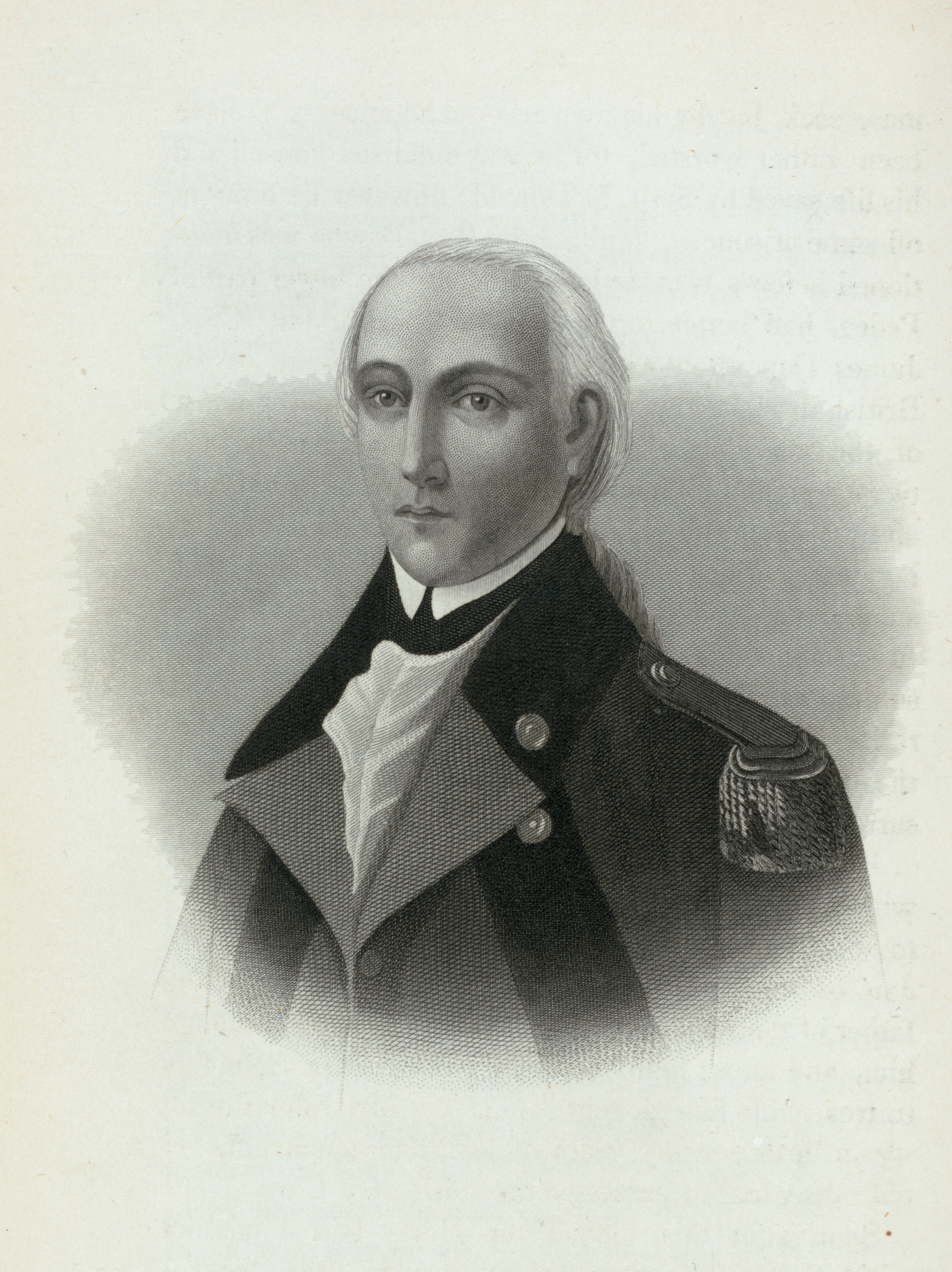
- Born: February 18, 1753; New York City
- Died: February 19, 1798 (aged 45); Saint John, Colony of New Brunswick
- Spouse: Catharine Augusta Livingston
- Relatives: Abraham de Peyster
- Military career
- Allegiance: British Empire
- Branch: Provincial Corps
- Rank: Captain
- Unit: King's American Regiment
- Conflicts: American Revolutionary War; Battle of King's Mountain (surrendered)

Captain Abraham de Peyster (18 February 1753 – 19 February 1798) was an American-born military officer who was a Loyalist during the American Revolutionary War. He is best known for leading a Loyalist force during the Battle of Kings Mountain and for helping to settle United Empire Loyalist refugees in New Brunswick.

== Biography ==
=== American Revolution ===
Born in 1753 into an upper-class Dutch-American family long settled in New York City, Abraham was the great-grandson and namesake of former city mayor Abraham de Peyster. Upon the outbreak of war in 1775–1776 between Patriots who rebelled against the colonial administration and Loyalists who continued to support British government, de Peyster chose the Monarchist side. He served in the King's American Regiment, a regiment of Loyalists who were ordered to serve in the interior of the American colonies to re-awaken loyal sentiment and hearten those opposed to the rebels, and was commissioned in December 1776 as a captain.

This became dangerous duty in the rebel colony of South Carolina, where de Peyster served under and tried to assist his regimental commander, Major Patrick Ferguson. Major Ferguson had led the regiment into the Upcountry of South Carolina, where he and his men were badly outnumbered, and into the decisive Battle of Kings Mountain on October 7, 1780. After the hemmed-in Loyalist regiments tried to entrench themselves on a low mountaintop near Kings Pinnacle, 1,100 Patriot militiamen known as the Overmountain Men surrounded the Loyalists and opened fire. The Loyalists were besieged and, after the combat death of Major Ferguson, Captain de Peyster became the regiment's de facto commander. His strategic position was hopeless and he chose to offer a white flag of surrender. Although the battle was over, many of Patriot militiamen continued to shoot down their defeated enemies, allegedly in retaliation for the recent Loyalist massacre of surrendered Patriots following the Battle of Waxhaws. Until the Patriot officers finally reestablished control over their men, de Peyster was forced to watch as his men were massacred. By the end, there were 1,018 Loyalist casualties and only 698 living prisoners, including de Peyster.

=== New Brunswick ===
Following the decisive defeat of the British and Loyalist forces at the Battle of Yorktown in 1781, de Peyster was allowed to return to the royal garrison in his home city of New York. There, on 2 August 1783, he married Catharine Augusta Livingston. He and Catharine evacuated New York in November 1783, bound for British North America. In 1785, the couple began a new life in the recently organized Colony of New Brunswick.

In consideration of his services to the Crown, de Peyster was granted lands and appointed to a variety of official posts. In 1792, he was appointed by royal Lieutenant Governor Thomas Carleton to be Treasurer of the new colony. While serving in office as Treasurer, however, de Peyster died in Saint John in February 1798. Although honored by his superiors and his neighbors, colonial records indicate that de Peyster died intestate and insolvent.
