= Frederic James de Peyster =

American soldier, lawyer and member of New York Society during the Gilded Age

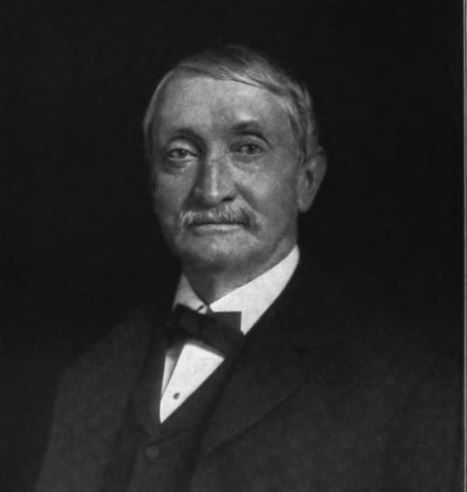

President of the Saint Nicholas Society of the City of New York
- In office 1892–1893
- Preceded by: James William Beekman
- Succeeded by: Chauncey Mitchell Depew

Personal details
- Born: February 5, 1839 New York City, US
- Died: May 10, 1905 (aged 66) Lakewood, New Jersey, US
- Spouse: Augusta McEvers Morris (m. 1871)
- Relations: Goodhue Livingston (nephew)
- Children: 5
- Parent(s): James Ferguson de Peyster; Frances Goodhue Ashton
- Education: College of the City of New York; Columbia Law School
- Awards: Order of Orange-Nassau

Frederic James de Peyster (February 5, 1839 – May 10, 1905) was an American soldier, lawyer, and member of New York Society during the Gilded Age.

== Early life ==
Frederic James de Peyster was born on February 5, 1839, in New York City. He was the first of five children born to James Ferguson de Peyster (1794–1874) and his second wife, Frances Goodhue (née Ashton) de Peyster (1805–1871). His father was a widower of Susan Maria Clarkson, with whom he had one child, Susan Maria de Peyster (1823–1910), who married Robert Edward Livingston (1820–1889) of Clermont. (Note: His father's first wife, Susan Maria Clarkson (1800–1823), was the daughter of General Matthew Clarkson and sister-in-law of Peter Augustus Jay.) Through his half-sister Susan, he was the uncle of Goodhue Livingston, the prominent New York architect. Frederic was the only child from his parents marriage to marry and have children.

His maternal grandfather was William Ashton. His paternal grandparents were Helen Livingston Hake and Frederic de Peyster who fought for the British crown during the American Revolution and was descended from Arent Schuyler and Abraham de Peyster (the 20th Mayor of New York City). His uncle was Frederic de Peyster. (Note: Through this uncle, his father's younger brother who was also named Frederic de Peyster (1796–1882), he was a first cousin of Gen. John Watts de Peyster (1821–1907))

De Peyster prepared for college at the private school of Dr. Dennis. He graduated from College of the City of New York in 1860 with an A.B. degree and later an A.M. degree. He studied law at Columbia Law School, graduating in 1862 with an LL.B. degree, and in 1864 with an LL.M. degree.

== Career ==
After being admitted to the bar, de Peyster practiced law in New York for many years. He was associated with the firm Tremaine & Tyler. From his father, he inherited a significant fortune, enabling him to avoid being "tied down to his professional duties, and much of his time has been spent in the interests of charity."

De Peyster, who was "deeply interested in historic and patriotic subjects," served as president of the Holland Society, governor of the Society of Colonial Wars, president of the New York Dispensary and chairman of the New York Society Library. He was also involved with the American School of Classical Studies at Athens, serving for several years as the New York trustee and treasurer. He served as treasurer of The Bank for Savings in the City of New-York.

=== Society life ===
In 1892, both de Peyster and his wife Augusta were included in Ward McAllister's "Four Hundred", purported to be an index of New York's best families, published in The New York Times. Conveniently, 400 was the number of people that could fit into Mrs. Astor's ballroom. De Peyster was a member of the Saint Nicholas Society, serving as president. (Note: The Saint Nicholas Society of the City of New York is an organization in New York City of men descended from early inhabitants of the State of New York.) During his time as president, he was awarded the Order of Orange-Nassau by Queen Wilhelmina of the Netherlands.

== Personal life ==
On October 10, 1871, Frederic was married to Augusta McEvers Morris (1851–1911), a daughter of William Henry Morris (1810–1896) and his second wife, Ella (née Birckhead) Morris. (Note: Her grandparents were Helen (née Van Cortlandt) Morris (1768–1812) and James Morris (1764–1827), High Sheriff of New York. James was a son of Lewis Morris (1726–1798), signor of the Declaration of Independence, from the prominent Colonial-era Morris family of the Morrisania section of the Bronx.) Her half-brother was Augustus Newbold Morris. Together, they had a home at 11 East 86th Street in Manhattan and were the parents of:

- Helen Van Courtlandt de Peyster (1872–1923), who married Dr. George Augustus Lung (1862–1921) in 1908.
- Frederic Ashton de Peyster (1875–1951), who married Alice Abercrombie-Miller (1885–1965), daughter of James Abercrombie-Miller, in 1908. (Note: Alice's sister, Edith Abercrombie Miller (1883-1954), was married to lawyer, banker, golfer, and philanthropist Walter Tuckerman (1881-1961).) They divorced in 1934 and he married Louise (née Slagle) Todd in 1939. (Note: Louise was the widow of James Todd and the mother of James Todd Jr., who married Frederic's daughter, Alice Townsend de Peyster, in 1933. His first wife Alice remarried to Count Bohdan K. de Castellane, a member of the Polish branch of the de Castellane family of Europe.)
- Frances Goodhue de Peyster (1876–1935), a philanthropist.
- Augusta Morris de Peyster (b. 1877), a philanthropist.
- Ella Morris de Peyster (b. 1881), who married William Brock Shoemaker (1883–1906), brother of Henry W. Shoemaker, in December 1905. Shoemaker was only 22 years old when he died in a tragic death in an elevator accident a few months after their wedding. She married Morton L. Schwartz, a banker and horse breeder, (Note: Schwartz owned Bold Venture which won both the Kentucky Derby and Preakness Stakes in 1936, after their divorce.) in 1915. They divorced in 1926, and she purchased Crossways, the former villa of Stuyvesant Fish and Marion Anthon Fish in Newport.

De Peyster died in Lakewood, New Jersey, where the family vacationed, on May 11, 1905. He was buried in his family's vault in Trinity Church Cemetery. His entire estate was left to his widow and five children with his widow receiving 3/8ths and each child receiving 1/8th.

=== Descendants ===
Through his eldest daughter Helen, he was the grandfather of George Livingston de Peyster (b. 1909), (Note: George was born with the surname Lung but had it legally changed to de Peyster. George and Shirley divorced in 1955 after having two sons.) who married Shirley Tucker Hull (1918–2014) in 1942. Through his son Frederic Ashton, he was the grandfather of Alice Townsend de Peyster (b. 1910), who married James Todd Jr.; Frederic Ashton de Peyster Jr. (b. 1911); and Helen Van Courtlandt de Peyster (b. 1913), who married Erica A. von Raits; James Abercrombie de Peyster, who married Dorothy Shelby Siems, the daughter of Princess Irbain-Khan Kaplanoff.
