= Johannes de Peyster =

American politician

24th Mayor of New York City
- In office September 29, 1698 – September 28, 1699
- Preceded by: William Merritt
- Succeeded by: David Provost

Assessor of New York
- In office 1692–1693

Personal details
- Born: Johannes de Peyster II; September 21, 1666 New York City, New York
- Died: September 25, 1711 (aged 45) New York City, New York
- Spouse: Anna Bancker
- Children: 12, including Johannes
- Parent(s): Johannes de Peyster, Sr. Cornelia Lubberts
- Relatives: Abraham de Peyster (brother); David Provost (brother-in-law)

Military service
- Allegiance: New York
- Branch/service: 2nd Battalion, Company of Foot, New York
- Rank: Captain

Johannes de Peyster or Johannes de Peyster II (September 21, 1666 – September 25, 1711) was the 24th Mayor of New York City between 1698 and 1699.

== Early life ==
Johannes was born in New York City in 1666 to Johannes and Cornelia Lubberts de Peyster. Johannes's brother Abraham de Peyster served as mayor from 1691 to 1694, and his sister, Maria De Peyster, was married to David Provost.

In 1695, he was a Captain with the 2nd Battalion, Company of Foot, New York.

== Career ==
De Peyster was Assessor of New York from 1692 to 1693, the Assistant Alderman of New York 1694 to 1696, a member of Provincial Legislature, and served as the 24th Mayor of New York City between 1698 and 1699. While mayor, the first Trinity Church was built, the first Anglican Church in New York City, after Governor Fletcher's request was approved by King William III. He was succeeded as mayor by his brother-in law, David Provost.

In addition to his stint as mayor, he served in the colonial assembly.

== Personal life ==
Coat of Arms of Johannes de Peyster

Johannes married Anna Bancker (1670–1740), an Albany native and the daughter of Gerrit Bancker, a pioneer fur trader, and Elizabeth Van Epps. Anna was the younger sister of Evert Bancker, the 3rd and 12th Mayor of Albany, New York. Together they had:

- Johannes de Peyster (1689–1693), who died aged 3
- Gerardus de Peyster (1691–1694), who died aged 3
- Elizabeth de Peyster (1692–1760), who married James Beekman (1687–1730)
- Johannes de Peyster III (1694–1789), who served as mayor of Albany and married Anna Schuyler (1697–1750), daughter of Myndert Schuyler and Rachel Cuyler.
- Cornelia de Peyster (1695–1753), who was married to Matthew Clarkson (1699–1739) and Gilbert Tennent (1703–1764),
- Gerardus de Peyster (b. 1697), who married Eva van Nuys Ouke
- Anna de Peyster (1700–1735)
- William de Peyster (1701–1701), who died young
- Abraham de Peyster (b. 1704)
- Maria de Peyster (b. 1706), who married Gerard Bancker in 1731.
- William de Peyster (1709–1784), who married Margareta Roosevelt (1709–1776), daughter of Johannes Roosevelt
- Catharina de Peyster (b. 1711), who married Hendrick Rutgers (1712–1779)

According to some sources, Johannes was known as "Johannes de Peyster II" and his son as "III".

=== Descendants ===
His grandsons include Gerard Bancker (1740–1799), New York State Treasurer from 1778 to 1798, and Henry Rutgers (1745–1830), namesake of Rutgers College. His granddaughters, Anna de Peyster (1723–1794) and Rachel de Peyster, married New York State Senator Volkert P. Douw (who served in the 9th New York State Legislature) and Tobias Ten Eyck, respectively.
