= David Provost =

American politician

25th Mayor of New York City
- In office 1699–1700
- Preceded by: Johannes de Peyster
- Succeeded by: Isaac De Riemer

Personal details
- Born: January 16, 1670 New York, New York
- Died: 1724 (aged 53–54)
- Resting place: Poughkeepsie Rural Cemetery
- Spouses: Helena Byvanck (m. 1691; died 1698) Maria De Peyster (1699–1700) Elizabeth Wakeman (after 1708)
- Relations: Johannes de Peyster III (nephew)
- Parent(s): David Provost Sr. Catherine Laurens

David Provost or David Provoost (January 16, 1670 – 1724) was the 25th mayor of New York City, serving his appointment to the position from 1699 to 1700.

== Early life ==
David Provost was born at his family's Pearl Street home, near Fulton Street, in modern day Financial District, Manhattan in New York City, on January 16, 1670, to David Provost Sr. (1642-1720), one of New Amsterdam's Dutch burghers, and Tryntje "Catherine" (née Laurens) Provost (1650–1707).

== Career ==
In 1699, David Provost was appointed Mayor. During his administration, two new market houses were erected, one at Coenties Slip and the other at the foot of Broad Street. A hospital-home for the poor was established. Public street cleaners were hired, and homeowners were directed to pave in front of their houses or face a fine of twenty shillings.

The ferry to Long Island was contracted out for a term of seven years at a rent of one hundred and sixty-five pounds sterling per year. By the conditions of lease, the lessee was required to keep two large boats for corn and cattle, and two smaller boats for passengers. The city engaged to build a ferry-house on Nassau or Long Island, which the ferry operator was required to keep in repair.

In 1699, the firing of guns within New York City was strictly forbidden. A powder-house was ordered to be built for public use, and all persons were prohibited from keeping more than fifty pounds of powder in their house. A tax was levied on all flour and bread brought into the city. This tax, however, proved unpopular, and was annulled a few weeks later.

Provost was succeeded in office by Isaac De Riemer in 1700. After his tenure as Mayor, Provost served for a time as alderman.

== Personal life ==
On June 1, 1691, Provost married Helena Byvanck (d. 1698) of Albany. Together, they were the parents of:

- Belitje Provost (b. 1692), who married Henry Coens
- Catharina Provost (b. 1694), who married Abraham Van Wyck (1695–1756)
- David Provost III (b. 1695), who married Johanna Rynders.
- Helena Provost (b. 1698), who married Cornelius Santvoort (b. 1692)

After her death, married Maria De Peyster (1659–1700) on January 28, 1699, the sister of his predecessor as Mayor, Johannes de Peyster, widow of John Spratt. Her daughter, Maria Spratt (1693–1760) was married to James Alexander (1691–1756), Attorney General of New Jersey. After her death, he married for the third time on May 15, 1708, to Elizabeth Wakeman (b. 1657), widow of Albert Dinny, of Fairfield, Connecticut.

He died in 1724 and his will was probated on January 27, 1724.

== Legacy ==
Provost Avenue in The Bronx, New York is named for him.
