= Evert Bancker (mayor) =

American mayor

3rd and 12th Mayor of Albany, New York
- In office 1707–1709
- Preceded by: Johannes Abeel
- Succeeded by: Dirck Wesselse Ten Broeck
- In office 1695–1696
- Preceded by: David Davidse Schuyler
- Succeeded by: Johannes Abeel

Personal details
- Born: January 24, 1665 Albany, Albany County, Province of New York
- Died: July 1734 (aged 69) Guilderland, Albany County, Province of New York
- Citizenship: Great Britain
- Spouse: Elizabeth Abeel (m. 1686; died 1734)
- Children: 13
- Parent(s): Gerrit Bancker; Elizabeth Van Epps
- Relatives: Evert Bancker (grandson); Johannes Abeel (brother-in-law); Johannes de Peyster (brother-in-law)

Evert Bancker (January 24, 1665 in Albany, New York – July 1734 in Guilderland, New York) was an American trader and politician who was Mayor of Albany from 1695 to 1696 and from 1707 to 1709.

== Early life ==
He was the only surviving son of Gerrit Bancker (1635–1691), a pioneer fur trader, and Lysbet "Elizabeth" Van Epps (1630–1693), a trader's daughter with ties to the Mohawk Valley. His younger sister, Anna Bancker (1670–1740), married Johannes de Peyster, the Mayor of New York City.

His father died in 1691, and he was named co-executor of the estate. Upon the death of his mother in 1693, he inherited a substantial family estate that included holdings in Albany and New York. He was among a number of Albany natives who maintained dual residency - being admitted to the "Freedom" of New York City in 1697.

== Career ==
He followed his father in the fur trade and used his earnings to acquire land. His Albany house was located on the South side of today's State Street just east of his father's home.

He was elected to the Albany Common Council - serving as assistant for the First Ward in 1688 and as alderman beginning in 1689. He was one of the few City Fathers who accepted appointment to the council during the regime of Jacob Leisler. Re-elected as alderman in 1691, he held that seat until 1707. Bancker was appointed the third Mayor of Albany in 1694 and served for a year. He was appointed mayor again in 1707, serving until 1709. He was elected to the Provincial Assembly of New York in 1702 and, with his brother-in-law Johannes Abeel, was appointed Master of the Provincial Chancery Court in 1705.

After the Peace of 1713, he retired from municipal affairs and gave the State Street property to his nephew Johannes De Peyster. He moved with his family to his farm in Guilderland, several miles west of Albany. He continued trading and maintained his position as Commissioner of Indian Affairs, making a number of trips to the Iroquois country.

== Personal life ==
Coat of Arms of Evert Bancker

On September 24, 1686, he married Elizabeth Abeel (1671–1734). She was the sister of Johannes Abeel, who also served as Mayor of Albany. He was an officer of the church and the friend of Dominie Johannes Lydius. Their family was large as they baptized thirteen children in the Albany Dutch Church between 1688 and 1710, including:

- Gerardus Bancker (b. 1688), who died young.
- Neeltje Bancker (1689–1712)
- Gerardus Bancker (b. 1691), who died young.
- Elisabeth Bancker (1693–1744), who married Gerrit Lansing, son of Johannes G. Lansing, in 1715.
- Christoffel Bancker (1695–1762), who married Elizabeth Hooglant (b. 1699), in New York 1719.
- Anna Bancker (1697–1706), who died young.
- Willem Bancker (1699–1772), who married Annatje Gerritse Veeder (b. 1703), daughter of Gerrit Symonse Veeder (1674–1755), in 1726.
- Jannetje Bancker (1701–1757), who married Harmanus Schuyler (1700–1748), son of David Davidse Schuyler.
- Adrianus Bancker (b. 1703), who married G. Elisabeth Van Taerling in 1729.
- Gerardus Bancker (1706–1755), who married Maria de Peyster (1710–1759), daughter of Johannes de Peyster, in 1731.
- Anna Bancker (1708–1709), who died young.
- Johannes Bancker (1709–1710), who died young.
- Johannes Bancker (b. 1710), who married Magdalena Veeder (b. 1710), sister of his brother's wife.

Following the death of his wife in March 1734, he made his last will. The widower left his estate including the "farm where I now live" to his seven living children. Intending to live there under the care of his son, Johannes, he died in July and was buried on the Guilderland farm.

=== Descendants ===
His grandson Evert Bancker (1721–1803), was Speaker of the New York State Assembly from 1779 to 1783.

== See also ==
- History of Albany, New York

== Sources ==
Political offices
Preceded by David Davidse Schuyler	Mayor of Albany, New York; 1707–1709	Succeeded by Johannes Abeel
Preceded by Johannes Abeel	Mayor of Albany, New York; 1695–1696	Succeeded by Dirck Wesselse Ten Broeck
