= Abraham de Peyster =

Mayor of New York City from 1691 to 1694

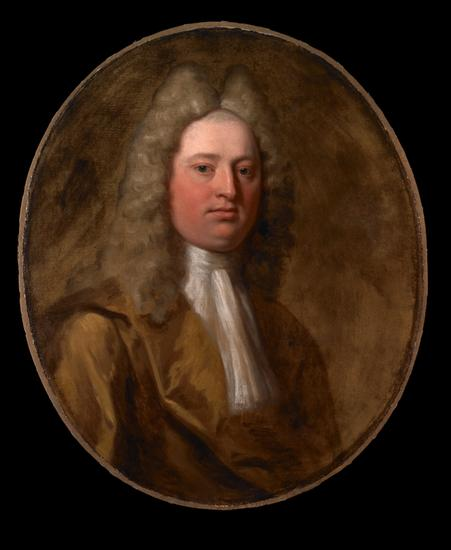

21st Mayor of New York City
- In office 1691–1694
- Governor: Henry Sloughter; Richard Ingoldesby; Benjamin Fletcher
- Preceded by: John Lawrence
- Succeeded by: Charles Lodwik

Personal details
- Born: July 8, 1657 New Amsterdam
- Died: August 3, 1728 (aged 71) Province of New York, British America
- Spouse: Catharina de Peyster (m. 1684)
- Relations: Johannes de Peyster (brother); David Provost (brother-in-law)
- Parent(s): Johannes de Peyster Sr. Cornelia Lubberts

Abraham de Peyster (July 8, 1657 – August 3, 1728) was the 21st mayor of New York City from 1691 to 1694, and served as Governor of New York, 1700–1701.

== Early life ==
De Peyster was born in New Amsterdam on July 8, 1657, to Johannes de Peyster Sr. and Cornelia (née Lubberts) de Peyster.

== Career ==
The de Peysters were a wealthy merchant family which had also moved into politics. In October 1691, Abraham was appointed mayor by Governor Henry Sloughter. Though de Peyster had been an early supporter of Jacob Leisler, who led Leisler's Rebellion, he had not participated in Leisler's later actions. Through his suggestion, the city started providing public support to the poor.

Abraham's brother, Johannes de Peyster (1666–1719), served as mayor from 1698 until 1699, and was then succeeded by David Provost, the husband of his sister, Maria de Peyster. Abraham also reportedly served in a number of other public roles during his life, including stints as alderman, Associate Judge and later Chief Justice on the province's Supreme Court, president of the King's Council, and as treasurer for New York and New Jersey provinces.

In addition, he also served as a colonel in the militia.

Some sources state that he served as governor or acting governor of the Province of New York, which refers to a few months' time in 1701 after the death of Richard Coote, 1st Earl of Bellomont, when Lieutenant Governor John Nanfan was abroad. This left de Peyster, as the senior member of the council, briefly in command until Nanfan returned.

Around 1699, de Peyster donated part of his garden for the construction of a new city hall. That building was later renamed Federal Hall, which briefly served as the first capitol of the United States, and the site of the first inauguration of George Washington as president. It was replaced in 1842 with a structure in the style of Greek Revival architecture which is still standing.

== Personal life ==
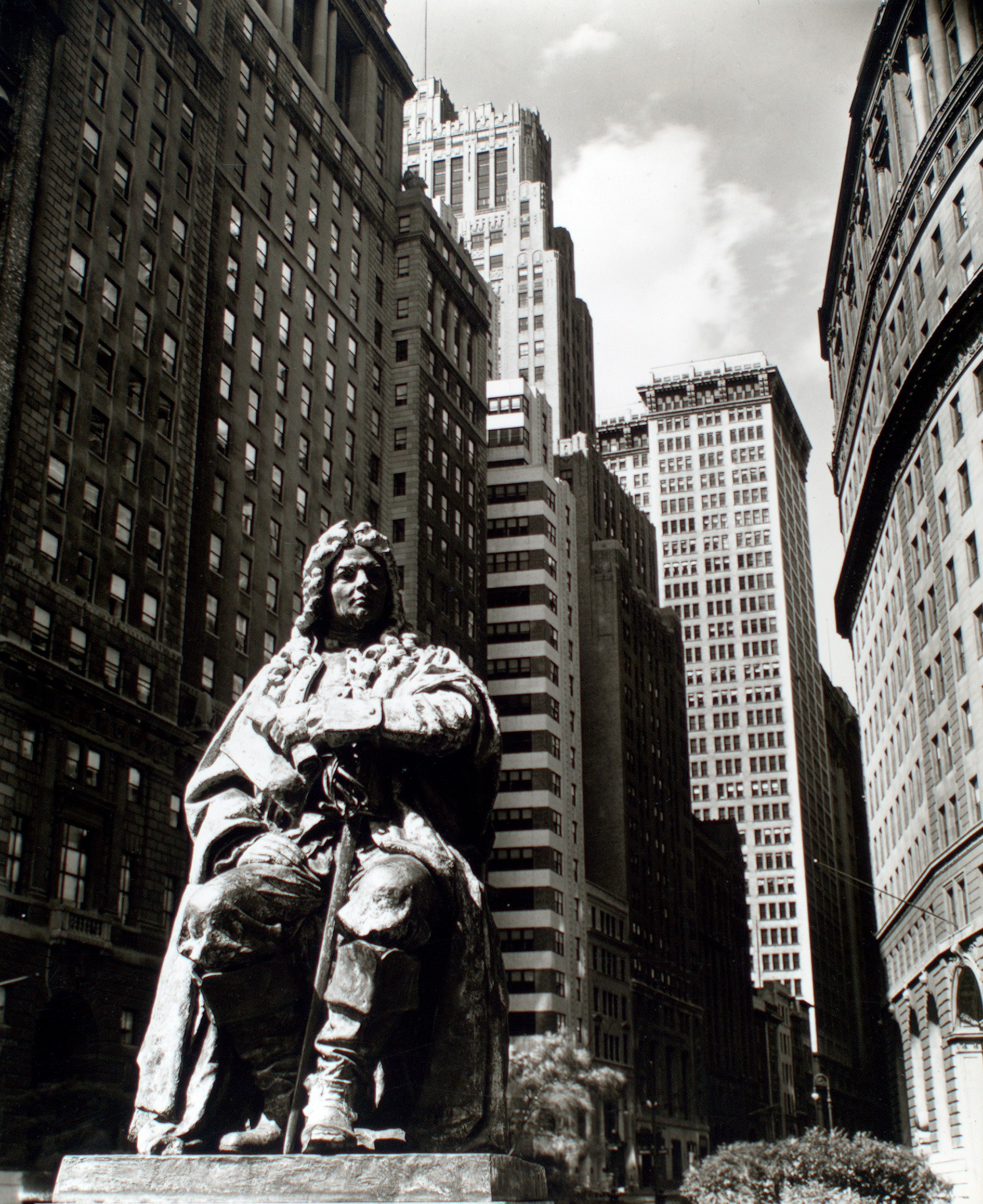
Abraham de Peyster statue (then located in Bowling Green), in the 1930s

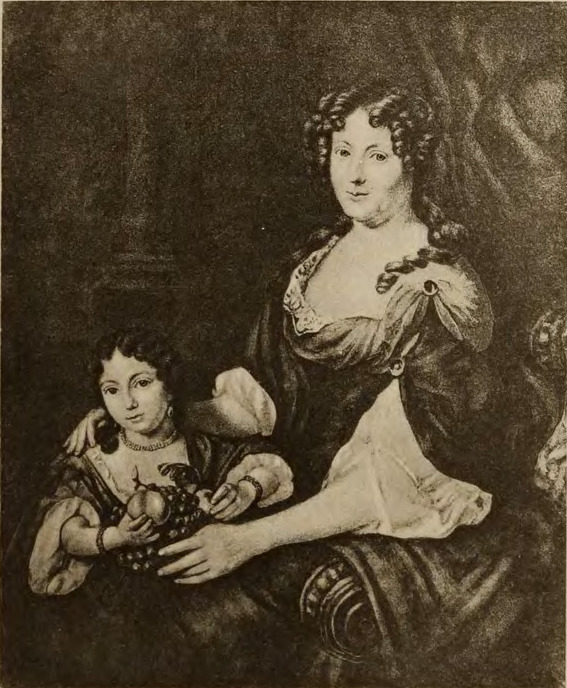
Margareta Katrijn de Peyster

On April 5, 1684, while visiting Amsterdam, he married his second cousin, Catharina de Peyster (1665–c. 1734), the daughter of Pierre de Peyster and Gertrude Van Dyke. Their children included:

- Catherine de Peyster (1688–1734), who married Philip Van Cortlandt, son of Stephanus Van Cortlandt.
- Elizabeth de Peyster (1694–1774), who married John Hamilton, the Governor of New Jersey.
- Abraham de Peyster (1696–1767), who served as the treasurer of the Province of New York and married Margaret Van Cortlandt, daughter of Jacobus Van Cortlandt, in 1722.
- Pierre Guillaume de Peyster (b. 1707), who married Cornelia Schuyler.

The mansion he erected in 1695, which at one time was the headquarters of Washington, remained standing until 1856.

Before his death in 1728, De Peyster commissioned the creation of a bell to be placed in Manhattan’s Middle Dutch Church, then under construction. Cast in Amsterdam in 1731, the bell is known today as the "Liberty Bell" and is located at the Middle Collegiate Church.

=== Legacy ===
His great grandson, also named Abraham de Peyster, briefly led the Loyalists in the Battle of Kings Mountain. Evacuating to British North America after the American Revolution, the younger Abraham became the Treasurer of the new royal colony of New Brunswick.

His 3x-great grandson was John Watts de Peyster, who commissioned a statue of his ancestor in the late 19th century. Sculpted by George Edwin Bissell, the statue was originally placed in Bowling Green Park in Manhattan in the late 1890s. Park and subway renovations forced its removal in 1972, and it was placed in Hanover Square from 1976 until 2004. During subsequent renovations in Hanover Square, the statue was placed in a warehouse for 9 years. In the fall of 2013, it was restored to public view in its current location in Thomas Paine Park near the Supreme Court building.

A duplicate of the New York statue was also donated by John Watts de Peyster to Franklin & Marshall College in Lancaster, Pennsylvania, where it is currently placed on Buchanan Avenue.
