= Richard Stevens (lawyer) =

American attorney (1868–1919)

- Born: May 23, 1868; Paris, France
- Died: May 18, 1919 (aged 50); Hoboken, New Jersey, U.S.
- Education: St. Paul's School
- Alma mater: Columbia College; Columbia Law School
- Spouse: Elizabeth Callendar Stevens (m. 1893)
- Children: 4
- Parent(s): Edwin Augustus Stevens; Martha Bayard Dod Stevens
- Relatives: Edwin A. Stevens Jr. (brother); John Cox Stevens (uncle); Robert L. Stevens (uncle); John Stevens III (grandfather); Albert Baldwin Dod (grandfather); See Stevens family

Richard Stevens (May 23, 1868 – May 18, 1919) was an attorney and real estate developer in Hoboken, New Jersey which his family owned all of at one time.

== Early life ==
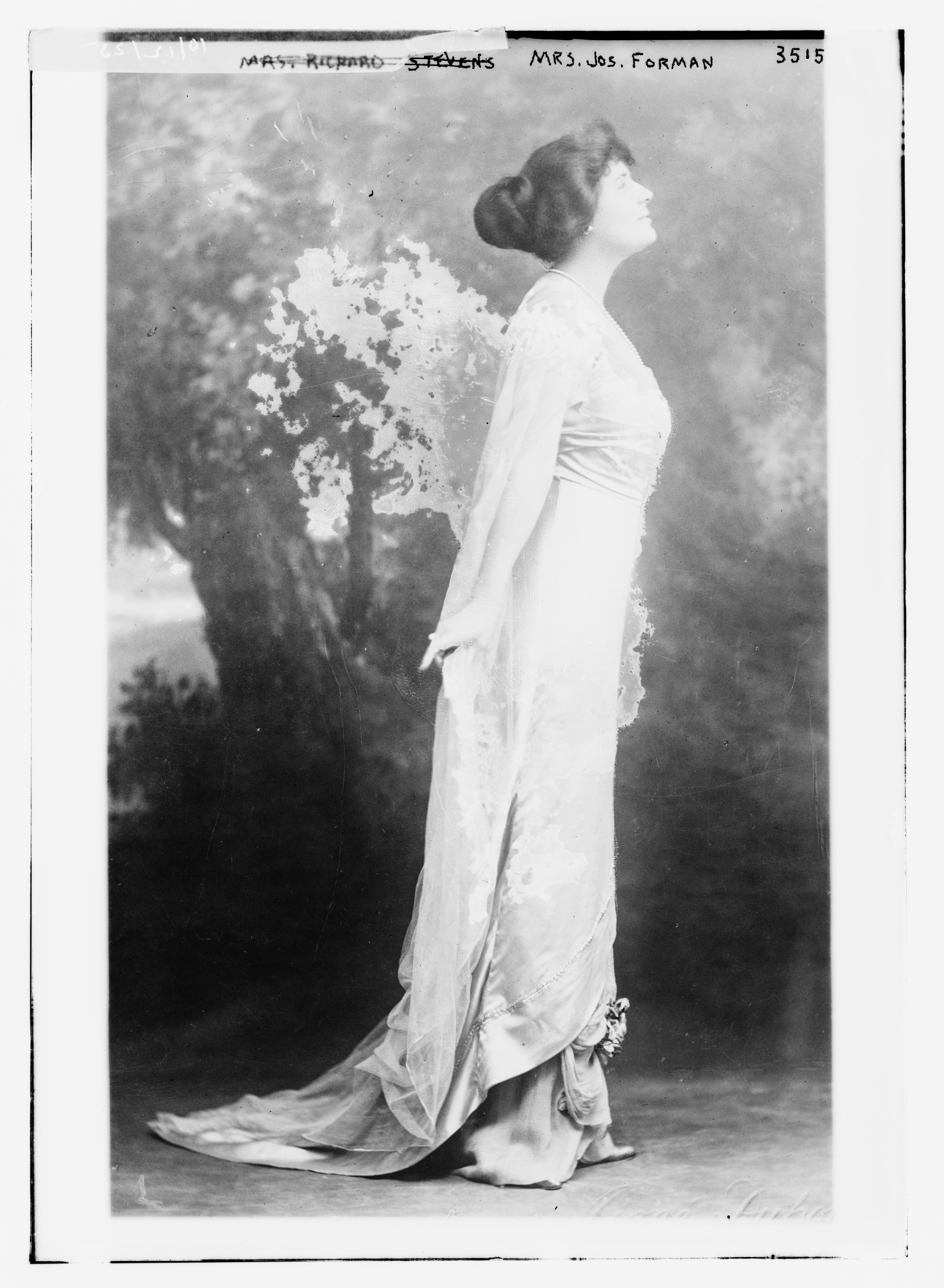
Steven's wife, Elizabeth Callendar Stevens, c. 1910

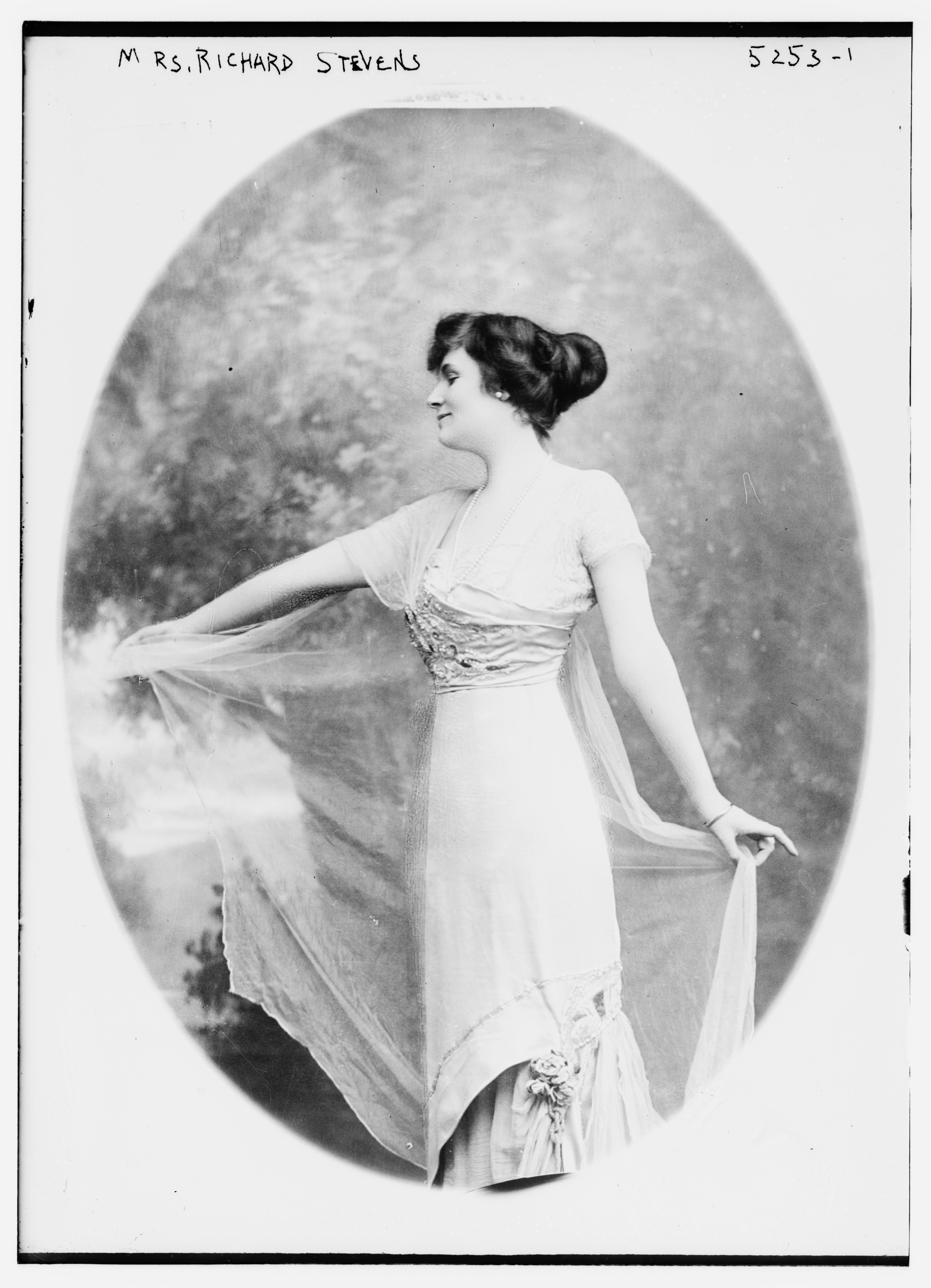
Steven's wife, Elizabeth Callendar Stevens, c. 1915.

Stevens was born in Paris, France on May 23, 1868. He was the son of Martha Bayard (née Dod) Stevens (1831–1899) and Edwin Augustus Stevens (1795–1868), a well-known designer and founder of the Stevens Institute of Technology. Among his siblings was Mary Picton Stevens (the wife of politician Muscoe Russell Hunter Garnett and, later, Edward Parke Custis Lewis, U.S. Minister to Portugal); John Stevens IV (grandfather of Millicent Fenwick); and Edwin Augustus Stevens Jr., founder of the New York design firm Cox & Stevens.

His paternal grandparents were Col. John Stevens III and Rachel (née Cox) Stevens. Among his large and prominent family were uncles Robert Livingston Stevens and John Cox Stevens, founder of the New York Yacht Club and a driving force in the design of the yacht America and the competition for the America's Cup. His maternal grandparents were Caroline Smith (née Bayard) Dod and Albert Baldwin Dod, the Presbyterian theologian and professor of mathematics at Princeton University.

He first attended Stevens High School (from 1880 to 1881) and then the St. Paul's School in Concord, New Hampshire and then entered Columbia College, graduating with an A.B. degree in 1890, following by a J.D. degree from Columbia Law School in 1892.

== Career ==
Following his graduation from Law School in 1892, he was admitted to the bar in 1893. In 1898, he formed the law firm of Lewis, Besson & Stevens, along with Edwin A. Lewis and Judge J. Rufus Besson.

In 1896, Stevens was elected second vice president of Hoboken Land and Improvement Company, which represented the Stevens estate, later serving as its president. His family at one time owned the entire city of what is today, Hoboken.

For sixteen years, he served as "Probation Officer" for Hudson County. He also served as a director of the First National Bank of Hoboken and U.S. Commissioner of Jurors for the District of New Jersey. Stevens was a trustee of the New Jersey Industrial School, a trustee of the Stevens Institute of Technology, and a trustee of the Church of the Holy Innocents, which was built by his mother. In addition, he was the treasurer of Christ Hospital (associated with the Episcopal Diocese of Newark), and president of the United Aid Society.

Soon after the outbreak of World War I, Stevens offered, and the government accepted, the Stevens Mansion, a 40-room mansion which overlooked the Hudson River at Castle Point in Hoboken, for use as a home for convalescing soldiers.

== Personal life ==
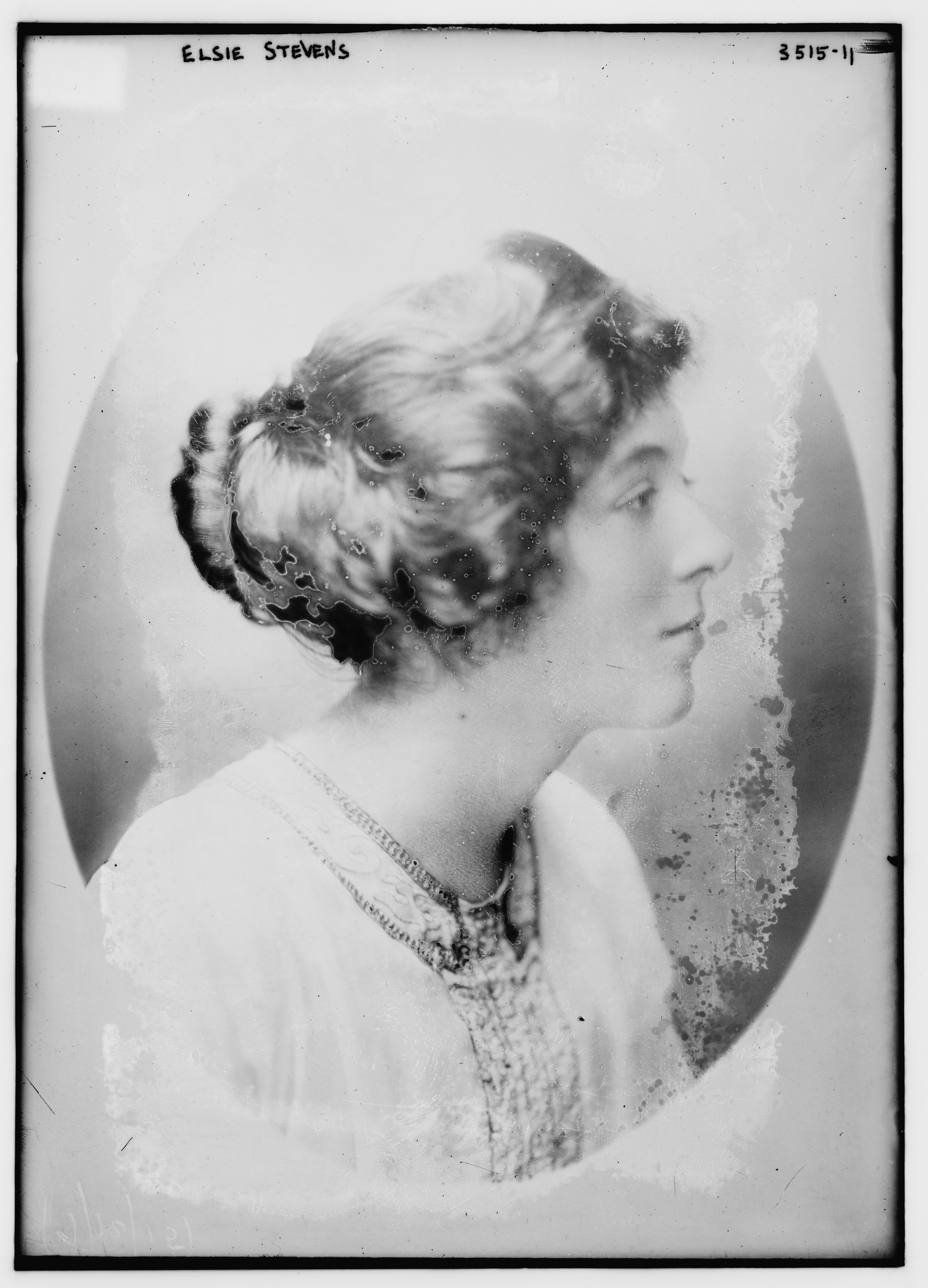
Steven's eldest daughter, Elizabeth Callendar "Elsie" Stevens.

On November 11, 1893, Stevens was married to his first cousin, Elizabeth Callendar Stevens "Elsie" (1869–c. 1963) at St. Peter & St. Paul's Church in Hoboken. Elizabeth, a prominent suffragist, was the daughter of his paternal uncle, Francis Bowes Stevens, and Elizabeth Callendar (née Harris) Stevens. Together they were the parents of four children:

- Elizabeth Callendar "Elsie" Stevens (1895–1920), who died unmarried at age 25.
- Caroline Bayard Stevens (1897–1971), who married Edward Beach Condon (d. 1942), a son of Thomas G. Condon of New York, in 1921. They divorced in 1926. After their divorce, he remarried to Mary McLeod (née Cameron) Mayer (a daughter of Duncan Ewen Cameron), and Caroline remarried to stockbroker and rancher Jack Speiden.
- Dorothy Pintard Stevens, who married architect Matthew Corry Fleming Jr., son of Matthew C. Fleming of 1060 Fifth Avenue, in 1929.
- Richard Stevens Jr. (1905–1985), who studied at the University of Oxford in England.

He was a member of the Union Club, the Racquet and Tennis Club, and the New York Yacht Club.

Stevens died at his home at Castle Point in Hoboken, New Jersey on May 18, 1919. His estate, valued at $2,611,314, was held in trust for the benefit of his children.

After his death, his widow remarried "bohemian writer" and diplomat Josef Forman of Czechoslovakia in London in 1925. The marriage did not last long, and in 1927 they divorced. After her divorce by final decree in Paris in May 1927, she resumed the use of the name, Mrs. Stevens Stevens.

=== Descendants ===
Through his daughter, he was the grandfather of Richard Stevens Condon, who married actress Anne Gerety, and Edward Beach Condon Jr., who married Elizabeth Guest, the sister of Andy Guest and daughter of U.S. Ambassador to Ireland Raymond R. Guest, in 1958. They divorced and she married George Stevens, Jr. in 1965.
