= Archibald Stevens Alexander =

American politician (1880–1912)

Archibald S. Alexander

Member of the New Jersey Assembly
- In office 1907–1907
- In office 1905–1905

Personal details
- Born: Archibald Stevens Alexander; August 22, 1880 Hoboken, New Jersey
- Died: August 30, 1912 (aged 32) Manhattan, New York
- Party: Democratic
- Spouse: Helen Tracy Barney (m. 1905–1912)
- Relations: Martha Bayard Stevens (grandmother); Edwin Augustus Stevens (grandfather); Caroline Bayard Stevens Wittpenn (mother) See Stevens family
- Children: Archibald S. Alexander
- Education: St. Paul's School
- Alma mater: Princeton University; New York Law School

Col. Archibald Stevens Alexander (August 22, 1880 – August 30, 1912) was a lawyer, Democratic politician, and military aide to Woodrow Wilson from New Jersey.

== Early life ==
Alexander was born on August 22, 1880. He was the son of Archibald Alexander (1855–1917), a professor of philosophy at Columbia College, and Caroline Bayard (née Stevens) Alexander (1859–1932). His parents divorced when he was young and, later after his death, she remarried to H. Otto Wittpenn, the 28th Mayor of Jersey City, on January 6, 1915. (Note: His mother, Caroline, waited 20 years after the divorce to marry H. Otto Wittpenn, who was 11 years younger than her. She reportedly waited to ensure that her first husband, who had been missing since the divorce, was no longer living when they married. His father, however, died in Geneva, Switzerland in 1917.)

His maternal grandparents were the noted philanthropist Martha Bayard Stevens (a daughter of professor Albert Baldwin Dod) and Edwin Augustus Stevens (son of Col. John Stevens, who developed early versions of screw-propelled steamboat and steam locomotive). Through his grandfather, an engineer and entrepreneur who is considered the founder of Stevens Institute of Technology, he was a direct descendant of Continental Congressman from New Jersey, John Stevens. His paternal grandparents were Henry Martyn Alexander (a lawyer, Trustee of Princeton, and son of Archibald Alexander, the first Principal of Princeton Theological Seminary) and Susan Mary (née Brown) Alexander (daughter of Rev. Matthew Brown). Among his paternal family were grand-uncles, James Waddel Alexander, William Cowper Alexander, and Joseph Addison Alexander.

He prepared at St. Paul's School in Concord, New Hampshire, before attending Princeton University, where he graduated in 1902. He went to New York Law School, graduating in 1904, and was admitted to the bar in New Jersey.

== Career ==
After law school, Alexander became a member of law firm of Besson, Alexander & Stevens law firm. He served as a member of the New Jersey Assembly in 1905, was defeated in 1906, and served again in 1907.

Beginning in 1911, Alexander served on the Governor Woodrow Wilson's military staff as a colonel. In July 1912, Alexander and three others, including David S. Crater (Secretary of State of New Jersey), and two members of the Democratic National Committee, left their handbags in Gov. Wilson's library and Alexander had to sneak in through a window to retrieve them after the family went to sleep and locked the windows. Gov. Wilson, in his pajamas, caught him while retrieving the bags and the story was widely reported at the time.

At the time of his death, Col. Alexander was campaigning to become the Democratic candidate for the U.S. Congress from New Jersey's 11th congressional district which then included Hoboken. The seat he was running for was won by fellow Democrat John J. Eagan.

== Personal life ==
In 1905, Alexander was married to Helen Tracy Barney (1882–1922) at St. Bartholomew's Church in New York City. She was the daughter of Lily (née Whitney) Barney (daughter of Brig.-Gen. James Scollay Whitney, president of the Metropolitan Steamship Company) and Charles T. Barney, the former president of the Knickerbocker Trust Company. Among her extended family were maternal uncle William Collins Whitney and paternal grandfather Ashbel H. Barney, an early president of Wells Fargo & Company. Before his early death, they lived at Castle Point and were the parents of:

- Archibald Stevens Alexander Jr. (1906–1979), a lawyer who served as the U.S. Under Secretary of the Army and Treasurer of New Jersey.

After an illness of two weeks, Alexander died of typhoid fever on August 30, 1912, aged 32, at St. Luke's Hospital in New York City. (Note: Two weeks before his death, Alexander's coachman, Thomas Purcell, dropped dead from "heart disease".) After a funeral held at the Church of the Holy Innocents in Hoboken, (Note: The Church of the Holy Innocents was built in 1871 by his grandparents, in remembrance of their daughter late Julia (Archibald's aunt), who died in Rome at age seven from typhoid fever.) and attended by Governor Wilson (who was then the Democratic candidate for President), Mayor Wittpenn, and Mayor Cooke, he was buried at Saint Bernards Cemetery in Bernardsville in Somerset County. After his death, his widow remarried to Frederic Newell Watriss, with whom she had another son, James Barney Watriss (who became a horse breeder and aviator).
