= Stevens family =

American family

Stevens
- Current region: United States
- Etymology: Stevens is a patronymic surname as old as the 1300s.
- Origin: believed to originate in England
- Connected families: Bayard family Livingston family
- Distinctions: Hoboken founders, Rail and Naval, Stevens Institute of Technology
- Estate: Castle Point (aka Stevens Castle)

The Stevens family was a prominent American family in New York and New Jersey in the 18th and 19th centuries, whose descendants played a critical role in the formation of the United States (especially New York City and New Jersey), in leading government and business in North America and served as leaders in business, military, politics, and engineering.

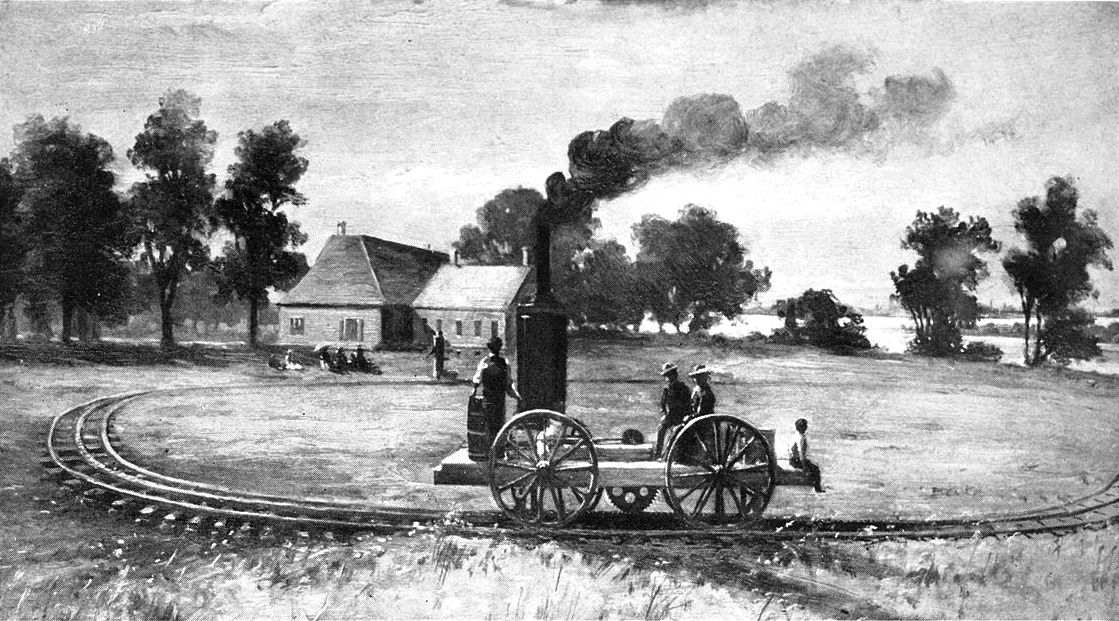
The first American locomotive on rails at Castle Stevens from 1825

== History ==
John Stevens Sr. came to America in 1699 at the age of 17 as an indentured clerk. His son, John Stevens Jr., ended up serving in the American Revolutionary War and ended in a career of politics where he served as president of the convention of New Jersey when the state ratified the United States Constitution on December 18, 1787. His son, John Stevens III, was the first Treasurer of New Jersey, a lawyer, engineer, inventor who constructed the first U.S. steam locomotive, first steam-powered ferry, and first U.S. commercial ferry service, and was influential in the creation of U.S. patent law.

== First Family of Inventors ==
Robert L. Stevens

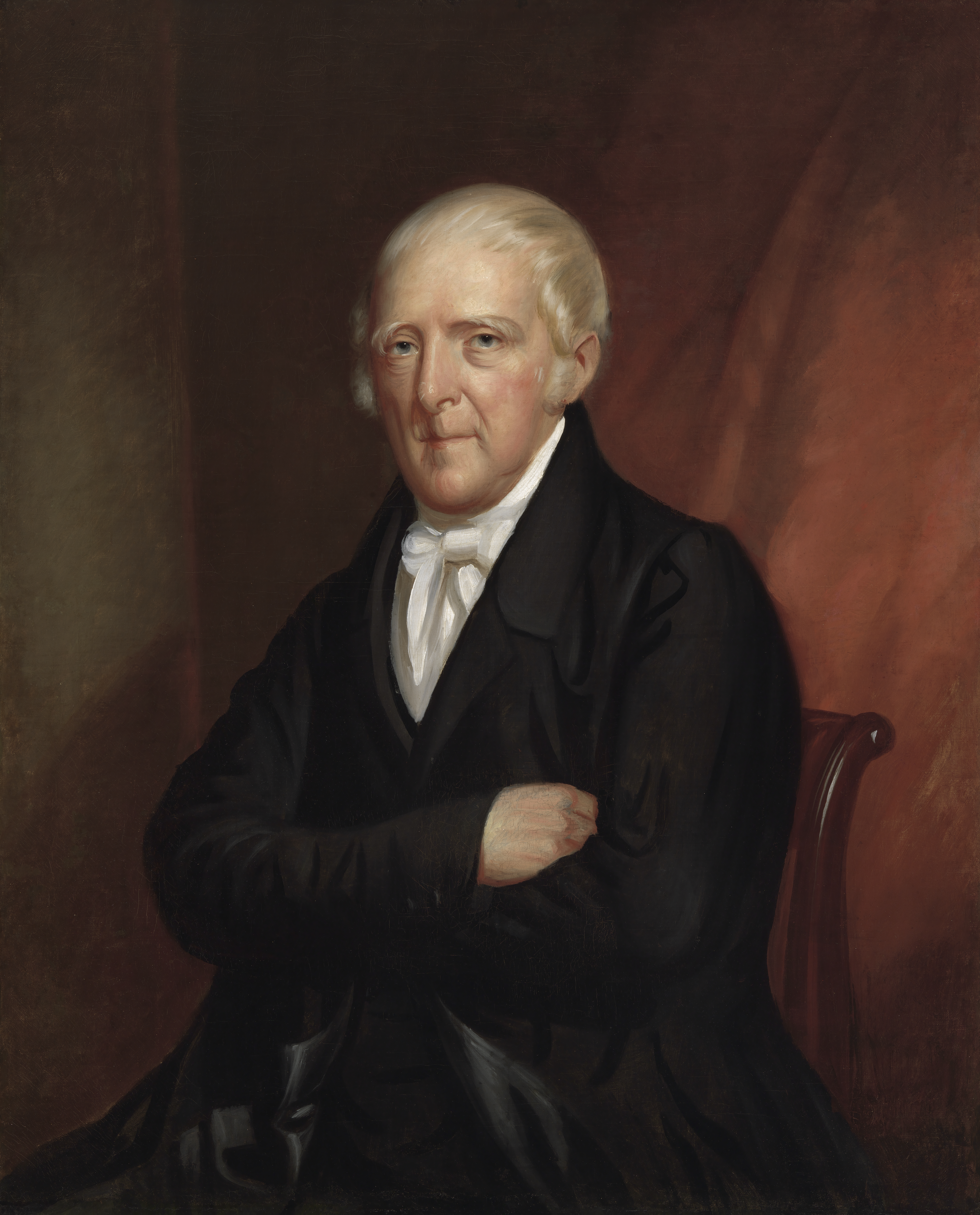
John Stevens III c. 1830.

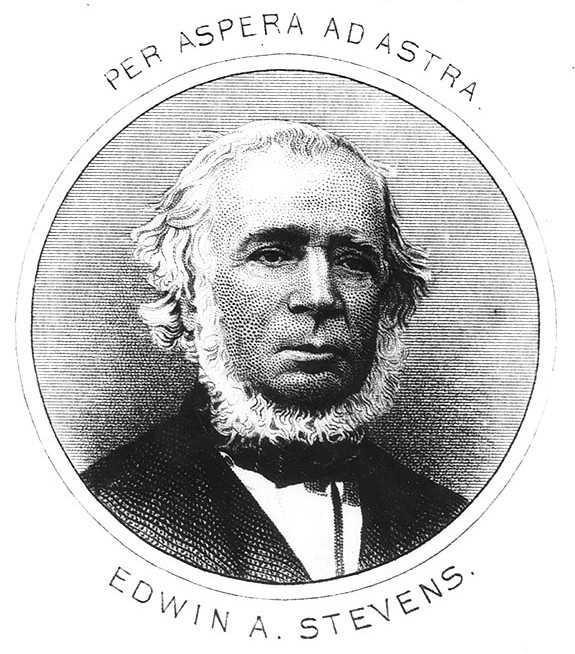
Line engraving of Edwin A. Stevens published in The Stevens Ironclad Battery

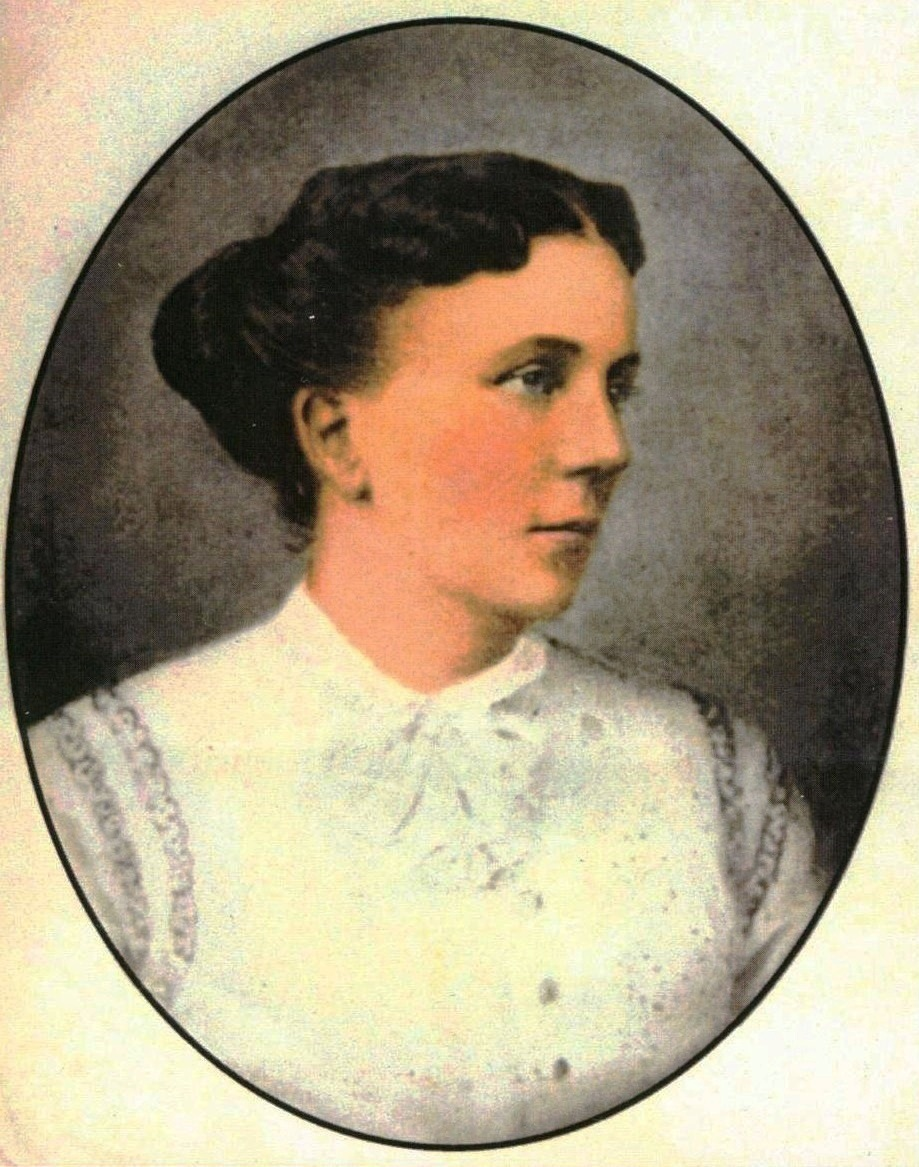
Martha Bayard Stevens

Stevens Institute of Technology is named for "America's First Family of inventors" — the Stevens family. The Stevens Family was known as "America's First Family of inventors". Holding influence over American engineering for decades, designing steamboats, locomotives, railroad tracks and a host of other technical innovations that powered the early United States.

In 1784, the land now occupied by Stevens Institute of Technology was purchased by John Stevens, who would later reverse-engineer the British steam locomotive to American standards for domestic manufacture. This innovation would be employed by ferries to Manhattan. Later generations of ferries still run from Hoboken's piers. Robert L. Stevens, one of John's sons, invented the flanged T rail, a form of railroad rail in prevalent use today, including from the Lackawanna Terminal of Hoboken whose docks are also in a style Robert designed. Along with his brother Edwin A. Stevens, Robert created America's first commercial railroad presently operating as a large portion of Amtrak’s Northeast Corridor.

John Cox Stevens, John Stevens' eldest son, was the first commodore of the New York Yacht Club. He and his brother Edwin built the yacht America and were aboard its 1851 regatta victory in England, later recognized as the first winner of the America's Cup; the competition bears the name of the Stevenses' yacht. The New York Yacht Club would defend its title until the 1983 race.

Edwin died in 1868. In his will, he left a bequest for the establishment of an "institution of learning," providing his trustees with land and funds. Edwin's will was executed by surviving wife, Martha Bayard Stevens, who would also serve as a lifetime Trustee of the institute that now bears the family's name. Martha Stevens oversaw much of the family's philanthropy toward the City of Hoboken, including founding of the Church of the Holy Innocents as a free Episcopal church; a foundling hospital and birthing center at St Mary's Hospital; the Robert L. Stevens Fund for Municipal Research; manual training schools for both boys and young girls in Hoboken; the Hoboken Public Library and Manual Training School.

== Family tree ==
- John Stevens (immigrated to American in the 1690s) m. Ann Campbell
  - John Stevens Jr (1715–1792). m. Elizabeth Alexander, daughter of James Alexander, Surveyor General of New Jersey and New York, and Mary Spratt Alexander, an influential colonial era merchant in New York City.
    - John Stevens III (1749–1838) m. Rachel Cox
      - John Cox Stevens (1785–1857), first commodore of the New York Yacht Club, m. Maria C. Livingston (1799–1865).
      - Robert Livingston Stevens (1787–1856), first president of Camden and Amboy Railroad
      - James Alexander Stevens (1790–1873)
      - Richard Stevens (1792–1835)
      - Francis Bowes Stevens (1793–1812) m. and Elizabeth Callendar (née Harris) Stevens.
        - Elizabeth "Elsie" Callendar Stevens (1869–1963) m. Richard Stevens (1868–1919)
          - See Richard Stevens, son of Edwin, below
      - Edwin Augustus Stevens (1795–1868), the founder of Stevens Institute of Technology, m. (1) Mary Barton Picton (1806–1842) m. (2) Martha Bayard Dod (1831–1899)
        - Mary Picton Stevens (1840–1903) m. (1) Muscoe Russell Hunter Garnett (1821–1864) m. (2) Edward Parke Custis Lewis (1837–1892), U.S. Minister to Portugal.
        - John Stevens IV (1856–1895) m. Mary Marshall McGuire (1850–1905)
          - Mary Picton Stevens (1885–1915) m. Ogden Haggerty Hammond (1869–1956)
            - Mary Stevens Hammond (1908–1958) m. Count Guerino Roberti, was thereafter known as Countess Roberti.
            - Millicent Vernon Hammond (1910–1992), who served in the U.S. House of Representatives, m. Hugh McLeod Fenwick (1905–1991).
              - Mary Stevens Fenwick (1934-1987) m. Kenneth Joseph Reckford (1933 - 2021)
              - Hugo Hammond Fenwick (1937-2002)
            - Ogden H. Hammond Jr. (1912–1976) m. Marsyl Stokes.
        - Edwin Augustus Stevens, Jr. (1858–1918), m. Emily Contee Lewis (1857–1931)
            - John Stevens VI (1881–1932), who died unmarried.
            - Edwin Augustus Stevens III (1882–1954), who died unmarried.
            - Washington Lewis Stevens (1883–1946) m. Nannie Nye Jackson in 1905.
            - Bayard Stevens (1885–1927)
            - Martha Bayard Stevens (1886–1888)
            - Basil Martiau Stevens (1888–1957), m. Helen Conro Ward (1891–1943)
            - Lawrence Lewis Stevens (1889–1958) m. Anne D. Malpass (1890–1974).
            - Emily Custis Lewis Stevens (1896–1963), died unmarried.
        - Caroline Bayard Stevens (b. 1859), who married Archibald Alexander and then H. Otto Wittpenn
          - Archibald Stevens Alexander (1880–1912) m. Helen Tracy Barney (1882–1922)
            - Archibald S. Alexander (1906–1979) m. (1) Susan Dimock Tilton (1907–1935) m. (2) Jean Struthers Sears (1907–1983)
              - Archibald Stevens Alexander (1933–2016), a lawyer who taught at Rutgers Law School
        - Julia Augusta Stevens (1863-1870)
        - Robert Livingston Stevens II (b. 1864) m. Mary Stuart Whitney, great-granddaughter of Stephen Whitney
          - Robert Livingston Stevens (1907-1972) m. (1) Elizabeth Ogden Woodward (1907-1986) m. (2) Grace Vanderbilt ((1899–1964))
        - Charles Albert Stevens (1865-1901) m. Mary Madeline Brady (1866-1930)
        - Richard Stevens (1868–1919), president of the Hoboken Land and Improvement Company.
      - Elizabeth Juliana Stevens (1797–1881) m. Thomas Anderson Conover (1791–1864)
      - Mary Stevens (1799–1825), m. (1824) Rear Admiral Joshua R. Sands (1795–1883)
        - one son
      - Harriet Stevens (1801–1844), m. (1830) Rear Admiral Joshua R. Sands (1795–1883)
        - eight children
      - Esther Bowes Stevens (b. 1804)
      - Catherine Sophia Van Cortlandt Stevens (b. 1806)
    - Mary Stevens (1751–1814) m. Chancellor Robert R. Livingston (1746–1813), negotiator of the Louisiana Purchase
      - Livingston family
  - Richard Stevens (unknown)
