= Martha Bayard Stevens =

American philanthropist (1831–1899)

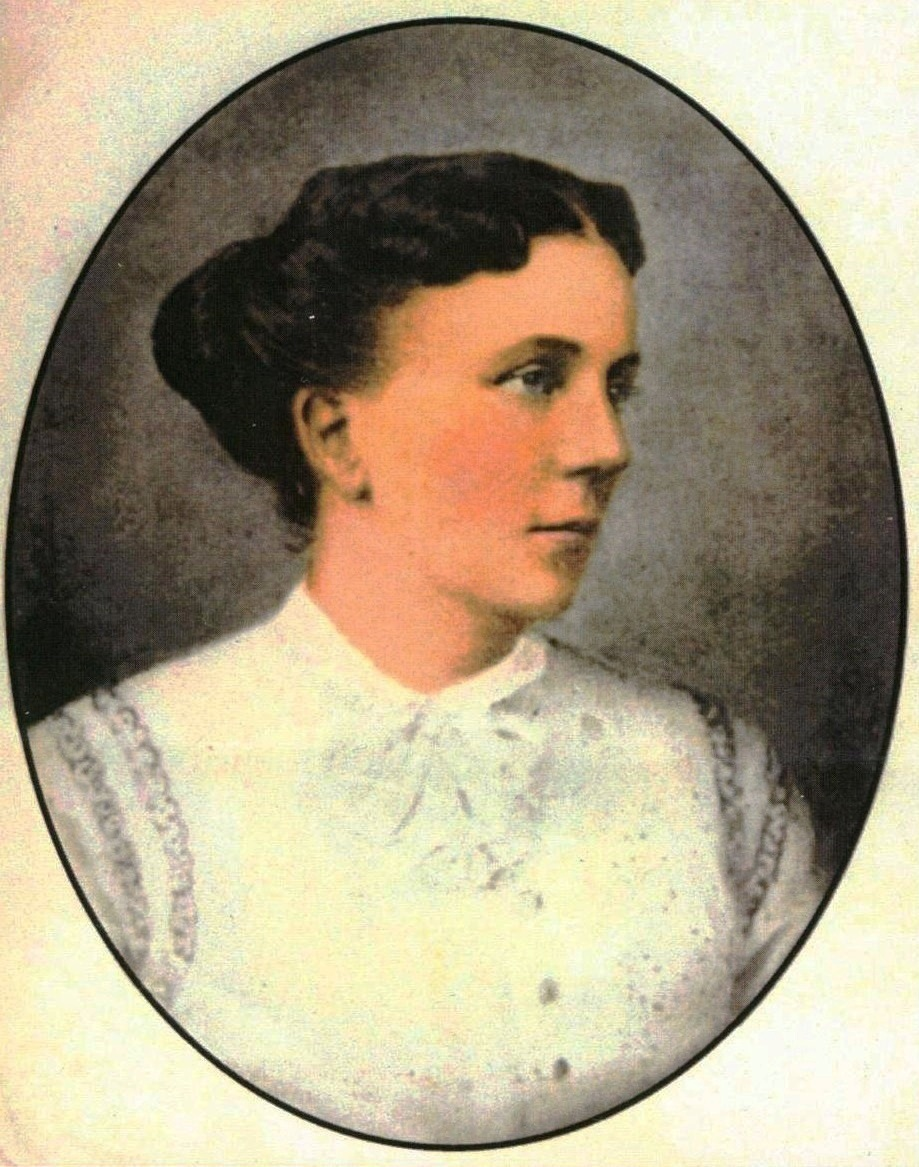
- Born: Martha Bayard Dod; May 15, 1831; Princeton, New Jersey, U.S.
- Died: April 1, 1899 (aged 67); Hoboken, New Jersey, U.S.
- Spouse: Edwin Augustus Stevens (m. 1854; died 1868)
- Children: John Stevens IV; Edwin A. Stevens, Jr; Caroline Bayard Stevens; Robert Livingston Stevens II; Charles Albert Stevens; Richard Stevens
- Parent(s): Albert Baldwin Dod; Caroline Smith Bayard
- Relatives: John Bubenheim Bayard (great-grandfather); See Stevens family

For the American politician, see Martha Stevens.

Martha Bayard Stevens (née Dod; May 15, 1831 – April 1, 1899) was a noted New Jersey philanthropist influential in advancing complementary educational pursuits.

== Early life ==
She was born to Albert Baldwin Dod (1805–1845), a professor of mathematics at Princeton University and Caroline Smith Bayard (1807–1891). Her maternal grandfather was Samuel Bayard (1766-1840) and her great-grandfather was Continental Congressman John Bubenheim Bayard (1738-1808), sharing lineage with Peter Stuyvesant.

Martha was a descendant of the Bayard family who emigrated from Holland to the United States before the Revolutionary War. The Bayards owned the greater part of the land now known as Hoboken and Weehawken, but lost after fleeing the country upon the surrender of the British Army. The land was then sold to Colonel John Stevens, father of Martha's future husband Edwin Augustus Stevens.

== Contributions to Hoboken ==
Widowed at age 37 by her husband Edwin Augustus Stevens, she had the responsibility of executing the establishment of a "school of higher learning" as per her husband's will and bequest. As a tribute to her family's curiosity and experimental ventures she chose to erect a school of engineering, Stevens Institute of Technology.

She drew upon a wide range of experiences and resources in order to further causes she believed in: education, healthy housing, and opportunities for working class women. Influenced by experiences in her own life including her own descent during childhood from middle-class comfort into single-parent poverty; her subsequent re-emergence into wealth through marriage; her active participation and acumen in overseeing the business affairs of the Hoboken Land & Improvement Company, a Stevens family business; her role as a founding and lifetime trustee of Stevens Institute of Technology. She used the inheritance of money and land from her late husband, Edwin Augustus Stevens liberally in pursuit of these causes.

Martha Stevens played a major role in conceiving, establishing, promoting and financing a range of social-service organizations in Hoboken. Her husband died in 1868 and Martha Stevens channeled her grief, energy and inheritance into support for the working poor by addressing basic life needs and underwriting education, Christian teachings and moral instruction.

Martha Stevens was instrumental in the founding of the Church of the Holy Innocents as a free Episcopal church, a foundling hospital and birthing center at St Mary's Hospital; the Robert L. Stevens Fund for Municipal Research; manual training schools for both boys and young girls in Hoboken; the Hoboken Public Library and Manual Training School.

Stevens is credited by the borough of Sea Bright, New Jersey, with having been the person who suggested the borough's name.

== Personal life ==
On August 22, 1854, Martha became the second wife of Edwin Augustus Stevens, the son of Colonel John Stevens III (1749-1838) and his wife Rachel Cox (1761-1839). He was the sixth of eleven children, and among his older brothers were John Cox Stevens and Robert Livingston Stevens.

With Edwin she had seven children:

- John Stevens IV (b. July 1856), grandfather of Millicent Fenwick
- Edwin Augustus Stevens, Jr. (b. March 14, 1858)
- Caroline Bayard Stevens (b. November 21, 1859), who married Archibald Alexander and then H. Otto Wittpenn
- Julia Augusta Stevens (b. May 18, 1863)
- Robert Livingston Stevens II (b. August 26, 1864)
- Charles Albert Stevens (b. December 14, 1865)
- Richard Stevens (b. May 1868).

Her husband Edwin died in Paris, France, in 1868. She died on April 1, 1899, aged 67, in Hoboken, New Jersey.
