= Bayard family =

American family

Bayard
- Arms: A chevron between 3 escallops Crest: A demi-horse, argent Motto: Amor honor et justitia.
- Current region: United States
- Connected families: Stuyvesant family Schuyler family Van Rensselaer family Van Cortlandt family Stevens family

The Bayard family has been a prominent family of lawyers and politicians throughout American history, primarily from Wilmington, Delaware. Beginning as Federalists, they joined the party of Andrew Jackson and remained leaders of the Democratic Party into the 20th century. Counting Richard Bassett, the father-in-law of James A. Bayard Sr., the family provided six generations of U.S. senators from Delaware, serving from 1789 until 1929.

== History ==
Ann Stuyvesant Bayard, widowed wife of the French Huguenot Samuel Bayard, came to New Netherland with her brother, Director-General Peter Stuyvesant in 1647. Her grandson, another Samuel Bayard, went to Bohemia Manor, Maryland, in 1698. His grandson was John Bubenheim Bayard (1738–1808), Continental Congressman from Pennsylvania, and his great-grandson, John Bayard's nephew, was James A. Bayard Sr., the first Bayard in the U.S. Senate.

== Family members ==
- Judith Bayard (c. 1615–1687), m. Peter Stuyvesant, Director-General of New Netherland
- Samuel Bayard (c. 1615–c. 1647), m. 1638, Anna Stuyvesant, sister of Peter Stuyvesant; to New Amsterdam 1647
- Nicholas Bayard (c. 1644–1707), m. Judith Varleth, 16th Mayor of New York City, nephew of Peter Stuyvesant
- Samuel Bayard (1669–1746), m. Margaretta Van Cortlandt (1674–1719), a Judge
- Stephen Bayard (1700–1757), m. Alida Vetch (b. 1705), 39th Mayor of New York City
- William Bayard (1729–1804), m. Catharine McEvers (1732–1814), delegate to the 1765 Stamp Act Congress and loyalist in the Revolutionary War
- Col. John Bubenheim Bayard (1738–1808), Continental Congressman from Pennsylvania, to Philadelphia 1755, m. Margaret Hodge, daughter of Andrew Hodge and Margaret McCulloch
- Samuel Bayard (1757-1832)
- Mary Bayard (1760–1806), m. 1788, William Houstoun (c. 1755–1813), delegate to the Continental Congress and the United States Constitutional Convention and whose name was given to Houston Street in Manhattan
- William Bayard Jr. (1761–1826), m. Elizabeth Cornell (d. 1854), New York City banker, friend to Alexander Hamilton
- Samuel Bayard (1767–1840), lawyer and judge
- James A. Bayard Sr. (1767–1815), U.S. Senator from Delaware, m. Ann Bassett, daughter of Richard Bassett, U.S. Senator
- Jane Bayard (1772–1851), m. Andrew Kirkpatrick (1756–1831), Chief Justice of the New Jersey Supreme Court
- Margaret Bayard Smith (1778–1844), m. Samuel Harrison Smith
- Richard Henry Bayard (1796–1868), U.S. Senator from Delaware, 1st Mayor of Wilmington, Delaware
- James Asheton Bayard Jr. (1799–1880), U.S. Senator from Delaware
- Edward Bayard (1806–1889), m. Tryphena Cady (1804–1891), daughter of Judge Daniel Cady and sister of Elizabeth Cady Stanton. (Edward Bayard attended Union College in Schenectady, New York, and studied law under his father-in-law, Daniel Cady.)
- Caroline Smith Bayard (1807–1891), m. Albert Baldwin Dod (1805–1845), professor of mathematics at Princeton University
- Thomas Francis Bayard Sr. (1828–1898), U.S. Senator from Delaware
- Martha Bayard Dod (1831–1899), m. Edwin Augustus Stevens (1795–1868), founder of Stevens Institute of Technology
- Mabel Bayard Warren (1861–1920), married Boston attorney Samuel D. Warren
- Florence Bayard Hilles (1865–1954), Delaware suffragist
- Thomas Francis Bayard Jr. (1868–1942), U.S. Senator from Delaware, m. Elizabeth Bradford du Pont, daughter of Alexis I. du Pont
- Alexis Irénée du Pont "Lex" Bayard (1918–1985), Lieutenant Governor of Delaware
