= Archibald Alexander (disambiguation) =

Archibald Alexander (1772–1851) was an American Presbyterian theologian.

Archibald Alexander may also refer to:

- Archibald S. Alexander (1906–1979), American lawyer, civil servant, and Democratic politician
- Archibald Alexander (politician) (1755–1822), American physician and politician
- Archie Alexander (Archibald Alphonso Alexander, 1888–1958), design and construction engineer
- Archibald Stevens Alexander (1880–1912), lawyer, politician, and military aide to Woodrow Wilson
