= Phoenix (steamboat) =

Phoenix was a sidewheel steamboat built in 1807 by John Stevens and his son, Robert L. Stevens, at Hoboken, New Jersey.

Phoenix measured 50 feet (15 m) long, 12 feet (3.7 m) wide and 7 feet (2.1 m) deep. She had 25 cabin berths and additional 12 berths in steerage.

Originally built to sail from New Brunswick, New Jersey, to New York City, Phoenix became the first steamboat to sail the open ocean, from New York to Philadelphia, in June 1809. The reason for this journey was that the restrictions placed on Stevens by the New York steamboat monopoly held by Robert Fulton and Robert Livingston meant that he could not operate profitably. Stevens decided to risk a journey over the open ocean so that he could operate on the Delaware River.

The journey was hazardous, and a schooner accompanying Phoenix was driven off by a storm. Phoenix made harbor at Barnegat, New Jersey, and after waiting several days for the storm to subside, eventually sailed around New Jersey and up the Delaware River.

Following the journey, Phoenix made her first trip on the Delaware between Philadelphia and Trenton, on July 5, 1809.
