= Landmarks of Hoboken, New Jersey =

Hoboken, New Jersey, is home to many parks, historical landmarks, and other places of interest.

== Landmarks ==
=== Carlo's Bakery ===
A famous bakery and setting for the TLC reality television series Cake Boss. It is located on Washington Street, across from City Hall.

=== Castle Point ===
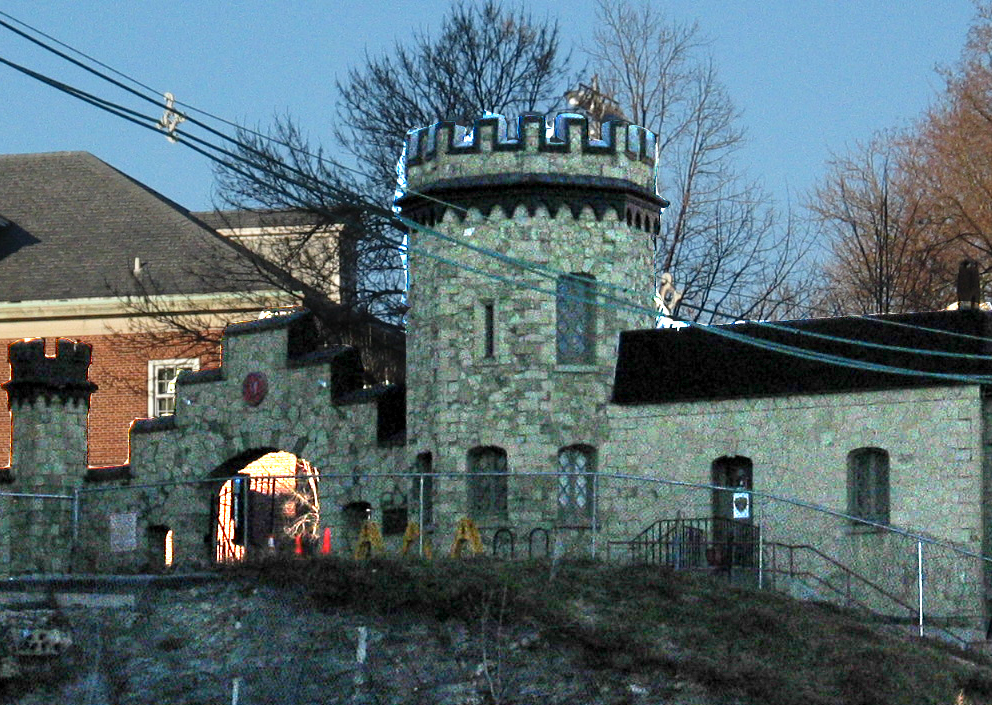
Castle Gatehouse at Stevens Institute of Technology

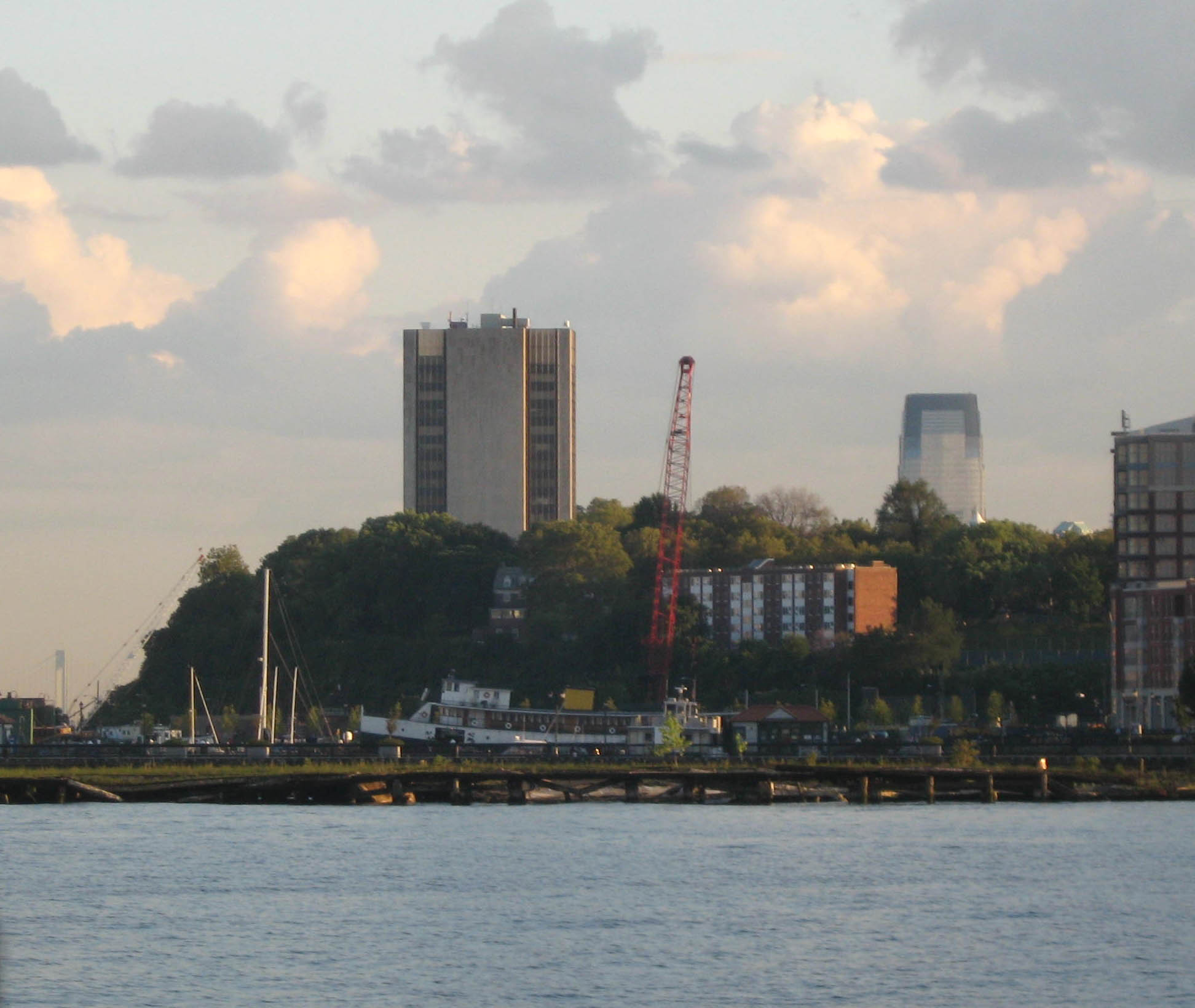
North side

Castle Point is the highest point in Hoboken. The name is a corruption of "Castille Point", due to its supposed resemblance to the Castilian coast. To early navigators, the high serpentine crag jutting over the river reminded them of a miniature Rock of Gibraltar. The land was bought at public auction in 1804 by Col. John Stevens, who built his estate there. After his death, his son Edwin Augustus Stevens took responsibility of the estate and in 1853 built a 40-room mansion, the "Stevens Castle", on land adjacent to the point. It was acquired by Stevens Institute of Technology in 1910 and served as an administrative and residential building until 1959. Castle Point is still part of the Stevens campus. It overlooks Sybil's Cave.

Castle Point also includes the surrounding area and streets such as the yellow brick Castle Point Terrace. Castle Point Park and Castle Point Skate Park are at the base of Castle Point, next to the Hudson River.

=== Clam Broth House ===
The Clam Broth House (1899–2004), was a landmark Hoboken restaurant that operated for over a century.

The Clam Broth House opened in 1899. The restaurant attracted attention with several giant hand-shaped signs. There were two giant hand-shaped signs, one hanging on the outside of the Clam Broth House that pointed downward towards the entrance, and one on a neighboring building (which is the only sign still there today). In addition, there was a third, smaller hand-shaped sign.

In 2004, the Clam Broth House building was condemned by city officials because of structural failures caused by construction workers, and destroyed. There were cracks and bulges in the building's façade prior to the building's destruction, and the facade also buckled in May 2003, causing it to be shut down.

The Clam Broth House reopened in 2010, but was bought in 2012 by another restaurant, Biggie's Clam Bar.

=== DeBaun Auditorium ===
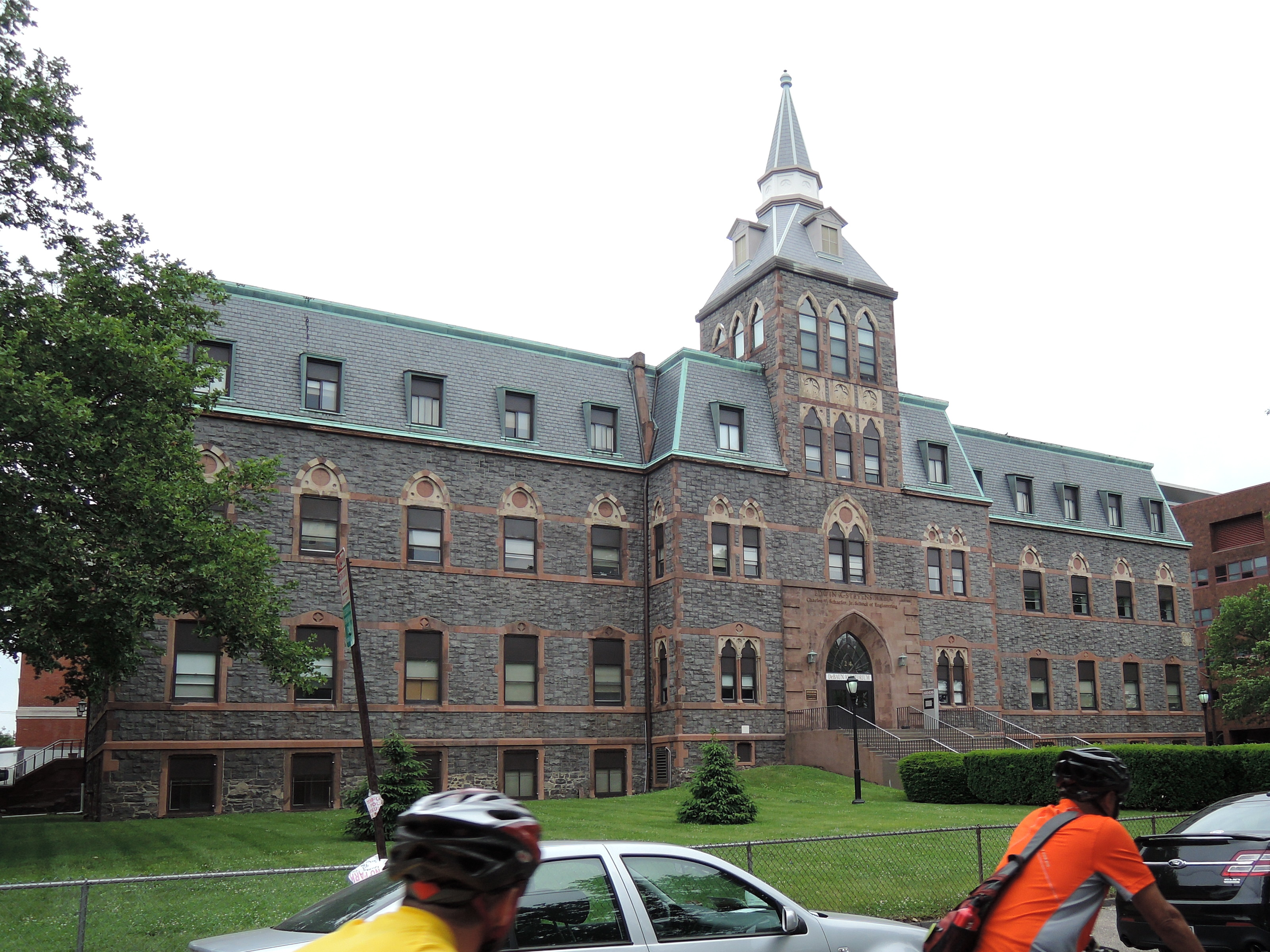
Stevens Hall

In Edwin A. Stevens Hall on 5th Street opposite Stevens Park.

=== Hoboken Free Public Library ===
At Church Square Park, the Hoboken Public Library contains a collection of historical photos and publications related to the history and culture of Hoboken. Erected with funds from philanthropist Martha Bayard Stevens in 1896.

=== Hoboken Historical Museum ===
The Hoboken Historical Museum was founded in 1986 and moved into its current location at 1301 Hudson St. in 2001. It presents displays on the city's history as well as exhibits of local artists' work. Its current location was once the W. & A. Fletcher Company machine shop, a hub of the city's 19th century shipbuilding and repair industry.

=== Hoboken Projects ===
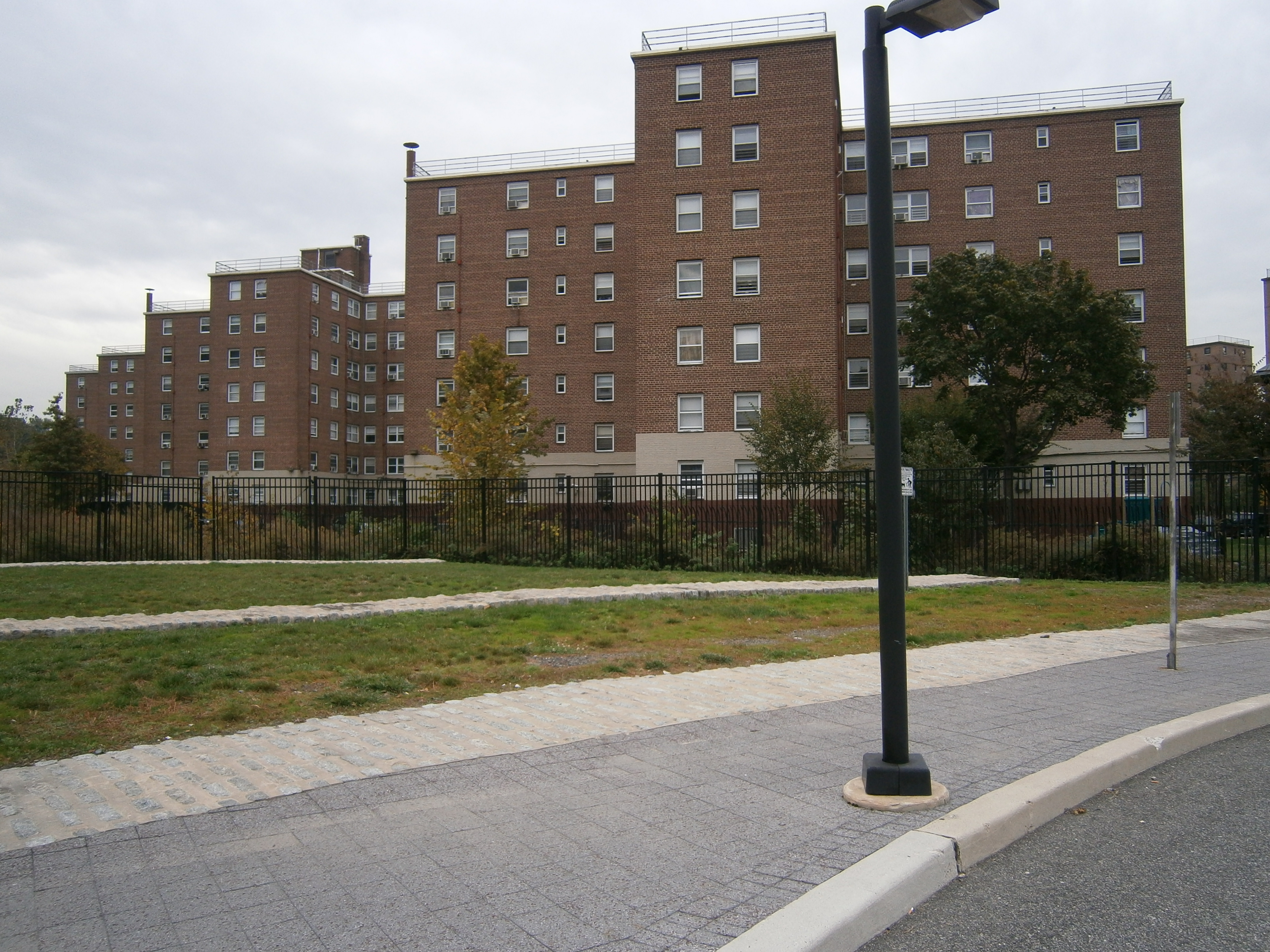
Hoboken Projects at 2nd Street Station

The Hoboken Projects are a complex of low-income apartments on the south western side of Hoboken, built in 1949 by the Hoboken Housing Authority.

=== Hoboken Terminal ===
Hoboken Terminal, also known as Lackawanna Station (named for the Native American tribe that formerly made the area their dwelling), at the city's southeast corner, is a major transportation hub and a national historic landmark was built in 1907.

=== Hudson River Waterfront Walkway ===
The Hudson River Waterfront Walkway is a promenade along the Hudson River.

=== Hudson Tea Building ===
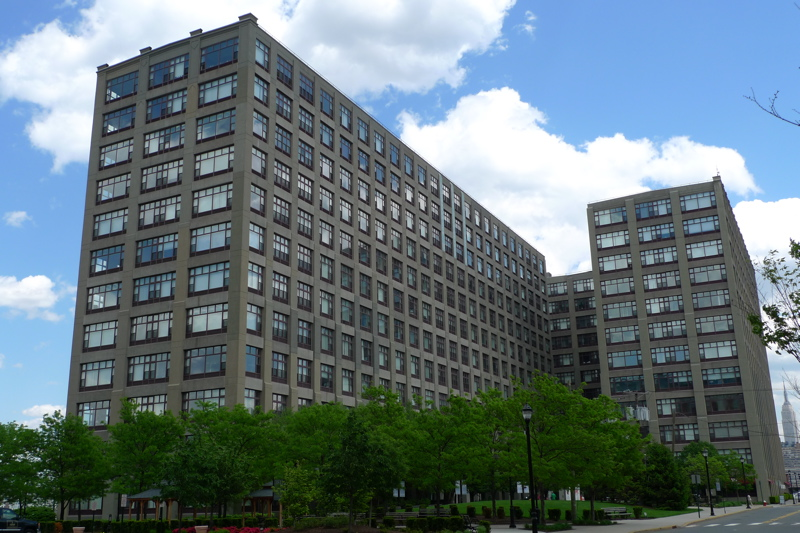
Hudson Tea Building

The Hudson Tea Building apartment complex (1500 Washington and 1500 Hudson Streets) is the site of a former Lipton Tea plant. The part of the Hudson River Waterfront Walkway which opened in 2004 forms a "C" shape around the west, north and east sides of buildings at the Hudson Weehawken Cove. Although places are farther north and east than the northeastern most point in Hoboken is found here. It is the home of former New Jersey Governor Jon Corzine, New York Giants quarterback Eli Manning and was used as a residence by actress Mischa Barton when she filmed the 2009 film Assassination of a High School President in nearby Bayonne. In 2016 Hudson Tea opened a series of new buildings, designed by DeWitt Tishman Architects with interiors by Andres Escobar (designer).

=== Miracle statue ===
On July 29, 2005, a claim was made that a miniature statue of Jesus opened one of its eyes on its own. Before July 29, its eyes were shut. The statue is a part of a shrine at the corner of Jackson Street and Third Street that is taken care of by Julio Dones, a partially blind man who says he noticed one of its eyes was open while he was cleaning it. He claims that it is a miracle, while others believe it was a hoax. Some believe that there were already eyes in the statue, and that eyelids were glued on and one of them fell off. Regardless of how it happened, the incident gained publicity quickly. On July 29, 2005, two local news stations, ABC and UPN, came to the shrine to report it live and interview people. It has since been called "The Miracle Statue".

=== Marine View Plaza ===
Marine View Plaza is a building complex made up of two 25-story Brutalist style buildings, constructed in 1975. These two buildings are the 2nd tallest buildings in Hoboken, New Jersey at 240.5 feet. 1 Marine View Plaza is the northernmost and 2 Marine View Plaza is the southernmost. Both buildings are 432-unit rental apartments with roof-deck swimming pools. The complex is bordered on the west by Hudson Street, on the north by 4th Street, on the east by River Street and on the south by 3rd Street.

As well as having two 25-story buildings, the Marine View Plaza complex also has a smaller building called 5 Marine View Plaza. It once housed Hoboken's only movie theater, which closed in 2005 and been replaced by a bank.

=== Stevens Institute of Technology ===
The university is situated overlooking the Hudson.

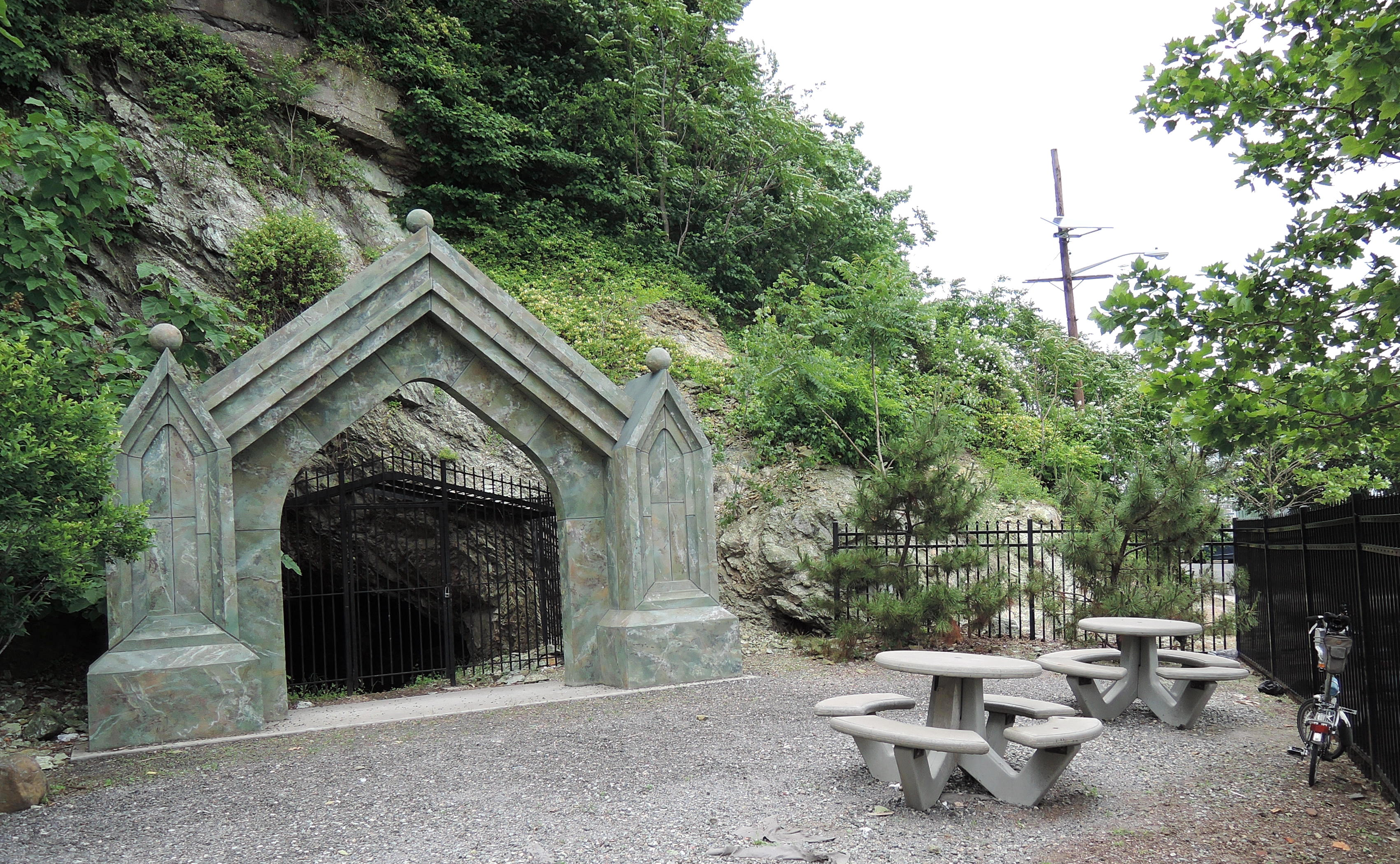
Sybil's Cave in 2013

=== Sybil's Cave ===
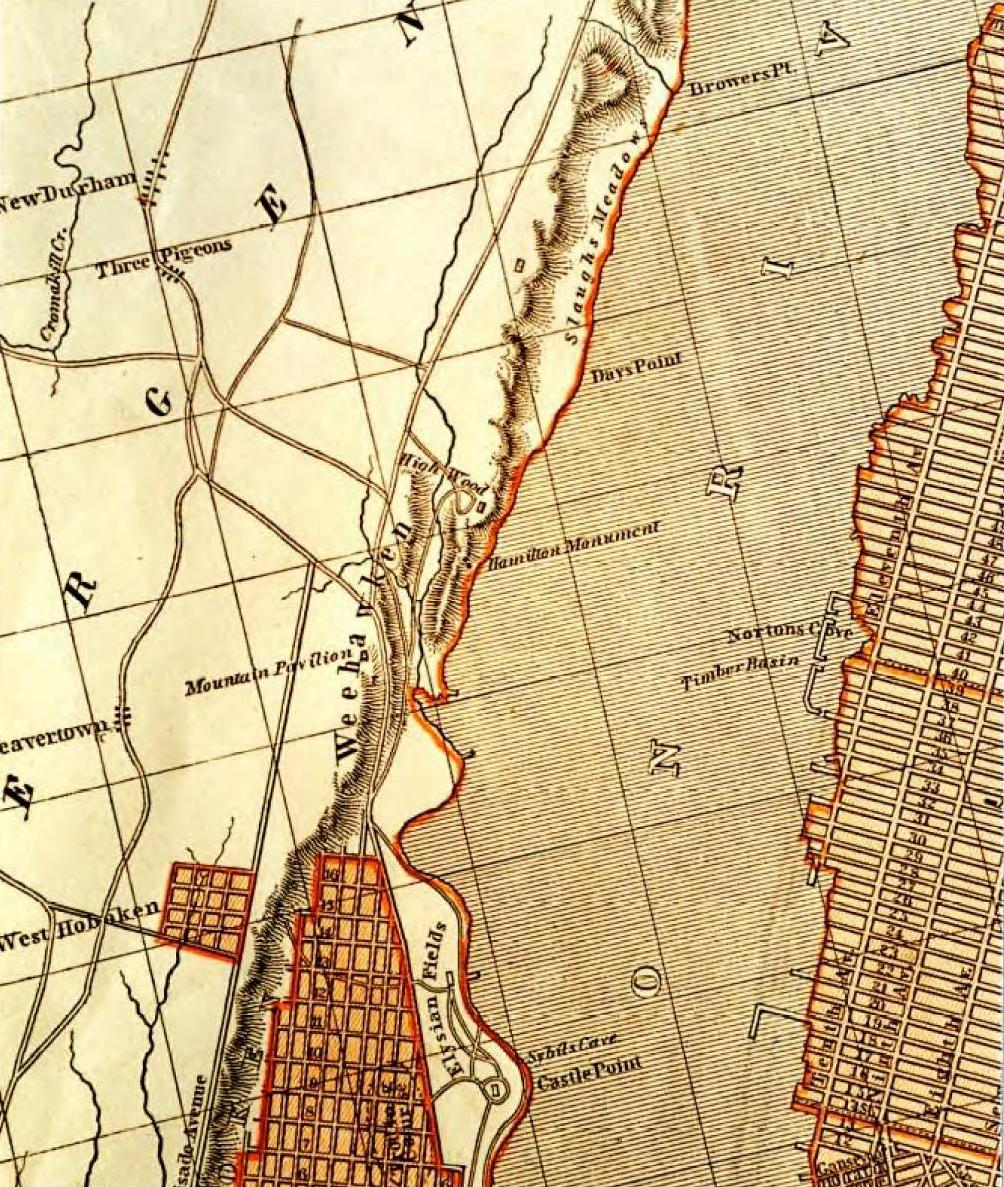
1841 map showing the location of Sybil's Cave at Castle Point

Sybil's Cave is a cave with a natural water spring, that is now buried at the bottom of the Stevens Institute of Technology hill, near the Castle Point Skate Park on Frank Sinatra Drive. One of Hoboken's best known landmarks, it was first excavated around 1832 by Hoboken's founder, Col. John Stevens III, and adorned with a gothic-style stone arch. Named after the ancient Greco-Roman prophetesses, it was originally Hoboken's biggest tourist attraction, for the magnesium-laced water that flows from the spring.

The cave gained national attention in 1841 when the body of a young cigar shop worker, Mary Cecilia Rogers, washed ashore nearby, an incident that inspired Edgar Allan Poe's The Mystery of Marie Rogêt, one of the first true-crime detective novels. From the mid-to-late-1800s, thousands of glasses were sold daily for a penny each to tourists from New York, who drank the cave's water in the belief that it had therapeutic properties. The cave was closed in 1880 due to health department concerns about water quality, and it was used as a cool storage locker for a nearby eating establishment. That establishment devolved into a seedy waterfront tavern and closed in the 1930s, when the cave was filled in with concrete and dirt.

Around the time of World War I the cave fell into disuse and was sealed. It was reopened in October 2008 after former Mayor David Roberts worked with the Hoboken Historical Museum, Hoboken Brownstone company and others on a $106,752 renovation project to unblock the cave and make it accessible to the public.

Today, although the exterior gate to the park is usually open 24 hours a day, the gate to the cave itself is locked, as its water was found to contain too many impurities to be drinkable, and the interior is rocky and slippery. As of December 2018, there are no plans to reopen it.

=== Weehawken Cove ===
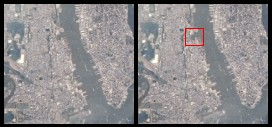
Image of Weehawken Cove/North Hoboken Harbor taken by NASA. (Image on the right with red line shows where it is.)

Weehawken Cove is a small cove that extends westward from the Hudson River. The cove straddles the boundary between Hoboken to the south and Weehawken to the north. Explorer Henry Hudson anchored his ship there on October 2, 1609. His first mate noted that Castle Point looked as if it contained silver mines.

=== United Synagogue of Hoboken ===
Listed on the National Register of Historic Places, the United Synagogue of Hoboken is among the oldest synagogue buildings in New Jersey.

== Parks ==
=== Castle Point Park ===
Castle Point Park is a public park consisting of a walkway along the Hudson River, offering scenic views of Manhattan. Stretching north along the river from Frank Sinatra Park, it terminates near 10th Street, with Sinatra Drive following along its length. Castle Point Park runs past the bottom of Castle Point, home to the Stevens Institute of Technology. Historic Sybil's Cave is also visible from the park.

Within the park is the Castle Point Skate Park, Hoboken's only designated skateboarding area. It features many ramps: one small half-pipe, one large half-pipe, one quarter pipe, and one 45° ramp, as well as several smaller ramps.

=== Church Square Park ===
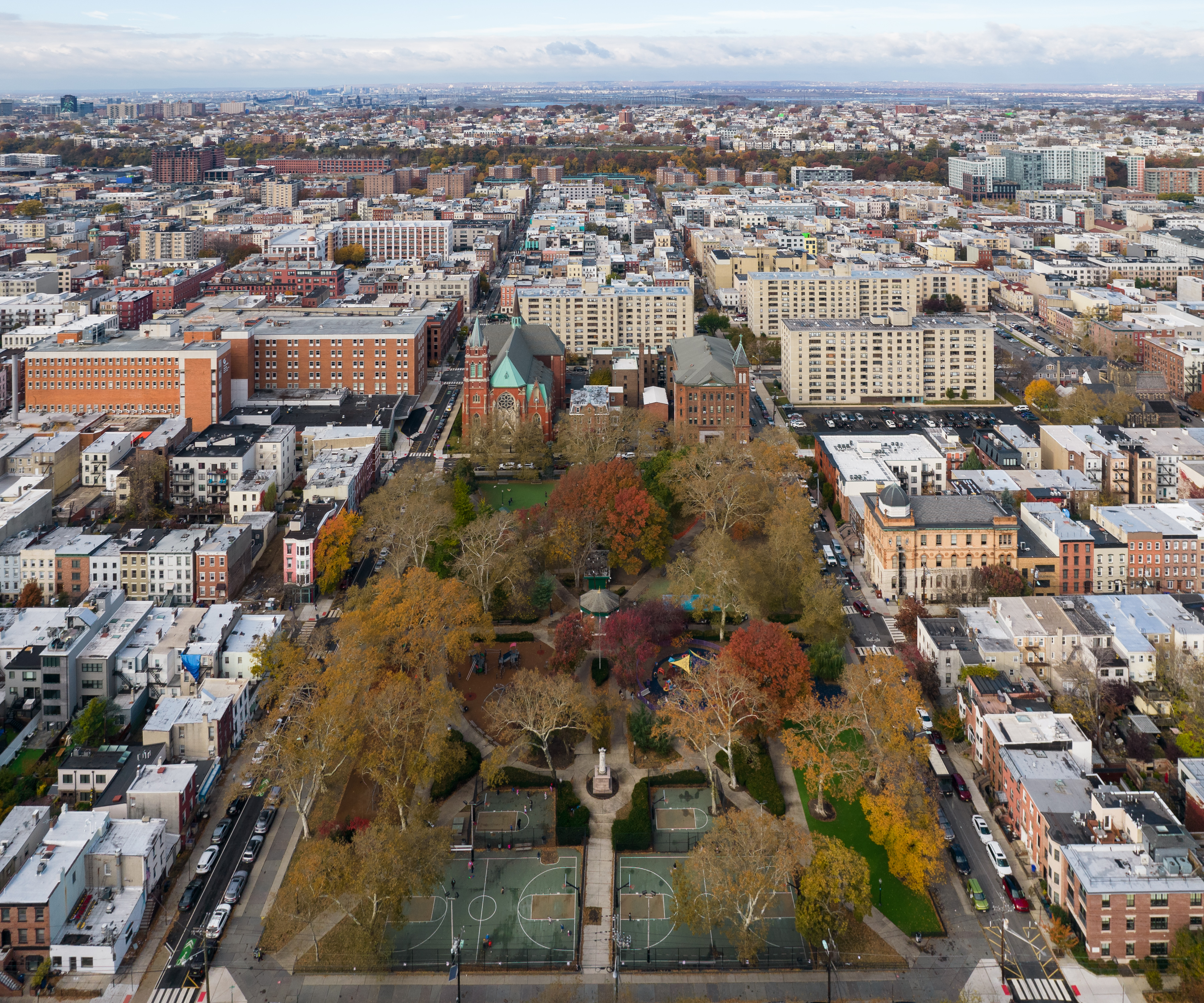
Aerial view of Church Square Park

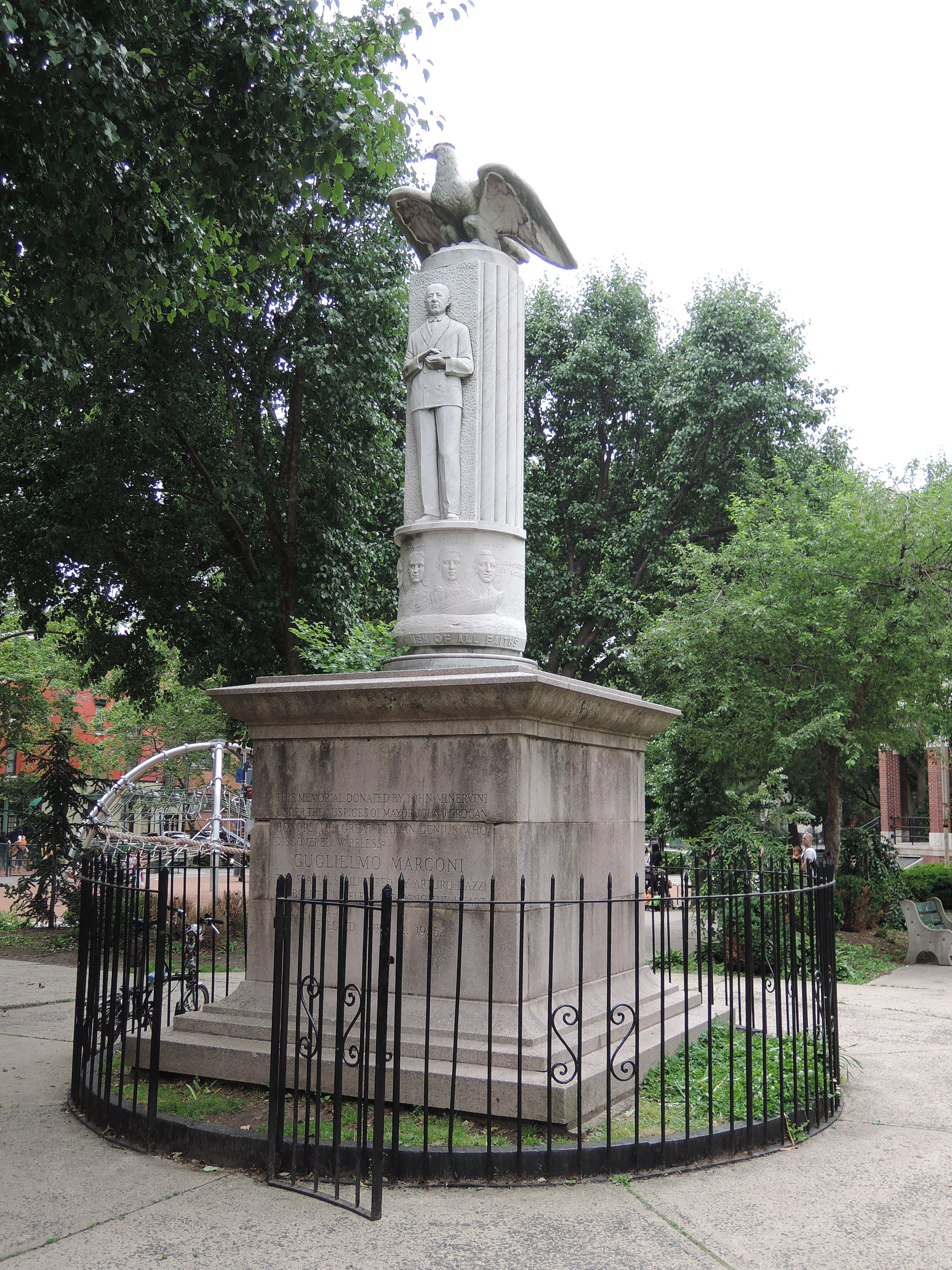
Guglielmo Marconi Monument

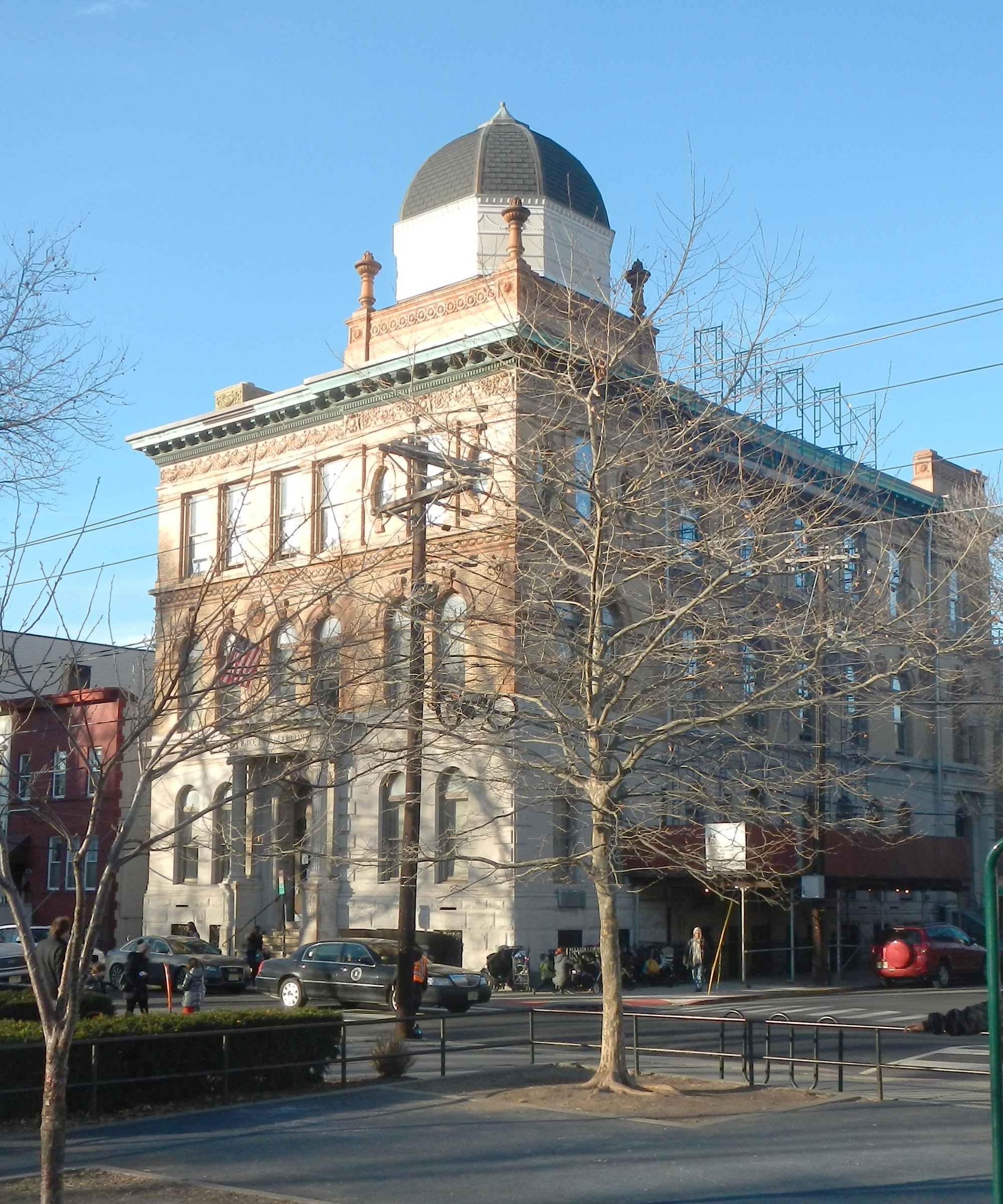
Hoboken Public Library

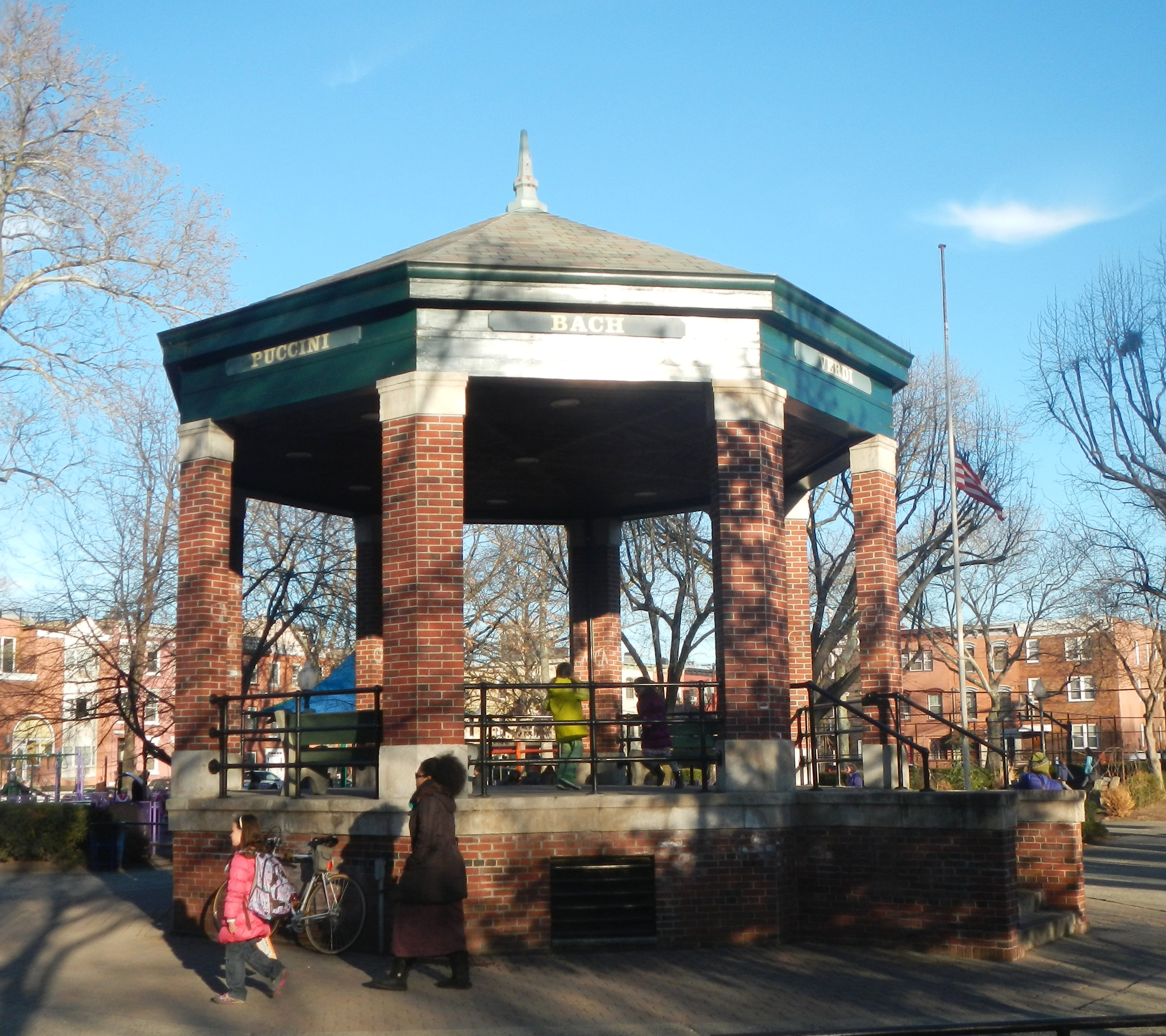
Church Square Park Gazebo

Church Square Park is bordered between Fourth and Fifth Streets and between Willow Avenue and Garden Street, was originally dedicated as a "Public Square" by John Stevens, the founder of Hoboken, in 1804.

In the eastern part of the park is a statue, sculptured by Arturo Dazzi. of the radio pioneer Guglielmo Marconi, with a bas-relief tribute to the Four Chaplains, who sacrificed their lives, going down with their ship, the U.S.S. Dorchester, during World War II. The statue was commissioned and donated by John Minervini and replaced the damaged (in transit) Italian 1939 World's Fair Marconi statue received from the Italian government. Since the original pedestal was too large for the present monument, Mr. Minervini added the four chaplains at the request of Mayor John Grogan.

The Firemen's Monument, Hoboken is a statue of a fireman, in the western part of the park.

Covering two square blocks, this popular park is often a hub of community activity. With four separate playground areas (including a gated infant playground and a gated toddler playground), a sprinkler area turned on in the summer, basketball courts, ping pong tables, chess tables, a covered gazebo, an astroturf area and plenty of grassy areas.

=== Columbus Park ===
Columbus Park is a park near Hoboken High School at the corner of 9th Street and Clinton Street originally designed by Charles N. Lowrie, who was a landscape architect for the Hudson County Park System, of which the park is a part. There is a statue of Christopher Columbus in the center of the park. There is also a memorial dedicated to John A. Sacci, a beloved Hoboken High School History teacher, who was tragically shot on February 12, 1998. The monument was facilitated by students and to this day, the word "remembrance" is misspelled on the marble monument.

Columbus Park is home to multiple athletic courts, including a multi-use with a half basketball court, three lighted tennis courts, bocce courts, a shuffleboard court, and a hitting wall. There are two playgrounds and a spray park. The playground closest to 9th Street was dedicated in 2002 to the memory of Deborah Lynn Williams, a Hoboken mother killed at the World Trade Center during the September 11 attacks.

=== Frank Sinatra Park ===
Frank Sinatra Park is a park near Pier A, offering views of Manhattan. Built in 1998, it honors Frank Sinatra, who was born in Hoboken. Sinatra Park is shaped in a Roman amphitheater style with an area that faces the former site of the World Trade Center. The Statue of Frank Sinatra was installed in 2021. The Hoboken Division of Cultural Affairs regularly produces events at the park such as their Thursday concerts featuring a variety of New Jersey–based and regional musical acts and "Shakespeare Mondays" present by the Hudson Shakespeare Company. Other attractions include a soccer field.

On August 24, 2004, CNN broadcast live episodes of Inside Politics and Crossfire from the park.

=== Gateway Park ===
Gateway Park is an official yet secluded park that was created in 2000 to help make the neighborhood more scenic. The park itself has trees, grass, and a bird feeder. There is an official sign at the park that says "Your Park", although it does not say "Gateway Park" yet. The park, triangle-shaped and about the size of a gas station, is Hoboken's smallest park.

Gateway Park is on the southwest corner of Hoboken, bordered to the south by the train tracks that separate Hoboken from Jersey City. To the east is an abandoned building (the Windsor Wax Company). The park also borders Newark Street and is at the intersection of Newark Street and Jackson Street. On two of the three sides the park is lined with pine trees.

=== Jackson Street Park ===
Jackson Street Park located at 102 Jackson Street, is a young children's play park built within the shell of the city's old Public Works garage. It was fully renovated in the 2012 with new play equipment, soft surfacing. a water spray for summer use and a rock climbing wall.

=== Madison Park ===
Madison Park (also called Madison Street Park) is at the corner of 3rd Street and Madison Street. There's a large abstract painting on the building that faces it. The park was overhauled in 2019 and includes brand new park equipment, including two new sections of playground equipment for children of different ages. It also includes an upgraded spray feature, swing set, climbing net, shade structure, additional benches, and bathroom.

=== Pier A Park ===
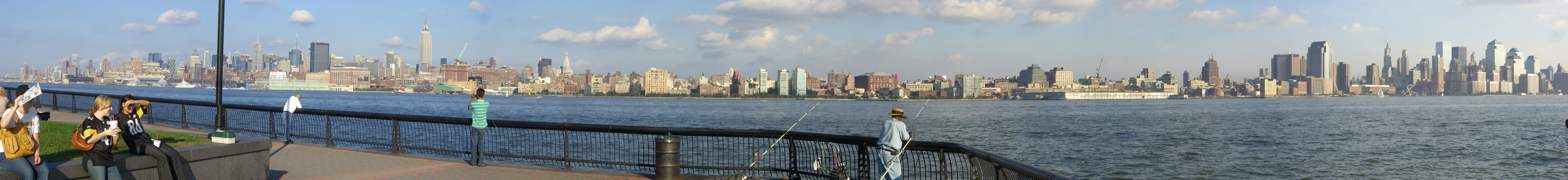
Panorama of Manhattan from Pier A

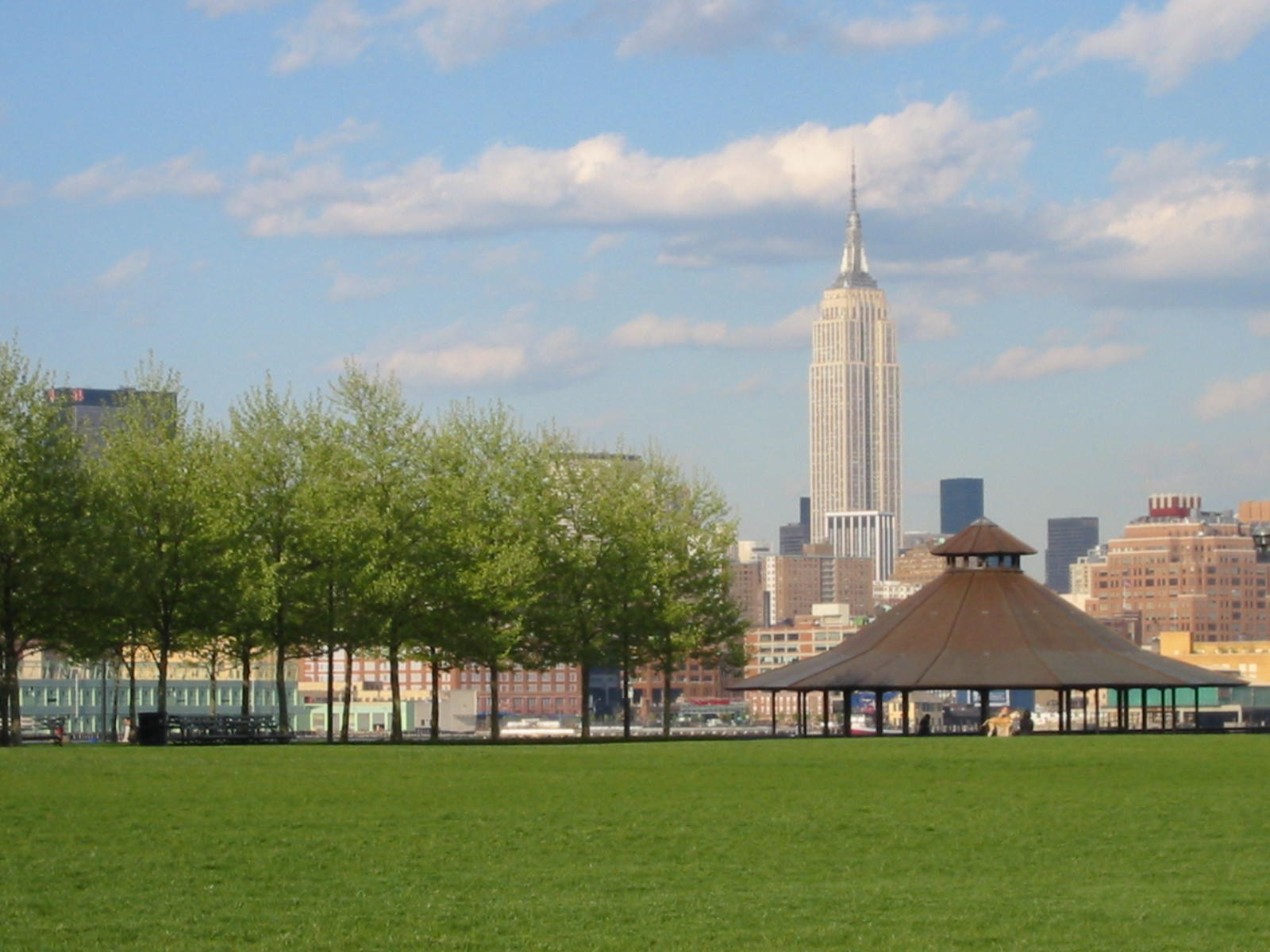
Pier A's grass field and gazebo, with Manhattan in the background.

Pier A Park was originally used as a pier for ships and was recrafted as a park in 1999. It extends from the southern end of Hoboken (just north of the Hoboken Terminal) east into the Hudson River, with a view of the entire Manhattan skyline. At this point, the Hudson River starts to be affected by the tides in New York Bay. Pier A has a water-jet fountain, bike paths, rows of trees (some of them transplanted in maturity), a big field, a fishing area (with water pumps and cutting boards) and a gazebo at its eastern extremity. It is an example of good civic design, particularly the grass field which is firm and natural-looking though its sod is layered atop concrete. In 2006, the Urban Land Institute named Pier A Park one of the top 10 urban parks in the Nation.

Since Pier A is the nearest park to downtown Hoboken. At lunchtime on weekdays, many office workers take the time to stroll on the pier. On hot, summer weekends, the grassy field is swarming with sun worshippers. In warm weather, movies are shown on the pier at night, against the blazing Manhattan skyline rising behind the screen. On one Saturday during the summer, a town fair is held on Pier A, including music, craft shops and rides for the kids. Hoboken also has its Fourth of July celebrations on Pier A.

The park has also been a performance venue. The most notable concerts were the Mumford & Sons concert of 2012, and the Americanarama Festival in 2013 which featured performances from Bob Dylan and My Morning Jacket.

Many people witnessed the September 11 attacks from Pier A because it had good views of the World Trade Center. On March 11, 2002, a memorial service was held on Pier A. On September 11, 2002, a section of land was created as a memorial for the September 11 attack victims by planting trees. In 2017, 56 glass panels, one for each Hoboken resident that perished, was erected by the trees.

=== ResilienCity Park ===
ResilienCity Park is between Madison and Adams Streets, from 12th to 13th Streets. The park was opened to the public in June 2023 on a former industrial site in Northwest Hoboken. The park contains a number of amenities, including a large lawn, athletic fields, a basketball court, and a children's play area. It also contains more than 2 million gallons of stormwater retention, and was funded in part by the Rebuild by Design project in response to flooding caused by Hurricane Sandy. It is the largest resiliency park in New Jersey.

=== Stevens Park & Little League Field ===
Stevens Park & Little League Field is between Hudson Street and Sinatra Drive, from 4th to 5th Streets. Originally Hudson Square, the park was renamed in 1955 in honor of the Stevens family who donated the land.

There is also an exposed section of serpentine rock in the southern portion of the park. In the central section of the park is a dog run. Also, in the western part of the park are two Dahlgren guns (from the USS Portsmouth) facing west towards the St. Peter & Paul Church's cafeteria.

=== Elysian Park ===
Elysian Park is a small park in Hoboken that is the last remnant of the Elysian Fields. Located on Hudson Street, between 9th and 11th Street, Elysian Park has two play areas, a basketball court, a sprinkler, a dog run and rest rooms. The northern end of prestigious Castle Point Terrace ends at the park. Part of the 1954 film On The Waterfront was filmed there.

== See also ==
- National Register of Historic Places listings in Hudson County, New Jersey
