= Caroline Bayard Stevens Wittpenn =

American social reformer (1859–1932)

- Born: November 21, 1859; Hoboken, New Jersey, U.S.
- Died: December 4, 1932 (aged 73); Hoboken, New Jersey, U.S.
- Occupations: Social reformer, welfare worker
- Spouses: Archibald Alexander (m. 1879; div. 1895); H. Otto Wittpenn (m. 1915)
- Children: Archibald Stevens Alexander
- Relatives: See Stevens Family

Caroline Bayard Stevens Wittpenn (November 21, 1859 – December 4, 1932) was a social reformer and welfare worker from Hoboken, New Jersey. She directed several welfare organizations in New Jersey in the early twentieth century, and she worked within the state's government to promote welfare-related causes. She also campaigned to establish Clinton Farms Reformatory, the first dedicated women's prison in New Jersey, and led its board of managers for nearly twenty years.

== Early life ==
Wittpenn was born at Castle Point, her family's Hoboken estate, on November 21, 1859. At the time, the Stevens family was influential in New Jersey business and politics; her grandfather John Stevens invented an early steam locomotive design and served as New Jersey's state treasurer, and her father and uncles managed the Camden & Amboy Railroad. She received a private education, which included spending time at the Bonchurch school on the Isle of Wight in England. She married Archibald Alexander, a philosophy professor at Columbia University, in 1879, and had a son, Archibald Stevens Alexander, with him the following year. The couple divorced in 1895.

== Career ==
After her divorce, Wittpenn became a probation officer working with female offenders in the Hudson County court system. Her work with impoverished women and girls inspired her to pursue welfare reform, and she began movements to overhaul the State Charities Aid Association and provide better living conditions for children in almshouses. Much of her early work involved New Jersey's criminal justice system, as she campaigned to create a juvenile court system and a separate state prison for women. Her work led to the creation of Clinton Farms Reformatory in 1913, and she served as the president of its board of managers until her death.

Her son Archibald was a member of the New Jersey Assembly in the 1900s, and both Archibald and Caroline became close to Woodrow Wilson. Caroline advised Wilson on welfare issues during his two-year term as New Jersey governor, and she became the first woman from New Jersey on the Democratic National Committee after he was elected president.

Wittpenn led and served on several welfare organizations in New Jersey during her later career. She became a board member of the New Jersey Department of Institutions and Agencies, which was responsible for many of the state's welfare programs, in 1918, and remained on the board for most of her lifetime. She also served as president of the state Board of Children's Guardians and of the New Jersey Conference of Social Welfare. In 1929, Herbert Hoover appointed her to serve on the International Prison Commission.

== Personal life ==
Wittpenn married H. Otto Wittpenn, the mayor of Jersey City and a Democratic candidate for governor, on January 6, 1915. In keeping with her Episcopal faith and common practices of the time, she waited for her bishop to presume her first husband dead before remarrying. The two remained married until her husband's death in 1931. Caroline died of pneumonia on December 4 of the following year at Castle Point.
