= Robert L. Stevens =

American inventor and businessman (1787–1856)

Robert Livingston Stevens
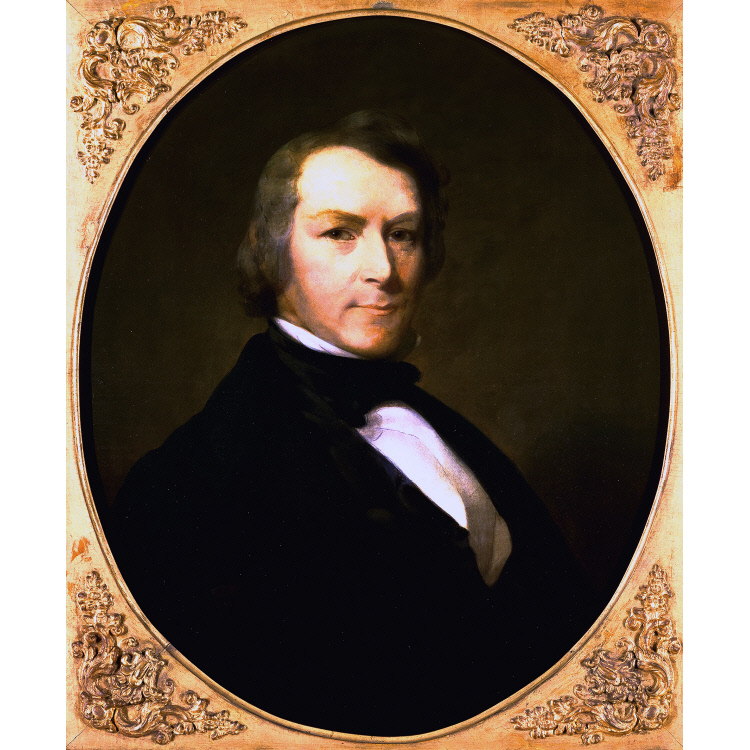
- Portrait by Edward Ludlow Mooney, c. 1852
- Born: October 18, 1787; Hoboken, New Jersey
- Died: April 20, 1856 (aged 68); Hoboken, New Jersey
- Occupation: Steamship builder
- Parent(s): Rachel Cox; John Stevens III
- Relatives: John Cox Stevens (brother); Edwin A. Stevens (brother); See Stevens family

Colonel Robert Livingston Stevens (October 18, 1787 – April 20, 1856) was an American inventor and steamship builder who served as president of the Camden and Amboy Railroad in the 1830s and 1840s.

== Early life ==
Stevens was born in Hoboken, New Jersey on October 18, 1787. He was the second son of thirteen children born to Rachel (née Cox) Stevens and Colonel John Stevens III. His siblings included older brother John Cox Stevens, the first commodore of the New York Yacht Club, and younger brother Edwin Augustus Stevens, who founded the Stevens Institute of Technology.

His paternal grandparents were John Stevens Jr., a prominent New Jersey politician who served as a delegate to the Continental Congress, and Elizabeth (née Alexander) Stevens, who was the daughter of James Alexander, the Attorney General of New Jersey, and Mary (née Spratt) Provoost Alexander, a prominent merchant. His aunt Mary Stevens married Robert R. Livingston, the first Chancellor of the State of New York.

== Career ==
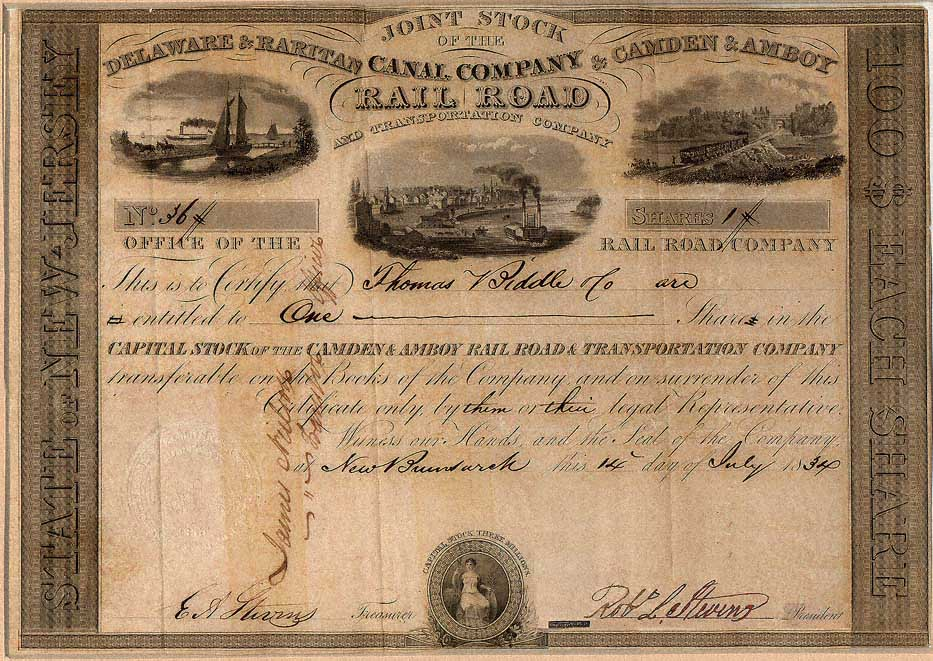
1834 stock certificate of the "Joint Companies" signed by Robert L. Stevens

In 1807, the Stevens and their father built the Phœnix, a steamboat which became the first to navigate the ocean successfully when she traveled from New York City to the Delaware River in 1809. The Phœnix could not operate in the harbor at New York City because Robert Fulton and his partner Robert Livingston, the U.S. Minister to France, had obtained a monopoly there.

Robert Stevens applied the wave line, concave waterlines on a steamboat hull, in 1808, as well as other improvements to shipbuilding. He and his brother, James, involved with the passenger steamship business on the Hudson River in 1834, and both were members of the Hudson River Steamboat Association, a cartel which sought a monopoly on passenger traffic between New York City and Albany.

Stevens was president of the Camden and Amboy Railroad (C&A) in the 1830s and 1840s. When the John Bull steam locomotive arrived on the C&A property, it was originally named Stevens in his honor. Although his father is occasionally credited with the invention of the flanged T rail for railways, Robert Stevens at 42 is considered to have been the inventor of the first all-iron rail construction of the Camden & Amboy. Before 1831, the rails of all previous American railroads were strap iron rails made of wood with a metal strap applied to the wood. One of the two men had traveled to England to purchase the new rails since there was no rolling mill in the United States that was capable of producing the rails. The flat bottomed rail profile is used by railways of every nation. It replaced the cast-iron edge rails that had been introduced in England in 1789, which were made without flanges; instead, flanges were placed on the wheels. (The flanged T rail was introduced in England in 1836 by engineer Charles B. Vignoles (1793-1875), therefore the term "Vignoles rails" came into use in Europe).

He invented a percussion shell, the rights to which he sold to the government. In 1842, he was commissioned by the government to build the first ironclad warship ever constructed, but he died without ever completing it.

Stevens, who never married, died in Hoboken on April 20, 1856.

== For further reading ==
- Today in Science History: October 18. Retrieved October 18, 2005.
- Iles, George (1912), Leading American Inventors, New York: Henry Holt and Company, pp. 28–34
