= John Cox Stevens =

American yacht racer (1785–1857)

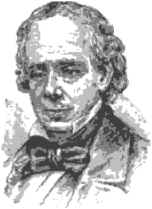
- Born: September 24, 1785; Hoboken, New Jersey, U.S.
- Died: June 10, 1857 (aged 71); New York City, New York, U.S.
- Education: Columbia University
- Spouse: Maria Cambridge Livingston (m. 1809)
- Parent(s): Rachel Cox; John Stevens III
- Relatives: Robert L. Stevens (brother); Edwin A. Stevens (brother); See Stevens family

John Cox Stevens (September 24, 1785 – June 10, 1857) was the founding Commodore of the New York Yacht Club. He was a member of the America syndicate which, in 1851, won the trophy that would become the America's Cup.

== Early life ==
Stevens was born at his family's estate at Castle Point in Hoboken, New Jersey on September 24, 1785. He was the eldest son of Col. John Stevens, a revolutionary war veteran, pioneer in steamboats, and purchaser of what is now Hoboken, and Rachel Cox, who was from New Brunswick, New Jersey. His brothers included Robert Livingston Stevens, a businessman and inventor, and Edwin Augustus Stevens, who founded the Stevens Institute of Technology.

His paternal grandparents were John Stevens Jr., a prominent New Jersey politician who served as a delegate to the Continental Congress, and Elizabeth (née Alexander) Stevens, who was the daughter of James Alexander, the Attorney General of New Jersey, and Mary (née Spratt) Provoost Alexander, a prominent merchant. His aunt Mary Stevens married Robert R. Livingston, the first Chancellor of the State of New York.

== Career ==
Stevens graduated from Columbia University in 1803. He ran the company that had the first steam ferry between Hoboken, New Jersey and New York City.

=== Yachting ===
John Cox Stevens, the sporting son in the family, built a series of yachts. In 1844, on board his yacht, Gimcrack, he was named Commodore of the New York Yacht Club which he and nine others had just proposed forming.

Stevens once served as president of The Jockey Club and set up the 1823 Great North-South Match. The race stoked sectional tensions when the Northern horse, "American Eclipse", defeated the southern colt, "Sir Henry". The northern victory encouraged a northern enthusiasm for horse racing but embarrassed southerners with their pretensions of superiority in breeding, training, and racing horses. He was also a founding member of New York's oldest gentlemen's society, the Union Club of which he served as the second president. He introduced cricket to the United States.

== Personal life ==
On December 27, 1809, he was married to Maria Cambridge Livingston (1799–1865), a member of the socially prominent Livingston family. Maria was the daughter of Robert "Cambridge" Livingston and Elsie Swift Livingston and the granddaughter of Robert Livingston, the 3rd Lord of Livingston Manor. John and Maria did not have any children.

During his early years, he lived at Annandale. After his marriage, they lived in a house called Red Hook, north of Poughkeepsie, New York on the Livingston Manor. During Stevens' time as a horse racer, they lived in a "farmhouse on Long Island, a few miles outside Brooklyn and only three miles from the Union Course." In 1845, the Stevens moved to New York City, where he built a Grecian mansion, known as "Stevens' Palace", located at the corner of College Place and Murray Street and designed by prominent architect Alexander Jackson Davis.

Stevens died in New York City on June 10, 1857. He was buried in the family crypt located under Christ Church in South Amboy, New Jersey.

=== Legacy ===
Stevens was inducted into the America's Cup Hall of Fame in 1994 and the National Sailing Hall of Fame in 2012.
