= H. Otto Wittpenn =

American politician (1871–1931)

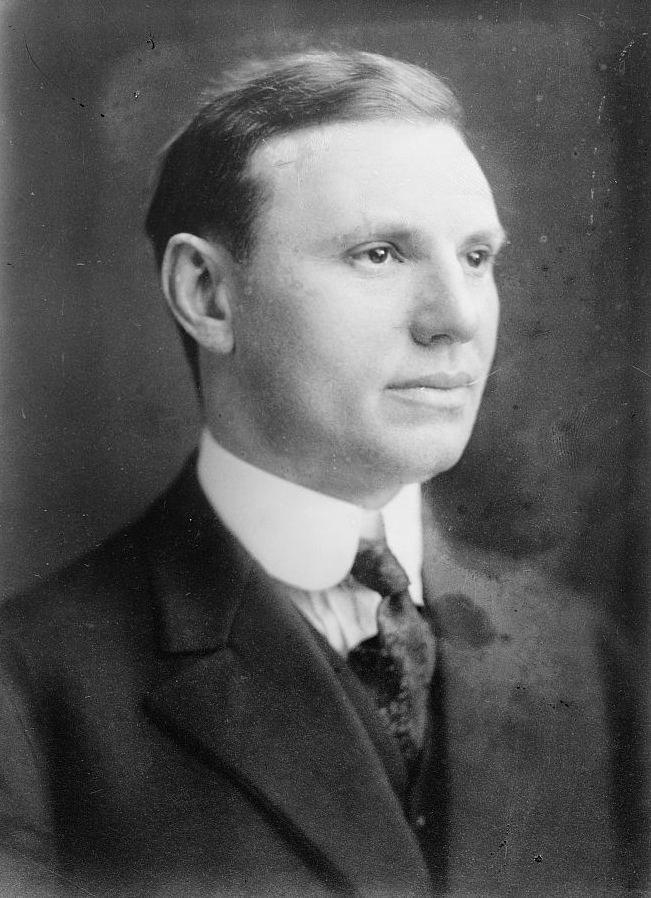

28th Mayor of Jersey City
- In office January 1, 1908 – June 16, 1913
- Preceded by: Mark Fagan
- Succeeded by: Mark Fagan

Personal details
- Born: Henry Otto Wittpenn; October 23, 1871 Jersey City, New Jersey, U.S.
- Died: July 25, 1931 (aged 59) Hoboken, New Jersey, U.S.
- Party: Democratic
- Spouse: Caroline Bayard Stevens Alexander (m. 1915)

Henry Otto Wittpenn (October 23, 1871 – July 25, 1931) was an American politician who served as the Mayor of Jersey City, New Jersey, from January 1, 1908, to June 16, 1913. He was a member of the New Jersey State Highway Commission and was the president of both the Hoboken Land and Improvement Company and the First National Bank of Hoboken. He was also a director of the First National Bank of Jersey City.

== Early life ==
Henry Otto Wittpenn was born on October 23, 1871, to Dora and Henry Wittpenn in Jersey City, New Jersey. His father was a fireman, and later owned and operated a grocery store at 320 Communipaw Avenue. He had a brother and two sisters. One of his sisters married Edwin M. Houghtaling and lived in Montclair, New Jersey, and his other sister married George Dinkel. Wittpenn worked for his father, and later for his uncle, at family-owned stores.

== Career ==
Wittpenn became interested in politics when he gave a speech for James J. Murphy at a convention in Jersey City. Murphy lost the election, but Wittpenn's speech was remembered. He formally entered politics in 1904 as one of the Hudson County, New Jersey, supervisors.

His run for mayor of Jersey City, New Jersey, was in 1907 against the Republican incumbent Mark Fagan. Whitpenn remained in office until 1912 when he lost to Frank Hague. While in office he appointed Cornelia Foster Bradford to the Board of Education. While mayor he saw the completion of the Jersey City Medical Center begun under Mayor Mark Matthew Fagan.

=== Later career ===
In 1916, Wittpenn, the comptroller of customs at the New York Customs House, was nominated by the Democratic Party for governor. Frank Hague is believed by many to have connived with Walter E. Edge, the Republican candidate, to help Edge win by a relatively slim 7,430 votes by not encouraging Democrats to vote for Wittpenn.

President Woodrow Wilson named Wittpenn as the civilian overseer, of the Port of New York. Wittpenn ran for Governor again in 1916, but was not elected. Henry registered for the draft as "Henry Whitpenn" but did not serve. In March 1929 Wittpenn was appointed as a State Highway Commissioner by Governor Lawson.

== Personal life ==
He married Caroline Bayard Stevens (1859–1932), the eldest daughter of Edwin Augustus Stevens on January 6, 1915. She was 11 years older than Wittpenn and the mother of Archibald Stevens Alexander, who had died in 1912. Caroline had previously been married to Archibald Alexander, but her husband had been missing since the divorce. She divorced and waited 20 years to remarry, reportedly to ensure that her first husband was no longer living when she remarried.

Wittpenn died at 9:30 p.m. on July 25, 1931, aged 59, from blood poisoning, following a two-day coma. He was buried in Hoboken Cemetery.

=== Legacy ===
The Wittpenn Bridge opened in 1930, and crosses the Hackensack River between Jersey City, New Jersey, and Kearny, New Jersey. It is part of New Jersey Route 7 and is a four-lane lift span. In 2021, a new Wittpenn Bridge was opened replacing the 1930 bridge.

Political offices
Preceded by Mark M. Fagan	Mayor of Jersey City; 1908–1913	Succeeded by Mark M. Fagan
Party political offices
Preceded by James Fairman Fielder	Democratic Nominee for Governor of New Jersey; 1916	Succeeded by Edward I. Edwards
