= Edwin Augustus Stevens =

American engineer and philanthropist (1795–1868)

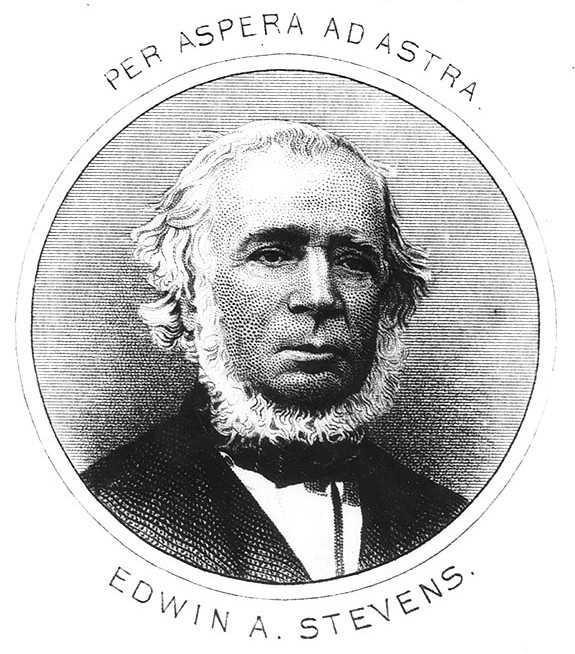
- Line engraving of Edwin A. Stevens published in The Stevens Ironclad Battery
- Born: July 28, 1795; Hoboken, New Jersey, U.S.
- Died: August 7, 1868 (aged 73); Paris, France
- Spouses: Mary Barton Picton (m. 1836; died 1842) Martha Bayard Dod (m. 1854)
- Children: 8, including Edwin Jr. and Caroline Bayard
- Parent(s): John Stevens III; Rachel Cox Stevens
- Relatives: John Cox Stevens (brother); Robert L. Stevens (brother); See Stevens family

Edwin Augustus Stevens (July 28, 1795 – August 7, 1868) was an American engineer, inventor, and entrepreneur who left a bequest that was used to establish the Stevens Institute of Technology.

== Life ==
Stevens was born at Castle Point, Hoboken, New Jersey, the son of Colonel John Stevens III (1749–1838) and his wife Rachel (née Cox) Stevens (1761–1839). He was the sixth of eleven children, and among his older brothers were John Cox Stevens and Robert Livingston Stevens.

== Career ==
At an early age Stevens was entrusted by his father with the family business affairs, and in 1821 at the age of 26 he assumed full responsibility for the Stevens estate in Hoboken and other properties. Also in 1821, he developed the "Jeef Beef," a cast-iron plow with a curved moldboard and replaceable heel piece. The plow was popular among New Jersey farmers. He went on to design many other technological innovations, such as the “twohorse dump wagon” for New York City; the "closed fireroom” system of forced draft for his family's steamboat fleet; and the "vestibule car" for the Camden and Amboy Railroad.

Following the death of Colonel Stevens in 1838, Edwin and his brother Robert worked on a commission from the United States government to construct the nation's first ironclad naval vessel. After conducting tests to determine the amount of armor a vessel needed to defend itself against naval guns, the two brothers constructed a huge vessel known as the Stevens Battery. Though the craft was never fully completed, it nevertheless laid the groundwork for the modern armored warship. A scaled-down version, the USRC Naugatuck, saw limited action in the Civil War. After the war, the Naugatuck and the Battery were sold for scrap.

Stevens was part of the syndicate from the New York Yacht Club that built and raced the schooner-yacht America. His brother, John Cox Stevens, was the head of the syndicate and the NYYC's first Commodore. Edwin Augustus also served as Commodore of the NYYC, resigning in 1866.

== Personal life ==
In 1836, he married Mary Barton Picton (1806–1842), daughter of Rev. Thomas Picton of Princeton, New Jersey. Together, they had a daughter:

- Mary Picton Stevens (1840–1903), who married Virginia politician Muscoe Russell Hunter Garnett (1821–1864). After his death, she married Edward Parke Custis Lewis (1837–1892), U.S. Minister to Portugal.

In 1854, after his first wife's death, Stevens married Martha Bayard Dod (1831–1899), the daughter of Albert Baldwin Dod, a professor of mathematics at Princeton University, and Caroline Smith (née Bayard) Dod, who was the daughter of Samuel Bayard and granddaughter of Continental Congressman John Bubenheim Bayard. With Martha he had seven children:

- John Stevens IV (1856-1895), father of Mary Picton Stevens Hammond, who perished in the sinking of the RMS Lusitania. and grandfather of Millicent Fenwick
- Edwin Augustus Stevens, Jr. (1858–1918), who married Emily Contee Lewis (1857–1931), the great-granddaughter of Lawrence Lewis, George Washington's nephew, and Eleanor Parke Custis Lewis, Washington's adopted daughter and step-granddaughter.
- Caroline Bayard Stevens (1859-1932), who married Archibald Alexander and then H. Otto Wittpenn
- Julia Augusta Stevens (1863-1870)
- Robert Livingston Stevens II (1864-1907), who married Mary Stuart Whitney, great-grand daughter of Stephen Whitney. They were the parents of Robert Livingston Stevens (1907-1972) who was the second husband of Grace Vanderbilt, daughter of Cornelius III and Grace Graham Vanderbilt.
- Charles Albert Stevens (1865-1901)
- Richard Stevens (1868–1919), a Columbia College and Columbia Law School graduate who served as president of the Hoboken Land and Improvement Company.

Stevens died in Paris, France on August 7, 1868.

=== Legacy ===
In Stevens's will, he left the bulk of his fortune to his wife and children, but also donated land adjoining the Stevens family estate, as well as $150,000 for the erection of a building and $500,000 as an endowment for the establishment of an "institution of learning". Because of the Stevens family's close ties with engineering, the will's executors decided it would be an institution devoted to the "mechanical arts". This institution became Stevens Institute of Technology, which opened its doors in 1870.

The university has since expanded to an entire hilltop campus overlooking Manhattan, and the original building funded by Stevens's bequest, which was renamed Edwin A. Stevens Hall, continues to house much of the School of Engineering, the oldest of the university's four schools.
