= Albert Baldwin Dod =

American Presbyterian Theologian and professor

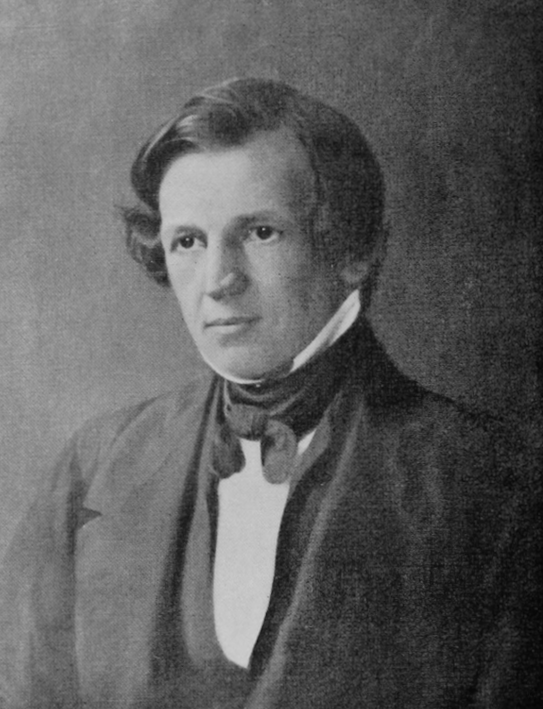
- Born: March 24, 1805; Mendham, New Jersey, U.S.
- Died: November 20, 1845 (aged 40); Princeton, New Jersey, U.S.
- Education: Princeton University; University of North Carolina; New York University
- Occupations: Presbyterian theologian, professor
- Spouse: Caroline Smith Bayard (m. 1830)
- Children: 8, including Martha
- Parent(s): Daniel Dod; Nancy Squire

Albert Baldwin Dod (March 24, 1805 – November 20, 1845) was an American Presbyterian theologian and professor of mathematics.

== Early life ==
Dod was born on March 24, 1805, in Mendham, New Jersey. He was the son of Daniel Dod (1778–1823) and Nancy (née Squire) Dod (1780–1851). His mother was the sister of Dr. Ezra Squire, of Caldwell, New Jersey.

== Career ==
After a religious awakening while at college in Princeton, where he graduated with the class of 1822, Dod became affiliated with the influential Princeton Theologians. He published frequently in the group's chief outlet, the Biblical Repertory and Princeton Review, edited by Charles Hodge. Among his publications there, an attack on Transcendentalism (perhaps written with James Waddel Alexander; published in the January 1839 issue) attracted wide notice and was later republished by Andrews Norton.

For much of his life he taught mathematics at the college, and participated in theological discussion and preaching at the Seminary, in Princeton. The Doctorate in Divinity, though, was conferred on him by the University of North Carolina and by New York University.

== Personal life ==
Dod married Caroline Smith Bayard (1807–1891), the daughter of Samuel Bayard (1766–1840) and granddaughter of Continental Congressman John Bubenheim Bayard (1738–1808), all descendants of Peter Stuyvesant. Together, Albert and Caroline had eight children:

- Martha Bayard Dod (1831–1899), who married Edwin Augustus Stevens (1795–1868), founder of Stevens Institute of Technology.
- Caroline Bayard Dod (1832–1859), who married Richard Stockton (1824–1876), son of Robert F. Stockton and grandson of Richard Stockton, both U.S. senators.
- Albert Baldwin Dod (1835–1880), a Captain during the U.S. Civil War who married Elizabeth A. Mcintosh on June 16, 1858.
- Julia Washington Dod (1836–1837), who died young.
- Samuel Bayard Dod (1837–1907), who married Isabella Williamson Green (1840–1883), the granddaughter of Ashbel Green, 8th President of Princeton University.
- Susan Bratford Dod (1840–1912), who married her brother-in-law Richard Stockton after her sister's death in 1859.
- Charles Hodge Dod (1841–1864), a Captain on the staff of Maj. General Winfield Scott Hancock during the civil war who died in service.
- Mary Dod (b. 1843).

The 1840 US census records Dod as owning one female slave aged ten to twenty-four. This is the latest known instance of a Princeton professor owning slaves; Dod was also one of the last slaveholders in the community of Princeton as well as New Jersey overall. The state adopted a system of gradual emancipation in 1804, meaning that the woman in Dod's household was born to an enslaved mother between 1816 and 1830, and that she would be manumitted when she came of age.

Dod died of pleurisy after a brief illness on November 20, 1845.

=== Legacy ===
In 1869, his son Samuel Bayard Dod (Princeton Class of 1857) established an Endowed Professorship at Princeton University in mathematics in memory of him. In 1926, his great-grandson, Richard Stockton III, commissioned a bust of Dod which was placed at Dod Hall, the undergraduate dormitory named in his honor.
