= Church of the Holy Innocents (Hoboken, New Jersey) =

Historic church in New Jersey, United States

- U.S. National Register of Historic Places
- New Jersey Register of Historic Places
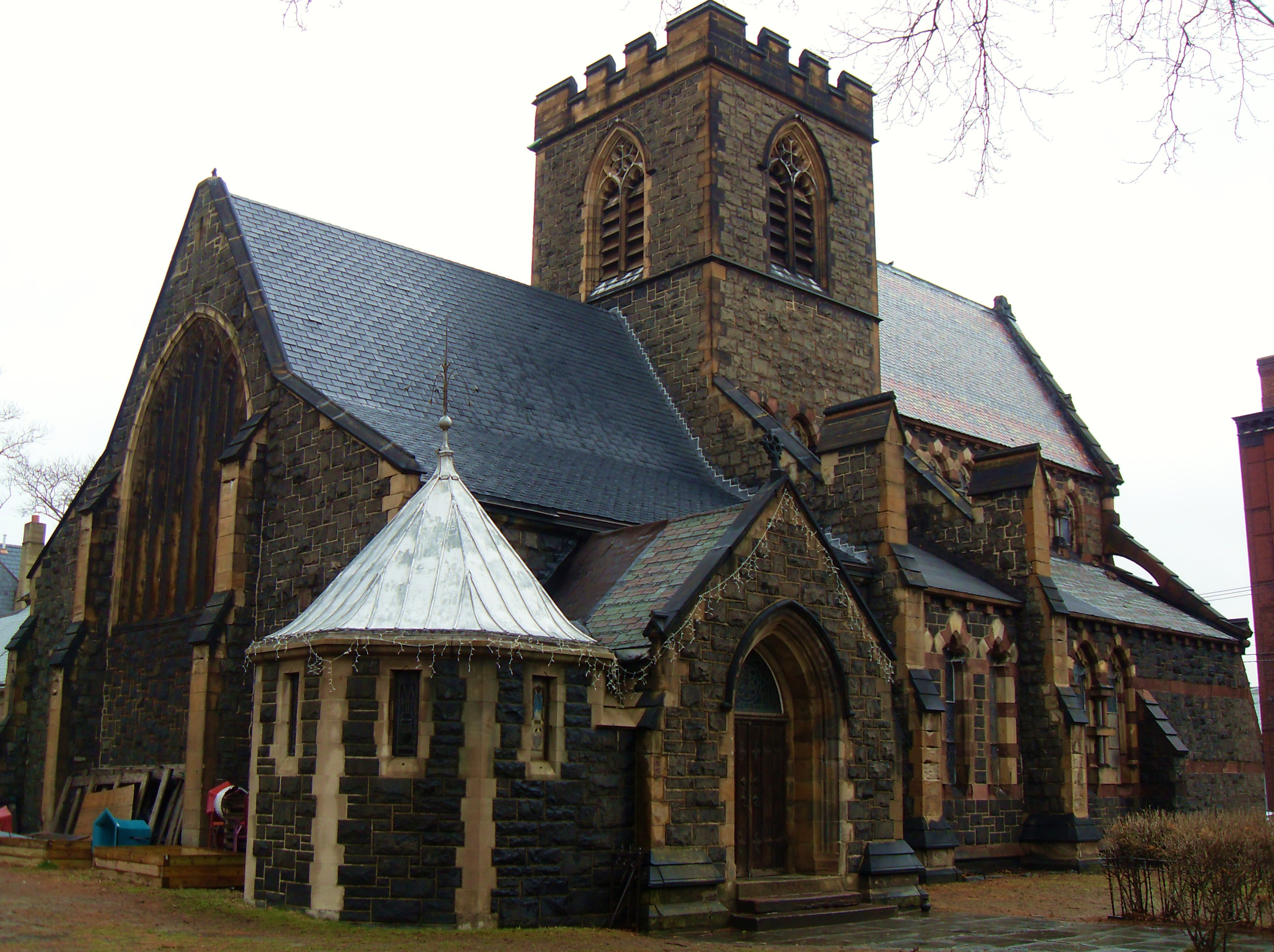

- Location within Hudson County, New Jersey Location within New Jersey Location within the United States
- Location: Willow Avenue and 6th Street, Hoboken, New Jersey
- Coordinates: 40°44′38″N 74°2′1″W
- Area: 0.8 acres (0.32 ha)
- Built: 1885
- Architect: Edward Tuckerman Potter; Henry Vaughan
- Architectural style: Gothic, Shingle Style
- NRHP reference No.: 77000871
- NJRHP No.: 1460

Significant dates
- Added to NRHP: May 24, 1977
- Designated NJRHP: February 4, 1977

The Church of the Holy Innocents was an Episcopal church at Willow Avenue and 6th Street in Hoboken, Hudson County, New Jersey, United States. The congregation was founded in 1872. It was built 1885 to the designs of Edward Tuckerman Potter and Henry Vaughan. The choir was added in 1913, the baptistery in 1932. It was added to the National Register of Historic Places in 1977. It is no longer in use as a church but the building remains.

== See also ==
- National Register of Historic Places listings in Hudson County, New Jersey
