= Hoboken Land and Improvement Company Building =

Building in Hoboken, New Jersey, US

- U.S. National Register of Historic Places
- New Jersey Register of Historic Places

- Location within Hudson County, New Jersey Location within New Jersey Location within the United States
- Location: 1 Newark Street, Hoboken, New Jersey
- Coordinates: 40°44′10″N 74°1′44″W
- Area: 0.4 acres (0.16 ha)
- Built: 1889
- Architect: Charles Fall
- NRHP reference No.: 79001491
- NJRHP No.: 1470

Significant dates
- Added to NRHP: July 3, 1979
- Designated NJRHP: March 29, 1979

The Hoboken Land and Improvement Company Building, is located in Hoboken, Hudson County, New Jersey, United States. The building was designed by Charles Fall and was built by Myles Tierney in 1889. The building was added to the National Register of Historic Places on July 3, 1979. The building housed the offices of the Stevens family real estate holding corporation the Hoboken Land and Improvement Company. The building is notable for its high quality brickwork, with recessed panels and contrasting color mortars.

== See also ==
- National Register of Historic Places listings in Hudson County, New Jersey
- John Den, ex dem. James B. Murray et al. v. The Hoboken Land and Improvement Company
