= Kenneth C. Rogers =

American academic administrator (born 1929)

- Kenneth C. Rogers

Commissioner of the Nuclear Regulatory Commission
- In office August 7, 1987 – June 30, 1997
- President: Ronald Reagan; George H.W Bush; Bill Clinton

5th President of Stevens Institute of Technology
- In office 1972–1987
- Preceded by: Jess H. Davis
- Succeeded by: Harold J. Raveché

Personal details
- Born: March 21, 1929 (age 97) Teaneck, New Jersey, U.S.
- Party: Republican
- Education: Columbia

Kenneth Cannicott Rogers (born March 21, 1929) was the 5th president of Stevens Institute of Technology in Hoboken, New Jersey.

== Stevens Institute of Technology ==
Prior to becoming president of Stevens, Rogers was head of the physics department and obtained sizable grants under the last years of the Davis administration; a factor that largely led to him being chosen. Within his first two years in office the number of nontenured faculty was cut by ten-percent. Shortly thereafter the University followed a national trend in huge drops in graduate enrollment between 1968 and 1974, following the end of the Vietnam War. At the same time, the independent corporate "Stevens Alumni Association" attempted to raise funds in parallel with an initiative by the Board of Trustees and President." Both initiatives suffered as a result of the other and in 1973 the Association amended its bylaws to put "contributions to the [Association run] Stevens Fund under the direction of the Institute" and that said funds would "flow directly into the treasury of Stevens. Later that decade faculty of Stevens would become disgruntled and strike but be assuaged to come back under the pretense of the creation of a Faculty Council.

In line with the institute's founding principles set forth by early presidents Morton and Humphreys Paul Miller came to Stevens as "Artist in Residence" to further the well-rounded education of Stevens engineers. His most visible impact on campus, "The Concrete Bird" was erected in front of Palmer Hall and was later moved to the library.

During the search for a president following Rogers' resignation, Richard Griskey guided the university. His most notable contribution was the establishment of a Cooperative Education Program that would combine engineering education with on-the-job training in a five-year program."

=== Specialized accreditation ===
Stevens Institute of Technology is known for its consistent history in a broad based engineering curriculum. Rogers' initial plan for specialized accreditation of specific subjects he was met with resistance from the board of trustees since it implied going astray from the broad-based core. Rogers urged that individual accreditation was critical to maintaining the university's undergraduate engineering enrollment; he believed the attraction of a General Engineering Program was dying. After deliberation the trustees accepted the plan with the stipulation that every student would still be provided with "an education including major elements of the classical fields of engineering, the basic sciences, the humanities and management, through a unified required core of courses that extends from the freshman year through the senior year and constitutes approximately three-quarter of the entire course requirements of the baccalaureate degree.". Faculty arguments in favor of the accreditation included discrimination by recruiters, specific honor societies, professional societies, licensing boards, publication lists and prospective faculty.

== Nuclear Regulatory Committee ==
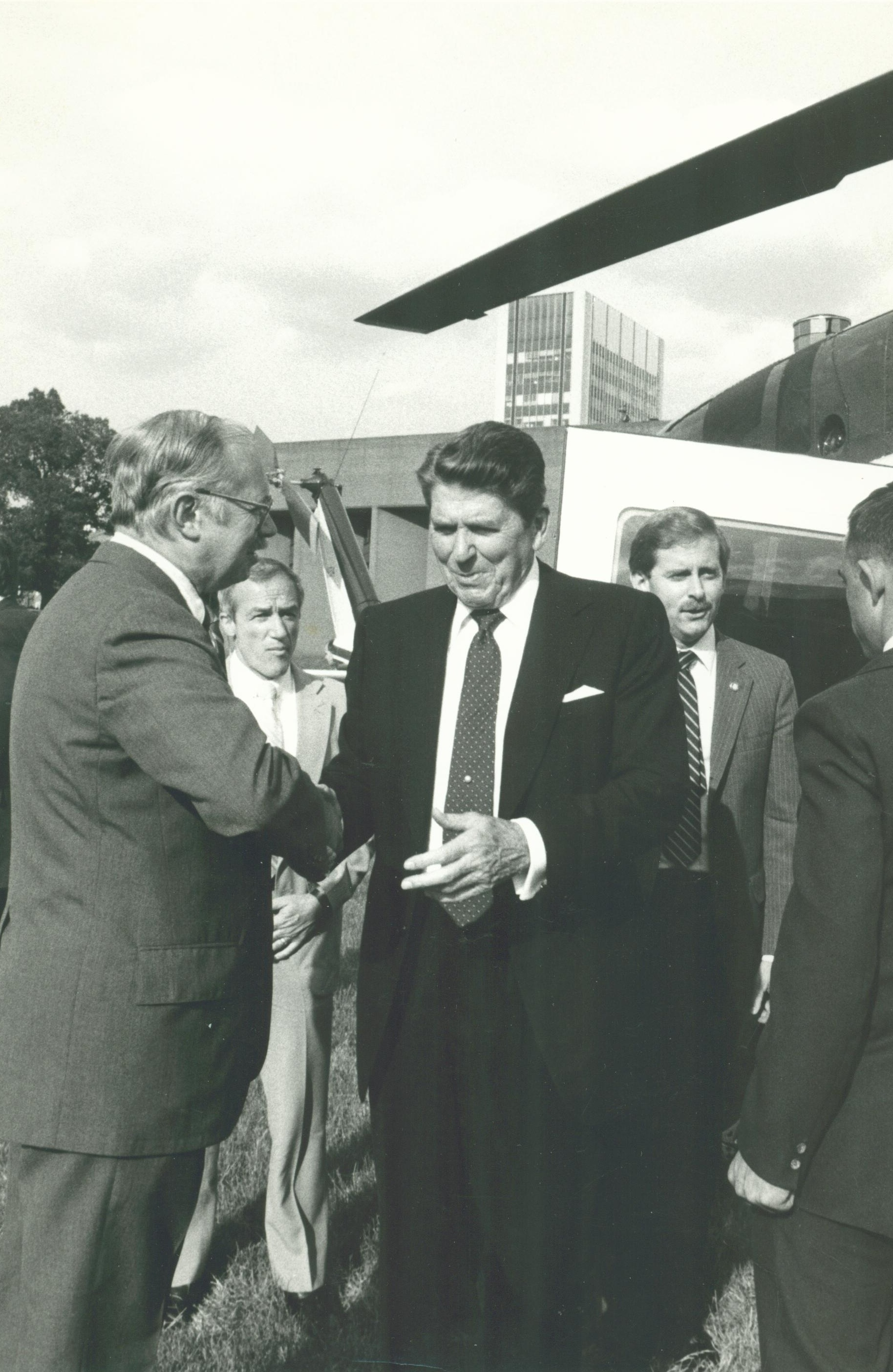
Ronald Reagan visiting Rogers on Stevens' campus shortly before his appointment to the NRC.

In August 1987 the United States Senate confirmed Rogers' appointment by Ronald Reagan as a member of the Nuclear Regulatory Commission. The hearing for his appointment feel under the Environment and Public Works Committee in the preceding July and membership included Bill Bradley and Frank Lautenberg. Rogers ended his presence at the Institute after thirty years and immediately moved to Washington and remains there to present day.
