= Lawrence Babbio Jr. =

American businessman

Lawrence T. Babbio Jr., generally called Larry, is a former vice chairman and president of Verizon, with responsibility for the Verizon Telecom and Verizon Business units. He was also a member of the board of directors of Verizon Wireless. Since 2007, Babbio has been a senior adviser to Warburg Pincus, a private equity firm. He is the CEO of Afiniti.

Babbio began his communications career in 1966 with New Jersey Bell Telephone. He worked in a variety of positions in engineering, network construction, and technology development with New Jersey Bell and AT&T. In January 1995 he was elected vice chairman of Bell Atlantic Corporation.

Prior to the Bell Atlantic/GTE merger, Babbio was president and chief operating officer for Bell Atlantic. He shared oversight of, and responsibility for, all of the corporation's business operations, restructuring of the business units, the GTE merger process, and developing new growth opportunities.

Babbio also was chairman of the company's Global Wireless Group, one of the largest wireless operations worldwide. He was the lead executive in charge of developing Bell Atlantic's domestic and international wireless communications strategy. Under his leadership, Bell Atlantic substantially increased the size and scope of its domestic and international wireless holdings.

In May 2002 Babbio was elected to the board of directors of Hewlett-Packard Company. He previously was on the board of Compaq Computer Corporation since 1995. He has been on the board of ARAMARK Corporation since 1999. Babbio also is chairman of the board of trustees of Stevens Institute of Technology.

Babbio graduated in 1962 from St. Peter's Preparatory School in Jersey City, New Jersey, and has been inducted into the school's alumni hall of fame. He holds a B.E. in electrical engineering from Stevens Institute of Technology, and an M.B.A. from New York University.

== Attorney General Matter ==
On September 17, 2009, New Jersey Attorney General Anne Milgram announced charges against Babbio and Stevens Institute of Technology president Harold J. Raveché. According to the state's 16-count lawsuit, Stevens' leaders kept several trustees in the dark about the school's financial condition. Raveché and his administration allegedly spent the school's money at greater rates than the board approved, scavenging restricted assets, excessive loans and gifts to the school earmarked for other purposes. Milgram also sought reforms to the school's governance and accounting.

The lawsuit alleged that Raveché and Babbio misrepresented the finances of the school and caused the endowment to fall by $42 million from $157 million in 2000 to $115 million in 2009. The lawsuit detailed that Raveché received below-market loans from the school, at least some of which were forgiven by Stevens. The complaint also raises questions about Raveché's salary which had been greater than that of the president of Massachusetts Institute of Technology, a much larger, better known school.

The school disputed the allegations, brought a preemptive lawsuit against the State of New Jersey, and contended that the state attorney general had overstepped her legal authority. Stevens also sought unsuccessfully to keep the attorney general's lawsuit confidential.

The litigation was settled on January 15, 2010, on Milgram's last day in office. The settlement required Dr. Raveché to repay low-interest loans from the school, and for Stevens to correct by-laws to forestall future allegations of perceived misconduct. Raveché voluntarily stepped down as president of the institute at the end of the 2010 academic year, after 22 years in office. He was succeeded as president in 2011 by Dr. Nariman Farvardin. Babbio's term as board chairman expired in May 2013, and he was succeeded as chair by a fellow Stevens alum and Verizon executive, Ms. Virginia P. Ruesterholz. Babbio was subsequently named chairman emeritus of the Stevens Board by President Farvardin.

On June 6, 2016, the consent judgment which had been in place since January 2010 between Stevens Institute of Technology and the New Jersey attorney general was lifted by court order and with the consent of the attorney general's office. The consent judgment arose from circumstances at Stevens pre-2010, and addressed a number of matters relating primarily to governance.

As stated in the consent judgment, “Stevens has fully complied with the obligations to which it agreed in the Consent Judgment and has demonstrated to the State a continued focus on maintaining best practices in the area of governance for institutions of higher education. Lifting the Consent Judgment will afford Stevens added flexibility to make further enhancements to the ways it oversees its affairs and to respond and adapt to the evolving landscape of best governance practices....”
