= Jess H. Davis =

American academic administrator (1906–1972)

Jess Harrison Davis

4th President of Stevens Institute of Technology
- In office 1951–1971
- Preceded by: Harvey N. Davis
- Succeeded by: Kenneth C. Rogers

Personal details
- Born: July 29, 1906 Columbus, Ohio
- Died: September 17, 1972 (aged 66) Charlottesville, Virginia
- Education: Ohio State University

Jess Harrison Davis (July 29, 1906 – September 17, 1972) was the 4th President of Stevens Institute of Technology in Hoboken, New Jersey.

== Education and early career ==
Davis was born in Gallipolis, Ohio, on July 29, 1906, to Willard Ellsworth and Winifred Jones-Davis. He married college classmate Dorothy Carrigan in 1929 and together they had one daughter, Sarah Louise. Davis obtained his bachelor's in mechanical engineering from Ohio State University in 1929 and his master's in 1933. He went on to St. Lawrence University where he received his Doctor of Science, adding a Doctor of Engineering from Clarkson College of Technology in 1951.

He began his career as student engineer and assistant to maintenance superintendent at Ohio Bell Telephone Company. He left after just two years to fill a position of mechanical engineer at the Atmospheric Nitrogen Corporation in Hopewell, Virginia. Davis entered academia in 1929 as instructor of mechanical engineering at Clarkson College in Potsdam, New York, and Department of Mechanical Engineering head at the University of Louisville's Speed Scientific School. He moved up to dean of administration and eventually acting president and president by 1948.

Davis also refined his technical and leadership skills as director of Devenco, Inc., Nabisco, Prudential Life Insurance Co, Bethlehem Steel Co, Carrier Corp, commissioner of the Port Authority of New York and Hackensack Meadowlands Commission, director of Philip Morris Inc., president of the New York State Association of Engineering Colleges in 1950, chairman of the education committee of the Engineers' Council for Professional Development in Region I, and chairman of the celebration for the seventy-fifth anniversary of the American Society of Mechanical Engineers. He was also a licensed Professional Engineer in New York, New Jersey and Kentucky.

== Stevens Institute of Technology ==
Under Davis' presidency the university expanded student enrollment and faculty, added several buildings including the Howe Center and S.C. Williams Library, Humphreys Hall and Davis Hall (named after former Stevens presidents, Alexander Crombie Humphreys and Harvey N. Davis. The additional dormitories expanded the campus's potential from housing 130 students to more than 600. The most sensational addition to Stevens' residence life was utilizing a ship, the SS Stevens, as a floating dormitory. The ship was removed in the 1970s due to the rising heating cost and student initiated prank that put the ship in motion up the Hudson River from which the Institute's radio station, WCPR: Castle Point Radio, was broadcast as far as the Florida Keys. The school lost its license to broadcast with the Federal Communications Commission (FCC) and has not regained it to date; WCPR may only broadcast internally and via the internet.

Jess Davis also sought to increase the quality of faculty, expanding the number of faculty with Ph.D.s from 13 of 35 to 118 of 129. He initiated the development of undergraduate programs in science and doctorates in engineering, science and management.

Social hallmarks of the Davis era were notable in two sectors: a program to expand access to engineering and science for minorities and the inclusion of women in Stevens undergraduate programs. This move was, in part, a result of the urban riots of the 1960s which led to federal funding for programs assisting disadvantaged minorities. In 1967 Davis encouraged the Dean of Student Affairs, Colonel William L. Bingham, to organize the Stevens Technical Enrichment Program (STEP).

=== The Cold War ===
During the Cold War, funding for academe was generated by the belief that education on all levels created a democratic citizenry which would strengthen western institutions. As such, Stevens' expansion of campus and academic programs were largely funded by levels of government, foundations, and private industry and individuals gifts at a rate never before seen. In 1956 the graduate school enrollment had outgrown undergraduate by 1035:976. This was done largely by the work of Luigi Pollara, founder of the Polymer Processing Institute, who commanded much of the Stevens graduate school expansion. He also began the departments of Chemistry and Chemical Engineering during this time. Pollara shared a philosophy with new graduate school dean Ralph A. Morgan, former director of the National Science Foundation, that faculty and doctoral students should be engaged in funded research. This outlook matched well with the increased availability of grants and fellowships offered by the government.

=== Master Plan ===
In order to meet the needs of the increasing undergraduate and graduate student population (set in motion by Harvey N. Davis before him), Jess Davis developed a master plan to meet Stevens' future and present needs. The plan included two undergraduate dormitories, a graduate residence hall, construction of a library, a student-faculty center with new dining facility, and additional research laboratories. The most controversial of these was the demolition of the notorious Stevens Castle, acquired from Edwin A. Stevens Jr. in 1911. The Castle's location was slated to be the location of the new student-faculty center. To mollify the alumni the architect created a remembrance of a feature in the Castle by including a hanging staircase in the lobby of the new building.

To raise the necessary capital for this ambitious plan he created an Office of Development and Public Relations Office. Major gifts were made by alum John McDermott, President and Founder of Texas Instruments, the sale of auto pioneer Edward B. Gallaher's estate, the Charles Hayden Foundation, Anson Wood Burchard (Chairman of General Electric), and James B. Pierce, for whom the dining hall is named.

=== Retirement and death ===
Davis retired as president of Stevens Institute of Technology in June 1971 after serving for twenty years. His cited reasons were his age and belief that the college should be relinquished to a younger man. He died on September 17, 1972, in Charlottesville, Virginia.
