= Kenneth Rogers =

Kenneth Rogers may refer to:

- Kenneth C. Rogers (born 1929), American president of Stevens Institute of Technology
- Kenny Rogers (1938–2020), American singer, songwriter and actor
- Kenny Rogers (baseball) (born 1964), American baseball pitcher
