= Harvey N. Davis =

American engineer, teacher and 3rd President of Stevens Institute of Technology

Harvey Nathaniel Davis
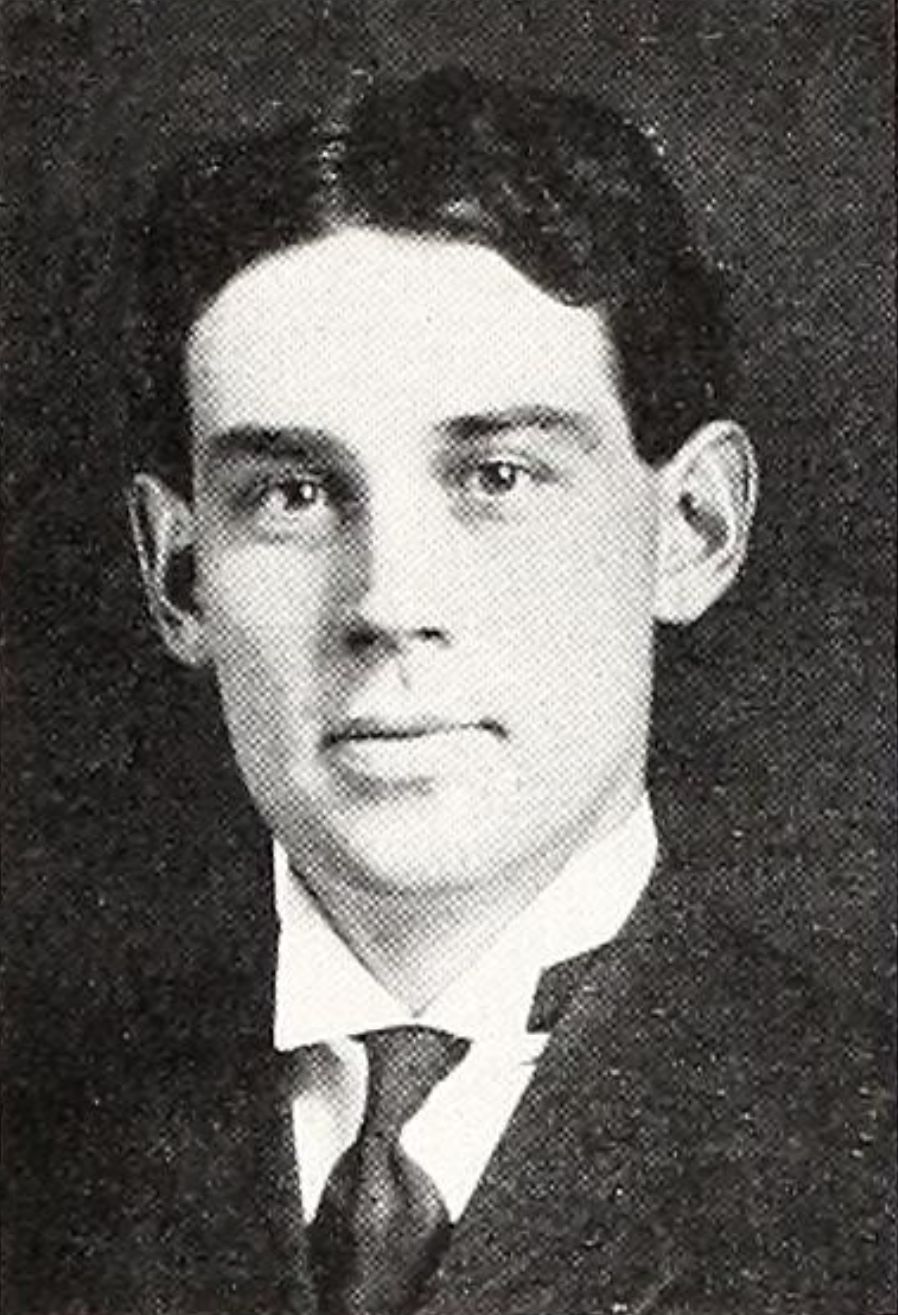

3rd President of Stevens Institute of Technology
- In office 1928–1951
- Preceded by: Alexander Crombie Humphreys
- Succeeded by: Jess Harrison Davis

57th President of the American Society of Mechanical Engineers
- In office 1939–1938
- Preceded by: James Hervey Herron
- Succeeded by: Alexander Graham Christie

Personal details
- Born: June 6, 1881 Providence, Rhode Island
- Died: December 3, 1952 (aged 71) New York, New York
- Spouse: Alice Marion Rhode (m. 1911)
- Children: Nathaniel Davis
- Education: Harvard University, M.A. (1903), Ph.D. (1906)

Harvey Nathaniel Davis (June 6, 1881 – December 3, 1952) was an American engineer, teacher, the 3rd President of Stevens Institute of Technology in Hoboken, New Jersey, and the 57th president of the American Society of Mechanical Engineers in the year 1938-39. Davis was elected to the American Academy of Arts and Sciences in 1911 and the American Philosophical Society in 1935.

== Biography ==
=== Education and early career ===
Davis was born on June 6, 1881, in Providence, Rhode Island, to Nathaniel French Davis and Lydia Martin Bellows. He obtained his M.A. in 1903, and his Ph.D. in physics in 1906, both from Harvard University. He taught mathematics at Brown University and later returned to Harvard as a Professor of Physics and Mechanical Engineering.

In 1928 the family moved to Hoboken as Davis assumed his appointment to the position of President of Stevens Institute of Technology. Davis remained well rounded, participating in activities and policy making outside of the Institute. Shortly after assuming his residency he joined the Hoboken Chamber of Commerce in 1928, becoming its Director in 1929 and Vice President from 1931 to 1933.

=== The American Society of Mechanical Engineers ===
Davis would influence the academic and industrial side of engineering through the American Society of Mechanical Engineers. He was a manager of the ASME from 1929 to 1930, elevating to Vice President in 1931 until 1932 and President from 1938 to 1939.

In 1930 he orchestrated a fiftieth anniversary celebration of the society in Stevens' auditorium: the exact location in which the ASME had been founded. The hallmark of the festivities was a play entitled Control: A Pageant of Engineering Progress, under the direction of Harold Burris-Meyer and G.P. Baker.

=== Family and death ===
Davis married Alice Marion Rhode on June 28, 1911. Their son, Nathaniel Davis was born in 1925 and would go on to become a United States diplomat and professor at Harvey-Mudd College.

Davis died on December 3, 1952, at Roosevelt Hospital in Manhattan.

== Work ==
=== Stevens Institute of Technology ===
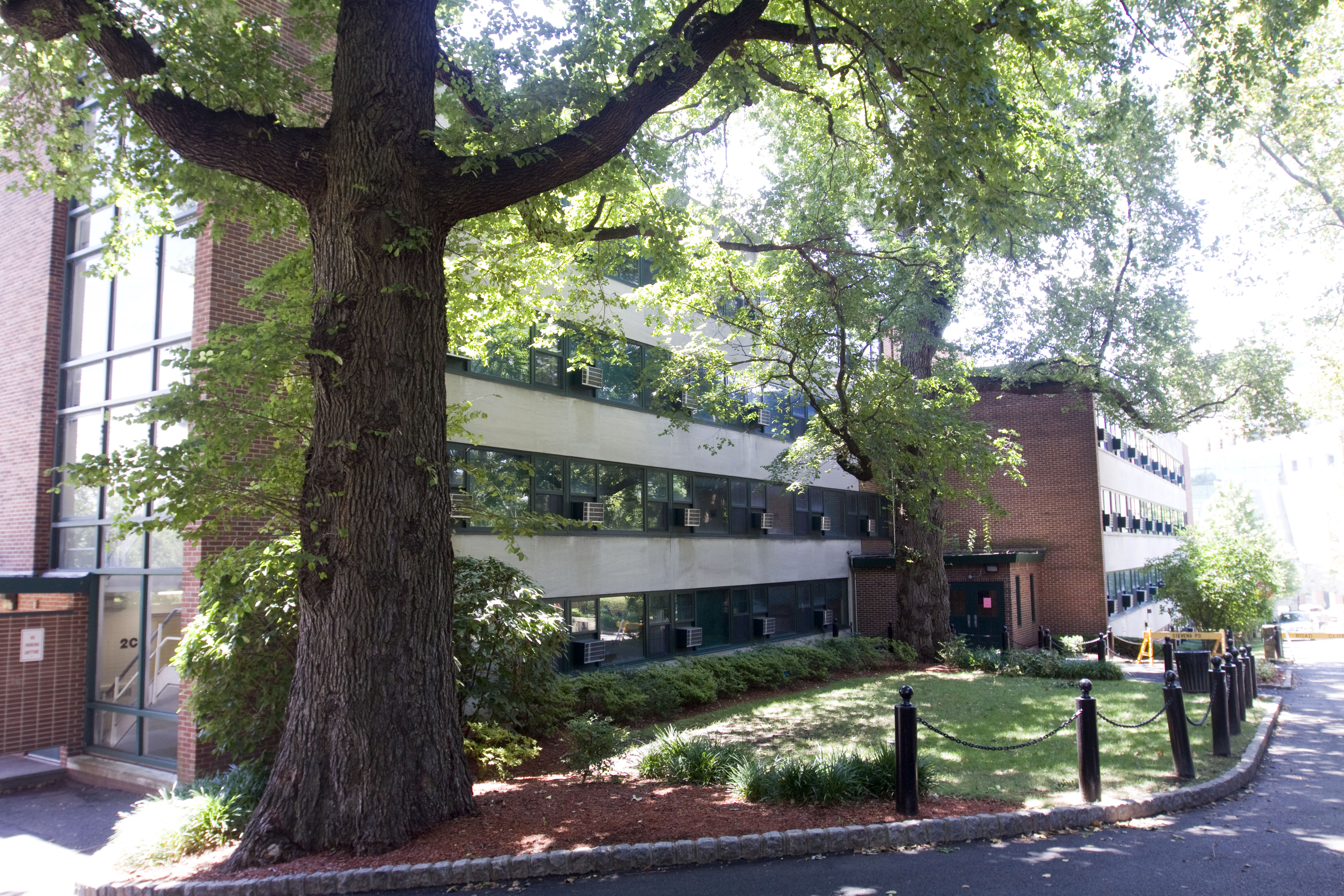
A side view of Harvey N. Davis Hall on the campus of Stevens Institute of Technology

Upon taking office, Davis affirmed his support in general engineering courses and almost immediately expanded the courses in Civil Engineering by introducing a six-week surveying experience that students would complete the summer before their sophomore years at Camp Johnsonburg, a satellite of Stevens' main campus. The Mechanical Engineering program also incorporated more practical projects to instill a knowledge of basic principles. The Economics and Humanities Departments were also expanded and strengthened, including the development of a "Human Engineering Laboratory." This laboratory gave aptitude and vocational guidance tests to Stevens students and implemented a change in exact mathematical grades for courses to letter grades.

Following the expansion in enrollment Davis was responsible for expanding the opportunities for students to dorm on campus. His presidency saw an increase from 30 campus residence to more than 300. A residence hall would be constructed on the east most part of Stevens campus in 1962 in clear view of New York City.

=== Graduate school ===
Harvey Davis oversaw the creation of graduate programs at Stevens. Done in part to retain the excellent reputation of the institute for teaching, but to embellish with it a reputation and competitiveness in the area of research. The implementation of such programs would contribute to part of Stevens' survival during the Great Depression and give it an additional edge as it prevailed during World War II. One notable program of the time began in 1938; the Department of Metallurgy was created at Stevens, with Alfred Bornemann, Walter Kidde's nephew, as its head and first Professor of graduate classes in the subject.

=== The Great Depression ===
Davis ceded power to powerful alumni, rather than the trustees in the face of the Great Depression, but still created new programs and hired new faculty under his own auspices to keep the Institute progressive. Utilizing many of the connections he made as President of the ASME, Davis brought industry giants on board to develop programs and departments; notable contributors included Walter Kidde, Alfred Bornemann, Robert C. Stanley ("The Nickel King"), and William H. Peirce ("The Copper King").

By the end of the Great Depression in 1942, over two-thirds of alumni were participating in financial giving and the Annual Fund reached a record level of $185,000; alumni giving, along with that of trustees, ensured the survival of Stevens even in the face of eleven deficit budgets in a row.

=== World War II & War Production ===
Davis was nationally known at this time for his speeches and radio talks about industrial preparedness, often citing that "Production is more important to defense than combat training." After receiving $140,000 in 1941 from the US Office of Education, Stevens established a Defense Industries Training School to give intensive three-month courses to train technical personnel on the sub-professional level. The grant paid for Stevens faculty to give non-credit and tuition-free courses to 650 adult students working in defense industries. Davis also facilitated the work of A.M. Mayer with the New York Metropolitan Opera to conduct and apply research in psychoacoustics supported by the Rockefeller Foundation.

In May 1942 Stevens switched from an eighteen-week semester schedule to a sixteen-week trimester schedule. Students were required to spend two terms on campus and one term in war industry if not enrolled in the naval officer training program. Following this move, in the summer of 1942 the War Production Board recognized the need of coordination of research on materials required in producing the weapons of war. They created the Office of Production Research and Development drafting Harvey Davis to take up the task as director. This along with Professor Kenneth Davidson's clout as a member of the National Defense Research Committee and National Advisory Committee for Aeronautics, the predecessor to NASA, the two brought tremendous dollars to Stevens. The Davidson towing tank was heavily subsidized by the Navy and was bigger than any Navy or Allied test tank in existence.

Stevens emerged from the wars years with increased reputation as an engineering college. This resulted in an influx of veterans enrolling upon returning from the war; undergraduate enrollment more than doubled, from 600 to 1400.
