= Davidson Laboratory =

Marine hydrodynamics research facility at Stevens Institute of Technology

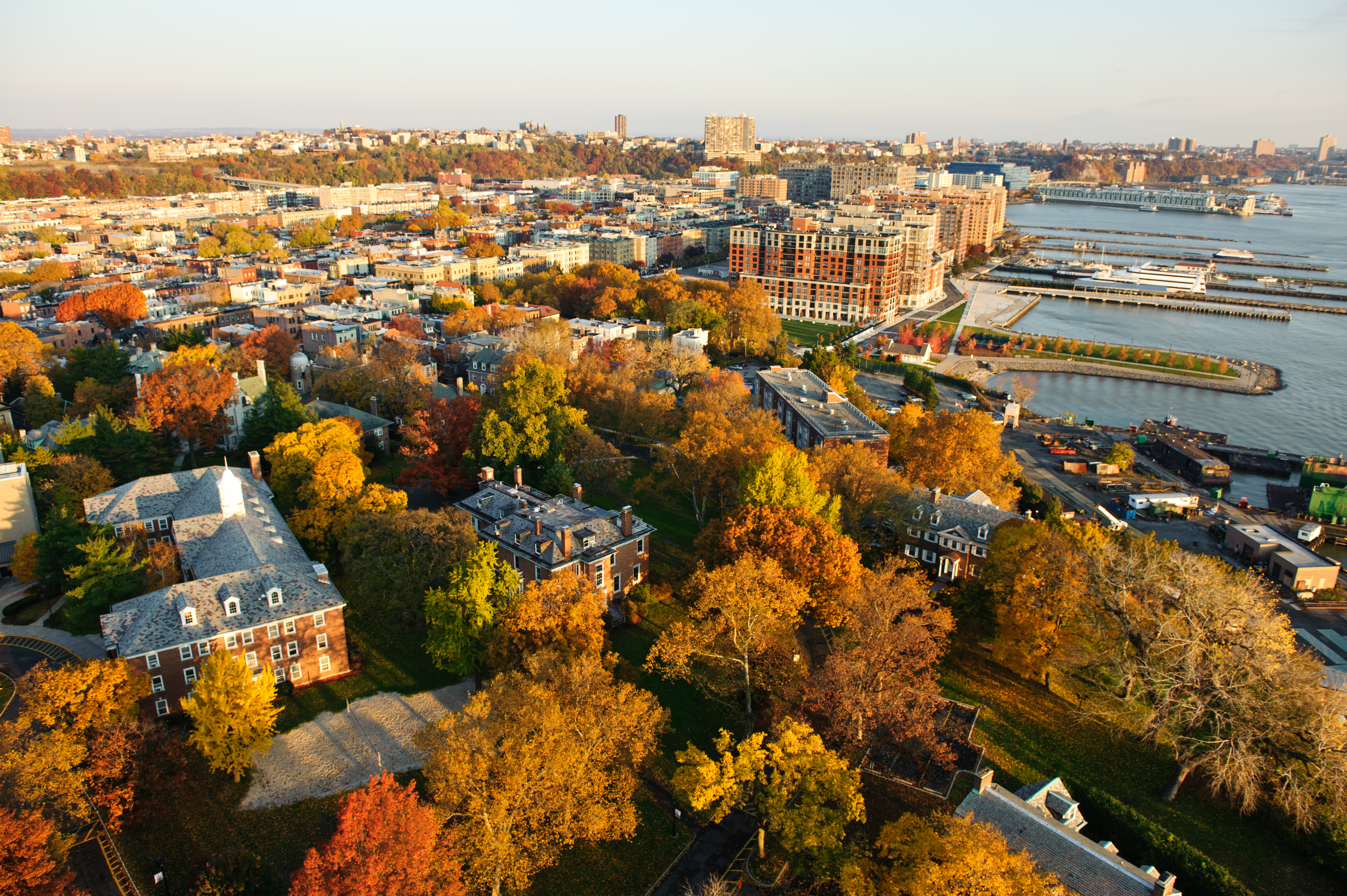
- Stevens Institute of Technology, home of the Davidson Laboratory
- Former name: Experimental Towing Tank
- Established: 1935; 91 years ago
- Laboratory type: Marine hydrodynamics laboratory
- Field of research: Marine hydrodynamics, naval architecture, ocean engineering
- Location: Hoboken, New Jersey, United States; 40.7449°N 74.0239°W
- Operating agency: Stevens Institute of Technology
- Website: stevens.edu/davidson-laboratory

Map
- Location within New Jersey

The Davidson Laboratory, previously the experimental towing laboratory, is a marine hydrodynamics and ocean engineering research facility at Stevens Institute of Technology in Hoboken, New Jersey, United States. It opened in 1935 as the Experimental Towing Tank and was one of the earliest ship model towing tanks in the United States. Research at the laboratory contributed to the development of the Savitsky method for predicting the performance of planing hulls.

== History ==
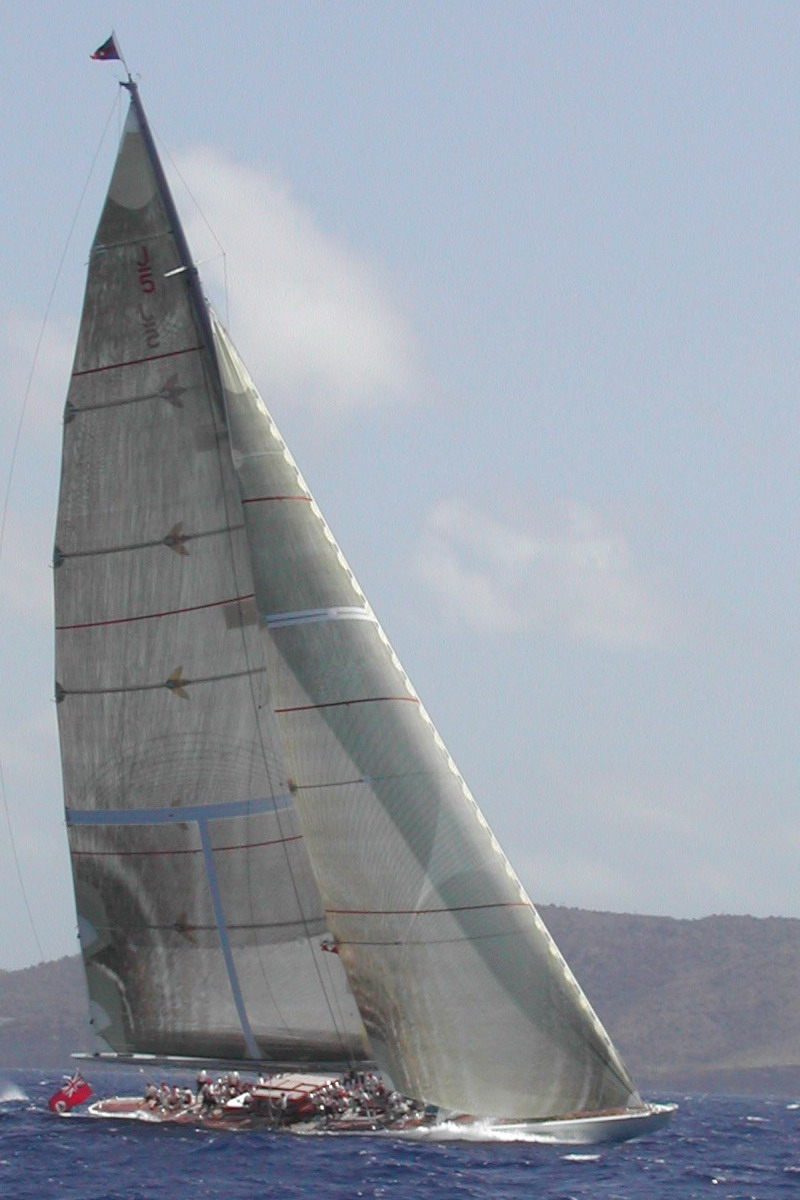
A replica of Ranger, the America's Cup J-class yacht tank-tested at the lab

Ship-model experiments at Stevens began in 1931. when Kenneth S. M. Davidson, a professor of mechanical engineering, tested scale models in the campus swimming pool. The Experimental Towing Tank opened in 1935 with Davidson as its director and was used to test sailing-yacht designs, among them the J-class Ranger, which won the 1937 America's Cup. During the Second World War the laboratory worked for the United States government, completing an indoor maneuvering basin in 1942 and a 313-foot high-speed towing tank in 1944, and testing ship and seaplane hull models, including flying-boat hull tests published by the National Advisory Committee for Aeronautics. It was renamed the Davidson Laboratory in 1959, after Davidson's death

== Research ==
After World War II, the laboratory carried out research on high-speed planing hulls, including work by Daniel Savitsky that led to the Savitsky method, and Navy-funded studies such as Gerard Fridsma's tests of planing boats in waves. It also tested model submarines and torpedoes and contributed to the design of the submarine USS Albacore, and it continued to test America's Cup yacht designs, including the 12-metre yacht Constellation in 1964. Its high-speed towing tank is 313 feet long, 12 feet wide and 6 feet deep and is fitted with a wave maker, and it has also been used to test coastal structures.
