= List of presidents of Stevens Institute of Technology =

Head of Stevens Institute of Technology

President of Stevens Institute of Technology
- Incumbent; Nariman Farvardin since July 1, 2011
- Appointer: Trustees of Stevens Institute of Technology
- Formation: 1870
- First holder: Henry Morton
- Website: Office of the President

The President of Stevens Institute of Technology leads Stevens Institute of Technology, a private research university in Hoboken, New Jersey. The board of trustees selects the president by ballot.

Founded in 1870, the Stevens Institute of Technology is one of the oldest technological universities in the United States and was the first college in America solely dedicated to mechanical engineering.

The president is an ex officio member of the board and presides at its meetings. One of five officers of the university's legal corporation, the Trustees of Stevens Institute of Technology, the president also acts as the chief executive officer. The president is tasked with "general charge and supervision over and responsibility for the affairs of the University and the direction of the University’s faculty". If the office is vacant the board shall then elect a new president, in the interim the chair may appoint an acting president.

The institution's first president was Henry Morton in 1870, and its 7th and current president is Nariman Farvardin, who was elected in 2011. All of Stevens' presidents have been male, two have been immigrants, and one has been an alumnus of the institution. Morton had the longest serving tenure at 32 years, while Farvardin has had the shortest tenure so far at 13 years. As of 2022, the annual compensation of the president was $1,603,757.

Since 1929, the president's official residence has been the Hoxie House, a three-story brick building fronted by a circular driveway and fountain. The residence is named after William Hoxie, a member of the class of 1889 who financed the building. At the laying of the cornerstone for Hoxie House, U.S. President Herbert Hoover sent his congratulations.

The president's office is located on the upper floors of the Wesley J. Howe Center, located at 1 Castle Point Terrace in Hoboken, NJ. Previously the site of the Stevens Family home, Castle Point.

== Presidents ==
List of presidents
No.	President	Presidency	Notes	Ref.
1	Henry Morton	1870-1902	University of Pennsylvania alumnus. Died from illness while in office.	
2	Alexander Crombie Humphreys	1902-1927	Stevens alumnus.	
3	Harvey Nathaniel Davis	1928–1951	Served as president of American Society of Mechanical Engineers(1938–1939). Harvard University alumnus.	
4	Jess Harrison Davis	1951-1972	The 8th president of Clarkson College of Technology (1948–1951).	
5	Kenneth Cannicott Rogers	1972–1987	Resigned to become commissioner of the Nuclear Regulatory Commission (1987–1997).	
–	Richard Griskey	1987	Served as acting president.	
6	Harold J. Raveché	1988–2011	Resigned following a settlement with the NJ Attorney General.	
7	Nariman Farvardin	2011–Present	Acting president of University of Maryland (2010). Rensselaer Polytechnic Institute alumnus.	

== Timeline ==
President of Stevens Institute of Technology • Acting President of Stevens Institute of Technology
