= Morton Memorial Laboratory of Chemistry =

- U.S. National Register of Historic Places
- New Jersey Register of Historic Places
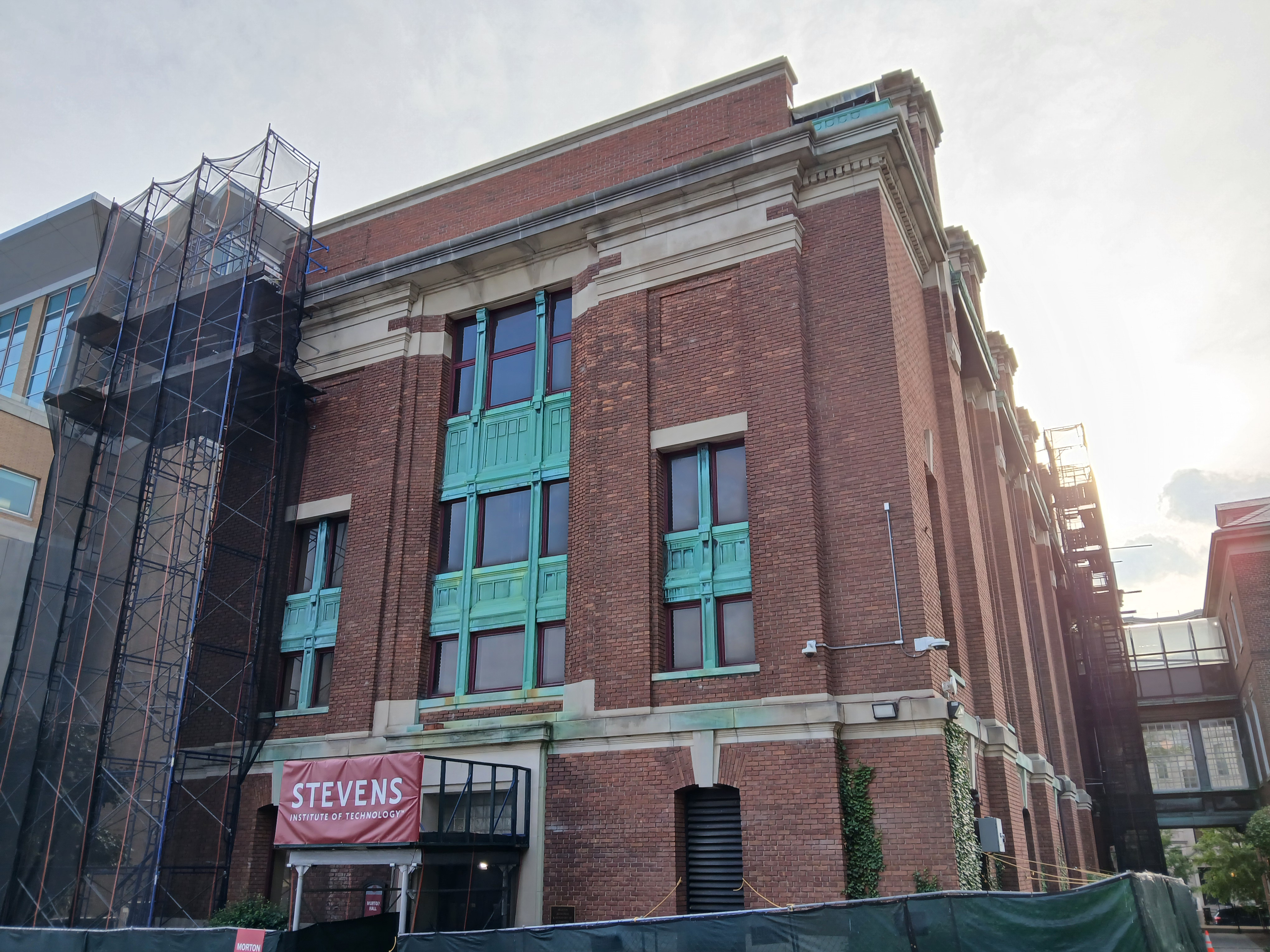

- Location within Hudson County, New Jersey Location within New Jersey Location within the United States
- Location: Sixth and River Streets; Hoboken, New Jersey
- Coordinates: 40°44′36″N 74°01′36″W
- Built: 1905–1906
- Architect: Ackerman & Partridge
- Architectural style: Classical Revival
- NRHP reference No.: 100007647
- NJRHP No.: 5827

Significant dates
- Added to NRHP: April 25, 2022
- Designated NJRHP: September 21, 2021

The Morton Memorial Laboratory of Chemistry is located on the campus of the Stevens Institute of Technology at Sixth and River Streets in the City of Hoboken in Hudson County, New Jersey. It was named after Henry Morton (1836–1902), the first president of the university. Built from 1905 to 1906, the building was added to the National Register of Historic Places on April 25, 2022, for its significance in architecture.

== See also ==
- National Register of Historic Places listings in Hudson County, New Jersey
