= Chang-Hwan Choi =

South Korean and American engineer

- Born: South Korea
- Education: Seoul National University (B.S., M.S.); Brown University (M.S.); University of California, Los Angeles (Ph.D.)
- Known for: Nanofabrication, Microfluidics/Nanofluidics, Surface Engineering
- Scientific career
- Fields: Mechanical Engineering, Nanotechnology, Surface Engineering
- Workplaces: Stevens Institute of Technology
- Website: Official Profile

Chang-Hwan Choi (Korean: 최창환; Hanja: 崔昌煥) is an American and South Korean engineer and professor specializing in nanofabrication, micro‐ and Nanofluidics, and surface engineering. He is currently a professor in the Department of Mechanical Engineering at Stevens Institute of Technology in Hoboken, New Jersey. His research focuses on developing micro/nanomanufacturing techniques and multifunctional surface technologies for applications in fluid mechanics, additive manufacturing, corrosion protection, and biomaterials.

== Early life and education ==
Choi completed his early studies in South Korea, earning his Bachelor of Science and a Master of Science degree in Aerospace Engineering from Seoul National University. He later pursued graduate studies in the United States, obtaining a second Master’s degree in Engineering, with a focus on fluid, thermal, and chemical processes, from Brown University, followed by a PhD in Mechanical Engineering from the University of California, Los Angeles (UCLA) in 2006.

== Academic career ==
Since joining Stevens Institute of Technology in 2007, and is now a full Professor.
