= Virginia P. Ruesterholz =

American businessperson

Chair of the Board of Trustees of Stevens Institute of Technology
- In office 2013–2018
- Preceded by: Lawrence Babbio Jr.
- Succeeded by: Stephen T. Boswell

Personal details
- Education: Stevens Institute of Technology (B.S.), New York University Tandon School of Engineering (M.S.)

Virginia P. Ruesterholz (born 1961) is a retired American business Executive. She is a former Executive Vice President of Strategic Initiatives of and president of Services Operations for Verizon Communications Inc. She began her career at New York Telephone in 1984.

She serves on the corporate boards of retailer Bed, Bath and Beyond and The Hartford Financial Services Group, Inc. She is also the former-chair and current trustee of the Board of Trustees of Stevens Institute of Technology.

She has a BS in Chemical Engineering and an honorary doctorate from Stevens Institute of Technology and a MS in telecommunication management from New York University Tandon School of Engineering.
