= Edwin A. Stevens Hall =

- U.S. National Register of Historic Places
- New Jersey Register of Historic Places

- Location within Hudson County, New Jersey Location within New Jersey Location within the United States
- Location: Fifth Street between Hudson and River Streets, Hoboken, New Jersey
- Coordinates: 40°44′32.7″N 74°01′39.8″W
- Area: 1 acre (0.40 ha)
- Built: 1870
- Architect: Richard Upjohn
- Architectural style: Gothic
- NRHP reference No.: 94000009
- NJRHP No.: 1477

Significant dates
- Added to NRHP: February 4, 1994
- Designated NJRHP: December 9, 1993

Edwin A. Stevens Hall is located in Hoboken, Hudson County, New Jersey, United States. The building was added to the National Register of Historic Places on February 4, 1994. It was designed by Richard Upjohn and built in 1870. It was named after Edwin Augustus Stevens and used as the main building for the Stevens Institute of Technology. The renowned DeBaun Auditorium, which is over 100 years old, is located in this building. The building is currently used as the Charles V. Schaefer, Jr. School of Engineering and Science.

== See also ==
- National Register of Historic Places listings in Hudson County, New Jersey
