= Henry Morton (scientist) =

American chemist

Henry Jackson Morton
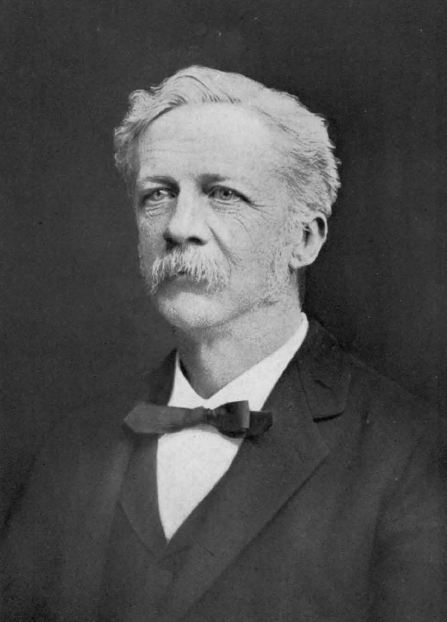

1st President of Stevens Institute of Technology
- In office 1870–1902
- Succeeded by: Alexander Crombie Humphreys

Personal details
- Born: December 11, 1836 Manhattan, New York
- Died: May 9, 1902 (aged 65) Hoboken, New Jersey
- Education: University of Pennsylvania

Henry Jackson Morton (December 11, 1836 – May 9, 1902) was an American scientist and the first president of the Stevens Institute of Technology.

== Education and early career ==
He was the son of Rev. Henry Morton (1807–1890), a clergyman who was rector of St. James's church in Philadelphia for many years and a trustee of the University of Pennsylvania. Henry J. Morton graduated from the University of Pennsylvania in 1857, and became professor of physics and chemistry at the Episcopal Academy of Philadelphia in 1860. In 1863, he delivered a series of lectures on chemistry at the Franklin Institute. A year later, he was appointed resident secretary at Franklin Institute, where he continued his lectures. His lectures on light attracted attention throughout the United States and Europe by reason of his brilliant and unique experiments. He continued as resident secretary until 1870.

He was one of the founders of the Philadelphia Dental College in 1863 and its first professor of chemistry. From 1867 to 1868, during the absence of John F. Frazer, he was invited to fill the chair of professor of physics and chemistry at the University of Pennsylvania. In 1869, the chair was divided, and Morton received the chemistry professorship. In 1867, he became editor of the Franklin Institute Journal. That same year, he was elected as a member to the American Philosophical Society.

He conducted the photographic branch of the United States eclipse expedition to Iowa in 1869, under the auspices of the U. S. Nautical Almanac office. In addition to securing several excellent photographs of the eclipse, he proved that the bright line of the sun's disc adjacent to the moon is due to a chemical action in the process of developing the plate and not to diffraction as had hitherto been proposed by Sir George B. Airy. Also he was a member of the private expedition that was organized by Henry Draper to observe the total solar eclipse of 29 July 1878 at Rawlins, Wyoming.

The degree of Ph.D. was conferred on him by Dickinson College in 1869, and by Princeton University in 1871. He was a member of scientific societies, and in 1874 was elected to membership in the National Academy of Sciences, on whose commissions he has occasionally served. Besides writing numerous papers on electricity and fluorescence, he assisted in the preparation of The Student's Practical Chemistry (1868). In 1859 he made the lithographic drawings for a publication of a translation of the trilingual hieroglyphic inscription of the Rosetta Stone.

In 1873 he conducted a series of researches on the "Fluorescent and Absorption Spectra of the Uranium Salts", and also on the like spectra of pyrene, and of a new material found by him in some petroleum residues to which he gave the name of thallene, from its brilliant green fluorescence. His reputation as a scientist became worldwide and his services as a chemical expert were eagerly sought in litigation. In 1878, he succeeded to the vacancy on the United States Lighthouse Board that was caused by the death of Joseph Henry, which appointment he held until 1885, conducting meanwhile investigations on fog signals, electric lighting, fire extinguishers, illuminating buoys, and like subjects, which appear in the annual reports of the board.

== Stevens Institute of Technology ==
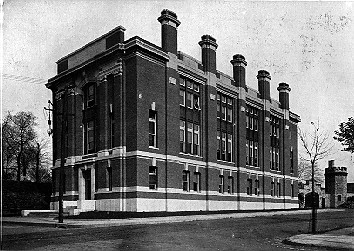
Morton Memorial Laboratory of Chemistry on the campus of Stevens Institute of Technology

In 1870, he was chosen president of the newly founded Stevens Institute of Technology, and under his direction the faculty was selected and the course of instruction formed. His management of the institute made it one of the leading technological schools of the country. He gave it the benefit not only of his great learning, but also several gifts in the establishment and endowment of various necessary departments: In 1880, he presented to the trustees a workshop that he had caused to be built and equipped with steam engines and tools at a cost of $10,000; again, in 1883, he gave $2,500 for the purchase of electrical apparatus.

=== Per aspera ad astra ===
Per Aspera ad Astra

What are those stars by rugged pathway gained?
And what the road by which they are attained?

Those stars are the rewards, the crowns, the goals,
The final dwellings of heroic souls;
Of those who life-long toil of hand and mind

Was freely given to uplift mankind,
To gather knowledge and develop arts,
To build up nations and make happy hearts;
Increasing comfort, lightening human toil,
From conquered nature winning richest spoil;
Guarding the weak from encroaching strong,
Rewarding virtue and preventing wrong.
On such as these are starry crowns bestowed,
For such as these the stars are fit abode.

Of the rough paths which lead to such rewards
Examples every noble life affords.
The Martyr gives his life, the Hero bleeds,
The Patriot strives with noble words and deeds.
The moral teachers and reformers give
Their lives of labor that the truth may live.
Students of nature work to age from youth
To bring to light some hidden gem of truth.
And countless laborers suffer, strive, refrain,
That from their work their fellow men may gain.

Nor need we travel far to other climes,
Or instance heroes of the classic times,
To find examples fitted to inspire
Loving respect and emulous desire.
The name of Stevens calls at once to mind
Three lives of willing labor, which, combined
Or singly, illustrate the upward road
Which straight ascends to that star-decked abode.
To affluence born, and tempted thus to give
First thought to self, and but for self to live,
Each one in turn, and all, this test withstood,
And gave their means and thought to general good.

The rapid steamer joining strand to strand,
The yet more rapid train across the land,
The iron rail on which the swift trains run,
The shell adapted to the long-range gun,
The iron-clad steamer ramming down the foe
With monster cannon loaded from below,
Those links which bind the world with bands of peace,
Those arms which in the end will make wars cease;
All these and many others, which have lent
So largely to the world's development,
Grew from Stevens lives, so richly fraught
With liberal outlay and ingenious thought.

And at the last what can we fitly say
Of him whose latest work we hail to-day?
Who, as a closing act of such career
As we have painted, sowed the seed which here
We see developed into fields of grain,
Loading with harvests many a distant plain.

Our Founder planted that which year by year
Has sent its fruitage far and near,
Till now there is no region where the sun
Uprising does not shine at least on one
Of Stevens' graduates doing useful work
In turning to good ends the powers which lurk
In force and matter, carrying far and near
The fair fame of the Stevens engineer,
And adding always to that special art
Which our good Founder had so much at heart.

For him the crowning stars long since were won,
For us they still are to be gazed upon.
Before us still stands the rugged road
Which must be climbed to reach the blessed abode.
On his example let us fix our eyes,
And, following in his footsteps, ever rise;
Scale each obstruction which our pathway bars,
And win at last a home among the stars.

— Henry J. Morton

Morton frequently dabbled in poetry; he delivered the Valedictory speech for his University class of 1857 in verse. Throughout his life he would compose lengthy poems related to events in his life. In celebration of the Twenty-fifth Anniversary Celebration of Stevens Institute of Technology, Morton prepared a poem based on the Stevens Family motto "Per Aspera ad Astra".
