= Harold J. Raveché =

American educator and consultant

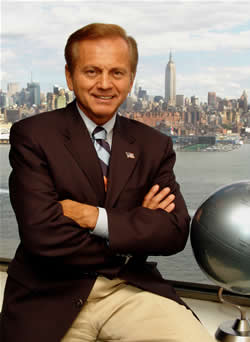
- Harold J. Raveché

6th President of Stevens Institute of Technology
- In office 1988–2010
- Preceded by: Kenneth C. Rogers
- Succeeded by: Nariman Farvardin

Personal details
- Born: March 18, 1943 (age 83) Brooklyn, New York
- Education: University of California at San Diego
- Profession: Educator, Consultant
- Website: www.innostrategies.com

Harold Joseph Raveché (born March 18, 1943) was the sixth President of Stevens Institute of Technology in Hoboken, New Jersey. He is the founder and president of Innovation Strategies International, a global education-innovation consulting firm.

== Education and early career ==
Raveché was born in Brooklyn, New York. He earned his Bachelor of Science degree in chemistry at Hofstra University in 1963. He then earned a PhD in physical chemistry and statistical mechanics from the University of California at San Diego, where his research was in statistical mechanics.

Following his PhD work at UCSD, Raveché was awarded a research fellowship working with Melville S. Green at the National Institute of Standards and Technology (NIST), and then accepted a research chemist position. At the NIST, he founded the thermodynamics division and conducted a federal study on supercomputing.

In 1985 Raveché was named Dean of Science at Rensselaer Polytechnic Institute, where he helped restructure their Science Initiatives Program to advance science education and helped increase the program’s federal research grants to $9 million. He also attracted 27 new faculty members from institutions such as the National Academy of Sciences and Duke and Columbia Universities.

== Stevens Institute of Technology ==
In 1988, Raveché was named president of Stevens Institute of Technology to replace Kenneth C. Rogers, who joined the Nuclear Regulatory Commission. His goals upon accepting the position included: increasing the number of guest lecturers to enhance students’ interest in the sciences, improving the university’s national reputation, and encouraging students to participate in research projects. Raveché also hoped to improve the students’ communication skills with humanities courses and to develop courses in polymer processing and the analysis of coastal lands and the coastal ecology.

At Stevens, Raveché connected the university’s research programs with business and government to encourage technology development. He promoted Stevens’ trademarked Technogenesis education process, in which students learn how to commercialize the university’s research and ideas.

Raveché also emphasized the importance of a well-rounded student experience at Stevens. He expanded the Scholar-Athlete program and oversaw the renovation of student dormitories and the construction of new buildings, including the Lawrence T. Babbio, Jr. Center for Technology Management and the Rocco Technology Center.

As president of the Stevens Institute of Technology, Raveché led the foundation of a private university in the Dominican Republic, called Stevens Institute of Technology International.

=== Political prospects ===
A self-described pro-business moderate Republican, Raveché was mentioned as a possible contender in the Republican primary elections for the New Jersey governor’s race as early as 2005, and again in 2009. Also in 2009, he was asked to run for the seat of retiring New Jersey Senior Congressman, and Republican stalwart, H. James Saxton. A resident of Saxton’s 3rd Congressional District, Raveché respectfully declined to enter the race in order to continue in his role as president of Stevens.

=== Allegations by New Jersey Attorney General ===
On September 17, 2009, New Jersey Attorney General Anne Milgram announced charges against Raveché and the Stevens board of trustees chairman Lawrence T. Babbio, Jr. According to the state's 16-count lawsuit, Stevens' leaders allegedly kept several trustees in the dark about the school's financial condition.

The lawsuit alleged that Raveché and Babbio misrepresented the finances of the school and caused the endowment to fall by $42 million from $157 million in 2000 to $115 million in 2009. The lawsuit also contended that Raveché received below-market loans from the school, at least some of which were forgiven by Stevens, and questioned Raveché's salary compared to the president of Massachusetts Institute of Technology, a larger, better known school.

The school denied the allegations, brought a preemptive lawsuit against the State of New Jersey, and contended that the state attorney general had overstepped her legal authority. The Stevens trustees also sought unsuccessfully to keep the Attorney General's lawsuit confidential. In December 2009, the New York Times ran an editorial calling for the Stevens case to be pursued vigorously after the end of Anne Milgram term of office.

On January 15, 2010, a settlement was reached between the school and the Attorney General's office. The Final Consent Judgment stated in part that "the Parties have reached an amicable agreement resolving the issues in controversy and concluding this action without trial, adjudication, or any admission of liability or unlawful conduct by any Party." As a part of the settlement, Raveché agreed to step down as president at the end of the 2010 school year and agreed to repay the remainder of the mortgage which the school had extended to him. Other terms of the agreement were focused on limiting the influence of the school's president over committees of the board, designed to promote transparency of operation, and to forestall future allegations of perceived misconduct. Raveché was succeeded by Nariman Farvardin.

== Innovation Strategies International ==
After leaving Stevens, Raveché founded Innovation Strategies International, a consulting firm which assists universities, corporations and government agencies with entrepreneurship and innovation. Raveché was the longtime science and technology adviser to President Leonel Fernandez of the Dominican Republic. Raveché also served as entrepreneur-in-residence at the National University of Malaysia, and lectures on innovation in Singapore, Sri Lanka, India, Vietnam, Taiwan and Korea. Raveché also occasionally writes on topics of geopolitics, technology, military preparedness and national security. In 2014 Raveché was appointed by Beneficial Holdings, Inc., as an independent member of its board of directors. He has been on the board of directors of several electronics, power-generation and financial organizations.
