= Nariman Farvardin =

Iranian-American engineer and educator

7th President of Stevens Institute of Technology
- Incumbent
- Assumed office July 1, 2011
- Preceded by: Harold J. Raveché

President at University of Maryland
- Interim
- In office September 1, 2010 – October 31, 2010
- Preceded by: Dan Mote
- Succeeded by: Wallace Loh

Personal details
- Born: July 15, 1956 (age 70) Tehran, Imperial State of Iran
- Education: Rensselaer Polytechnic Institute
- Scientific career
- Fields: Electrical engineering
- Workplaces: University of Maryland; Stevens Institute of Technology
- Thesis: Rate-distortion performance of optimum entropy-constrained quantizers (1983)

Nariman Farvardin (born July 15, 1956) is an Iranian-American engineer and educator, currently serving as president of Stevens Institute of Technology, Hoboken, New Jersey. Formerly senior vice president for academic affairs, provost and acting president at the University of Maryland, College Park, he assumed office at Stevens on July 1, 2011.

== Education and early career ==
Farvardin was born in Tehran, Iran. He holds bachelor's, master's, and doctoral degrees in electrical engineering from Rensselaer Polytechnic Institute. In 1984, one year after earning his doctorate, he joined the faculty of the University of Maryland's Department of Electrical and Computer Engineering. In 1994, he became chair of the department, holding that position for six years before being appointed dean of the Clark School of Engineering. Farvardin succeeded William Destler as provost of the University of Maryland in May 2007.

In late 2010, he became acting president at University of Maryland, succeeding Dan Mote, and held the post until November 1, 2010, when Wallace Loh became president of the University of Maryland.

Farvardin was made a fellow of the National Academy of Inventors and the Institute of Electrical and Electronics Engineers for contributions to source coding and quantization, holds seven U.S. patents and has co-authored more than 150 technical papers in industry journals and conference proceedings. His major research interests include information theory, signal compression and applications of signal compression to speech, image and video coding for wireless communication networks.

Farvardin co-founded two companies. Zagros Networks, which shared the same name as a mountain range in Iran where Farvardin was born, developed computer chips for networks. NovaTherm Technologies developed innovations to improve the energy efficiency of buildings. He has been honored with the National Science Foundation's Presidential Young Investigator Award, the George Corcoran Award for Outstanding Contributions to Electrical Engineering Education and the Invention of the Year Award (Information Sciences) from the University of Maryland. He has cited Claude Shannon as his foremost historical influence.

== President of Stevens Institute of Technology, 2011-present ==
In July 2011, Farvardin left the University of Maryland to become the seventh president of Stevens Institute of Technology in Hoboken, New Jersey. He joined Stevens at the close of a challenging period in the university's history, during which the New Jersey attorney general investigated the institution's leadership for mismanagement. Farvardin was tasked with ensuring that the university adhered to the terms of a settlement between Stevens and the attorney general's office in 2010 in addition to developing and meeting the goals of the university's new ten-year strategic plan, The Future. Ours to Create.

The plan, launched in 2012, sought to elevate the university's profile as a "premier, student-centric technological university." Under Farvardin's leadership, Stevens met or exceeded almost all goals by 2022, with accomplishments including:

- 67 percent increase in undergraduate enrollment
  - Including 98 percent increase in the number of women undergraduates and 149 percent increase in the number of underrepresented minorities in the undergraduate cohort
- 97 percent of the Class of 2021 secured career outcomes in intended fields within six months of graduation
- 73 percent increase in graduate FTE enrollment
- 38 percent increase in full-time faculty and lecturers.

These achievements were supported in part by philanthropic gifts made to the $200 million Power of Stevens campaign, which closed in 2021. Through the campaign, Stevens added 158 new scholarships and 18 new faculty fellowships.

Since Farvardin's arrival in 2011, Stevens has focused on expanding and enhancing the physical and technological infrastructure of the campus while maintaining a commitment to sustainability. This included upgrading the IT and AV capabilities of 100 percent of the classrooms on campus and building the University Center Complex, Gateway Academic Center, American Bureau of Shipping Engineering Center, Ruesterholz Admissions Center, Hanlon Financial Systems Center, Lore-El Center for Women's Leadership and Student Wellness Center. The Association for the Advancement of Sustainability in Higher Education (AASHE) recognized Stevens with its STARS Gold rating for its classroom and campus operations. In 2021, Stevens announced it would begin sourcing 100 percent of its power from local renewable sources, becoming one of only a few universities fully operating on clean electricity.

Farvardin has become a vocal advocate for achieving a better return on investment in American higher education. In 2018, Stevens was ranked No. 15 in the United States for return on investment by PayScale. In a 2021 editorial published by University Business, Farvardin proposed a new approach to the concept of a well-rounded education: "Students follow their passions and major in fields that excite them and draw on their interests. However, it is imperative that colleges prepare their graduates for careers in an increasingly technology-driven world. Those are the schools that will continue to provide a significant ROI."

Throughout the COVID-19 pandemic, Stevens was a leader in pandemic response tactics and vaccine requirements among New Jersey higher education institutions and those across the country. Farvardin gave several state and national interviews, including to Fox News and NBC, when Stevens became one of the first institutions to mandate vaccination for students, faculty and staff to return for on-campus instruction and work.

In recognition of Stevens' growth and Farvardin's leadership, the American Council on Education recognized the university with its 2018 ACE/Fidelity Investments Award for Institutional Transformation. The award is given to "institutions that have responded to higher education challenges in innovative and creative ways and achieved dramatic changes in a relatively short period."

Farvardin has received several other awards recognizing his leadership as Stevens president. These include CEO of the Year in 2013 from the New Jersey Tech Council, Educator of the Year in 2016 from the Research Development Council of New Jersey, the Carnegie Academic Leadership Award in 2017, and inclusion on the NJBIZ Education Power50 list in 2021.
