= Alexander Crombie Humphreys =

American academic administrator (1851–1927)

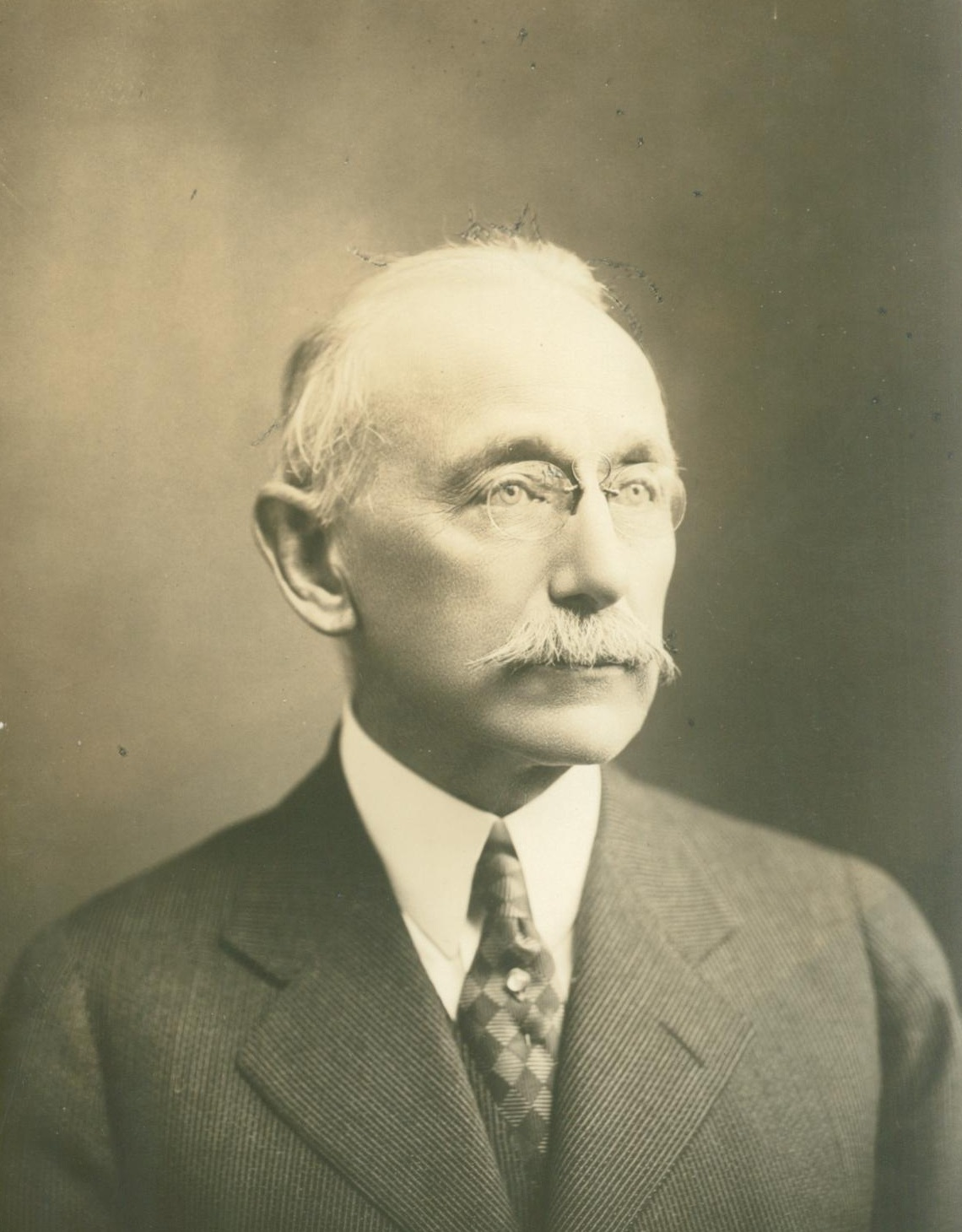
- Alexander Crombie Humphreys

2nd President of Stevens Institute of Technology
- In office 1902–1927
- Preceded by: Henry Morton
- Succeeded by: Harvey Davis

Personal details
- Born: 30 March 1851 Edinburgh, Scotland
- Died: 14 August 1927 (aged 76) Morristown, New Jersey
- Education: Stevens Institute of Technology

Alexander Crombie Humphreys (30 March 1851 – 14 August 1927) was a Scottish American mechanical and consulting engineer, along with a water-gas plant builder, and the 2nd President of Stevens Institute of Technology in Hoboken, New Jersey.

== Biography ==
=== Education and early career ===
Humphreys was born in Edinburgh, Scotland on 30 March 1851 to Edward Rupert Humphreys, an English classical scholar and profound educator, and Margaret McNutt of Prince Edward Island. He attended his father's school in Boston after coming to the United States in 1859.

At the age of fourteen he received an appointment and passed preliminary entrance exams for the United States Naval Academy before the academy discovered he was too young to complete entrance. He instead began working for insurance companies and was made Secretary-Treasurer of the New York Guaranty and Indemnity Company by 1872, he became superintendent shortly thereafter. He later became superintendent of the Bayonne and Greenville Gas Light Company and attended Stevens Institute of Technology earning his degree in mechanical engineering; he graduated in 1881.

Humphreys had enough determination to finish the prescribed coursework in four years while attending class only two days a week, acting as superintendent of the Trinity Episcopal Church's Sunday school, Treasurer and Vestry of the congregation, trustee of the Bayonne Board of Education and foreman of the Bayonne Fire Department.

In 1892 he founded Humphreys & Glasgow, Engineering, London and New York with Arthur G. Glasgow, also a Stevens alum. Humphreys continued his career with the Pintsch Lighting Company of New York, the United Gas Improvement Company, and the Weisbach Incandescent Gas Company.

=== Family ===
In April 1872 he married Miss Eva Guillandeu of Bergen Point, NJ. They had three children in total: Harold, Crombie and Dorothy Caroline Humphreys-Turnbull. In memory of his son Harold, who was also the first son of a Stevens alumnus to graduate from the college, he endowed the Harold Humphreys Scholarship in 1902. In memory of Crombie, who drowned with Harold in the Nile in 1901, the Crombie Humphreys Scholarship in 1904.

In 1927, Alexander Crombie Humphreys lost a battle with cancer. His death came two years after serving as President of his Alma mater for a quarter of a century, and chairman of the board of trustees for two years. The only immediate family member to outlive him was his daughter.

== Stevens Institute of Technology ==
Following the death of Henry Morton in 1902, the board of trustees of Stevens Institute of Technology unanimously called upon Humphreys to serve his Alma mater as president. Prior to his presidency, Humphreys was elected a trustee of the institute on 23 December 1891 and served as chair of the Stevens Alumni Association from 1883 to 1886. Humphreys developed the institute as one of the first technical schools in the United States. At his inauguration in 1902 he outlined his plans for the university emphasizing that students must be "thoroughly and completely trained in the fundamentals required in the practice of their profession." As an alum, Humphreys was known to stand by and defend the history of the school engaging in public retort with those who failed to recognize the Institute or family's contributions.

=== Expansion of Campus ===
During a dinner following his inauguration, Colonel Edwin A. Stevens, Jr., son of the school's founder Edwin A. Stevens, presented the institute with a plot of land on which to construct a dormitory.

Upon assuming the office of President, Humphreys requested of Andrew Carnegie the financial support to construct a new building. He followed this with an address to the Board of Trustees urging construction of the Morton Laboratory of Chemistry, a dormitory, a gymnasium and library – a "crying need of the Institute".

As a homage to his predecessor, Humphreys campaigned for the creation of the Morton Memorial Chemistry Laboratory and commissioned a book on Stevens' founding and its early years to be named in his honor. These initiatives were but foreshadowing of the growth Humphreys would bring to Stevens. By 1924 the campus grew from just over a city block to 23-acres, enrollment quadrupled and endowment grew to $2,864,000 (from $384,800 when Humprheys took office). That year also marked the successful end of the "Million Dollar Campaign", which had attracted donations from alumni as well as George Eastman and Edward Harkness.

In 1909, Stevens seized the opportunity to acquire Castle Point from Richard Stevens inclusive of the prominent Stevens Family Castle constructed in 1853; the purchase was primarily funded by the Carnegie Foundation and John D. Rockefeller Educational Fund. This came within months of acquiring the land adjacent to present-day 8th street upon which fraternity houses were constructed that stand to this day.

In 1960 the Institute expanded again and constructed two residence halls, one of which bared his name.

=== Engineering Economics ===
During the growth of the institute, Alexander C. Humphreys felt it important to impart engineering students with a sense of business – a tool that would be essential in their success in all lines of manufacturing. He began teaching the first courses on this topic in 1903 and is regarded as the father of Engineering Economics.

To honor his contributions, Stevens Institute of Technology endows an Alexander Crombie Humphreys Chair in Economics of Engineering.

=== The Honor System ===
During the dinner of his inauguration, Humphreys announced that one of his ambitions was to start an Honor System at Stevens to cover academic work. Humphreys was very adamant that the creation of such a system come from the students and on the first page of the first issue of the school newspaper "The Stute" appeared an article written by a junior urging the implementation of such. By 1908 the students created a self run Honor Board who was charged with investigating cases, bringing up charges, judging cases by a vote and recommend punishments to the faculty. Upon Humphreys' recommendation, faculty were also required to abide by such a pledge in administering exams within Honor Board guidelines on the grounds that it is a "...proviso apply[ing] to the examiner as well as to the student".

== Selected publications ==
- Humphreys, Alexander Crombie. Inaugural address of Alex. C. Humphreys, Stevens Institute of Technology, 1903.
- Humphreys, Alexander Crombie. Lecture notes on some of the business features of engineering practice, Hoboken, N.J., Dept. of Economics of Engineering, Stevens Institute of Technology. 1912.
