= Stevens Institute of Technology =

Private university in Hoboken, New Jersey, U.S.

- Motto: Per aspera ad astra (Latin)
- Motto in English: "Through adversity to the stars"
- Type: Private research university
- Established: February 15, 1870; 156 years ago
- Accreditation: MSCHE
- Academic affiliations: AITU; NAICU; UARC; sea-grant; space-grant
- Endowment: $387.7 million (2025)
- President: Nariman Farvardin
- Provost: Jianmin Qu
- Faculty: 354 full-time (2025-2026)
- Students: 8,367 (fall 2025)
- Undergraduates: 4,206 (fall 2025)
- Postgraduates: 4,161 (fall 2025)
- Location: Hoboken, New Jersey, United States; 40.744906°N 74.023937°W
- Campus: 55 acres (22 ha); Large suburb
- Newspaper: The Stute
- Colors: Red and gray
- Nickname: Ducks
- Sporting affiliations: NCAA Division III – MAC; Freedom; MACFA; EWFC; NIFWA
- Mascot: Attila the Duck
- Website: stevens.edu

Stevens Institute of Technology is a private research university in Hoboken, New Jersey, United States. Founded in 1870, it is one of the oldest technological universities in the United States and was the first college in America solely dedicated to mechanical engineering. The 55-acre campus encompasses Castle Point, the highest point in Hoboken, a quad, and 43 academic, student and administrative buildings.

Established through an 1868 bequest from Edwin Augustus Stevens, enrollment at Stevens includes more than 8,000 undergraduate and graduate students representing 47 states and 60 countries throughout Asia, Europe and Latin America. Stevens comprises four academic schools that deliver technology-based STEM degrees and degrees in business, arts, humanities and social sciences: the Charles V. Schaefer, Jr. School of Engineering and Science; the School of Business; the School of computing; and the School of Humanities, Arts and Social Sciences. The university also operates the College of Online and Professional Education, established in 2023. For undergraduates, Stevens offers the Bachelor of Engineering (B.E.), Bachelor of Science (B.S.) and Bachelor of Arts (B.A.). At the graduate level, Stevens offers programs in engineering, science, systems, engineering, management and the liberal arts. Graduate students can pursue advanced degrees in more than 50 different designations ranging from graduate certificates and master's degrees to Ph.D. levels.

Stevens is classified among "R2: Doctoral Universities – High research activity". The university is home to two national Centers of Excellence as designated by the U.S. Department of Defense and U.S. Department of Homeland Security.

== History ==
=== Establishment and the Stevens family (1868–1870) ===
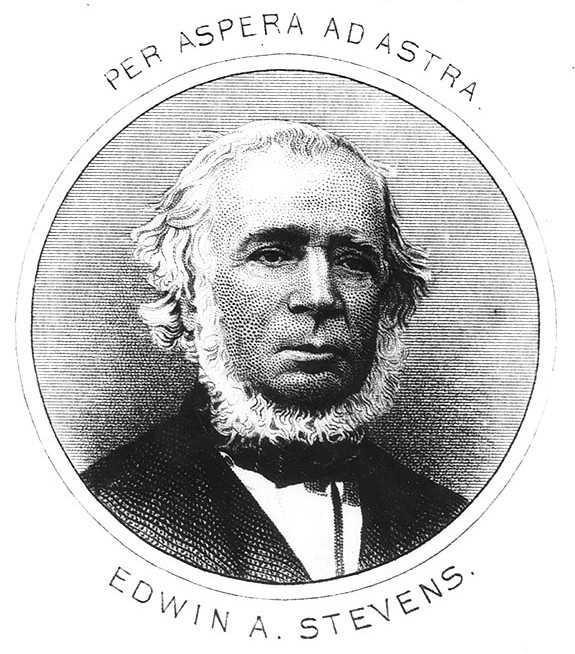
Edwin Stevens

In 1868, Edwin Augustus Stevens died. In his will, he left a bequest for the establishment of an "institution of learning," providing his trustees with land and funds. Edwin's will was executed by surviving wife, Martha Bayard Stevens, who would also serve as a lifetime trustee of the institute that now bears the family's name. Martha and her brother, Samuel Bayard Dod, are responsible for much of the organization for the institute including the hiring of the first president, Henry Morton. Dod became the first president of the board of trustees, serving until his death in 1907.

The land now occupied by Stevens Institute of Technology was purchased at public auction by John Stevens in 1784. John Stevens was a Revolutionary War Colonel, Continental Congressman, first Treasurer of New Jersey, father of American patent law, steamboat and rail locomotive engineer, and father to Edwin. John built his estate on Castle Point, the Stevens Castle which served as the home to the Stevens family until 1917 when the building was offered to the U.S. Government for WW1 while the family resided in another building on the estate. The Stevens Mansion was then acquired by the university and used as an administrative building until 1959 when the Wesley J. Howe Center was built on its location.

The Stevens family - "America's First Family of inventors" - was influential in founding the university, its early leadership as trustees, and the institute's surrounding community, Hoboken. Edwin A. Stevens' bequest totaled a city block's worth of land, $150,000 for the construction of a building, and a $500,000 endowment.

=== Early years ===
Stevens Institute of Technology opened in 1870, offering a rigorous engineering curriculum grounded in scientific principles and the humanities. The original course of study was a single, rigorous curriculum based upon the European Polytechnic model of engineering science (following the French and German scientific and polytechnic schools), rather than the shop schools that were common at that time. The original degree offered was the mechanical engineer (M.E.), in addition to a Ph.D. in mechanical engineering, chemistry and physics. Stevens granted several doctoral degrees between 1870 and 1900, making it one of the earliest Ph.D.-granting institutions in the United States. The broad-based interdisciplinary philosophy was put into practice by the founders from the first graduating class. Despite the title of the degree and concentration in mechanical engineering, the curriculum included courses in all engineering disciplines of the time: mechanical, civil, chemical and electrical. In 1880, Robert H. Thurston, professor of mechanical engineering, was nominated the first president of the American Society of Mechanical Engineers.

The campus was situated at the periphery of the family estate at Castle Point in Hoboken. It occupied a single building now designated Edwin A. Stevens Hall, which was added to the National Register of Historic Places in 1994. Stone designs on the building's facade are believed to be derived from a pattern repeated in the floor mosaic of Hagia Sophia, the great cathedral in Istanbul, which Edwin Stevens is believed to have visited in the late 19th century.

=== 1900–1999 ===
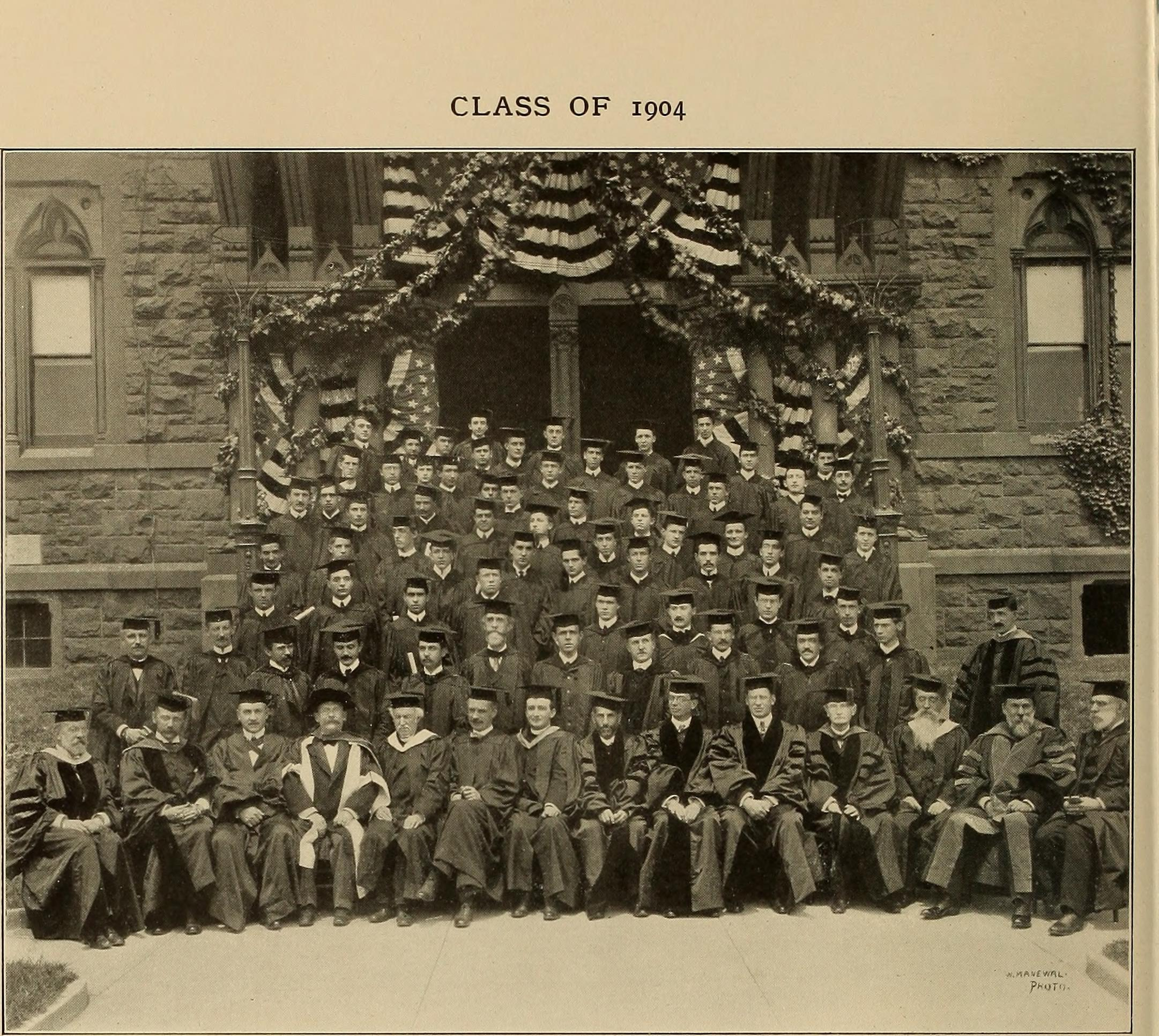
Class of 1904

In its first century, Stevens grew quickly, evolving from a small, four-year undergraduate engineering college into a comprehensive technological university with strengths in key fields such as quantum computing, artificial intelligence, resilience engineering, robotics, complex systems, healthcare, biomedical research, brain research and fintech. The university's alumni included a Nobel Prize winner (Frederick Reines 1939 M.S. 1941) and its faculty produced thousands of new technologies, products, services, and research insights.

In 1906, students, under the guidance of President A.C. Humphreys, created the honor system – a moral and ethical code governing the life of Stevens students and preaching equality and honest work. The student-run system still exists to this day, in which the accused are tried by their peers with a punishment recommended to the faculty. Stevens was the first technical school to implement such a system.

During World War II, Stevens Institute of Applied Science was one of 131 colleges and universities nationally that took part in the V-12 Navy College Training Program which offered students a path to a Navy commission. During this time, the institute was also honored by the naming of the Victory Ship, SS Stevens Victory, a merchant cargo ship built by the Bethlehem Fairfield Shipyard at Baltimore. Launched on May 29, 1945, the ship was one of 150 named for U.S. colleges and universities.

In 1959, the undergraduate engineering degree was changed to the bachelor of engineering (B.E.) to reflect the broad-based interdisciplinary engineering curriculum (the M.E. degree of that time was a baccalaureate degree, not to be confused with the present engineer's degree, which is a terminal professional graduate degree).

Also in 1959, the land occupied by the 40-room Victorian mansion, "Castle Stevens" or "Villa on the Hudson", was repurposed for the 14-story administration building completed in 1962, later renamed the Wesley J. Howe Building. Serving as a campus building since in 1911, it was used as a dormitory, cafeteria, and office space. The unsupported cantilevered staircase, with its elegant hand-carved balustrade, was one of only two such "floating staircases" in America.

Stevens' graduate program admitted women for the first time in 1967. Undergraduate women were first admitted in 1971. The Lore-El Center for Women's Leadership promotes the empowerment of women at Stevens.

In 1982, Stevens became the first institution in the U.S. to require all incoming first-year undergraduate students to purchase and use a personal computer. Around this time, an intranet was installed throughout campus, which placed Stevens among the first universities with a campus network.

WCPR: Castle Point Radio, the radio station of Stevens Institute of Technology since 1961, has over 10,000 LPs, one of the largest record collections in New Jersey.

=== 2000 and beyond ===
Stevens has continued to grow since the turn of the millennium, expanding its enrollment, facilities, partnerships and research programs. The university's collaborations with industry and government include numerous grant awards, contracts and collaborative projects, as well as two National Centers of Excellence designated by the U.S. Department of Homeland Security and Department of Defense.

In 2009, after a two-year investigation by the New Jersey attorney general, Stevens and the attorney general filed competing lawsuits against one another. The Stevens suit against the attorney general contended that she had overstepped her legal authority over a private institution and sought that any case be pursued by confidential arbitration. The attorney general suit against Stevens, its then-president, Harold J. Raveché, and chairman of the board of trustees, Lawrence Babbio Jr., now referred to as the attorney general matter or allegations of the attorney general. On January 15, 2010, a settlement was reached in which Raveché was ordered to repay the low-interest loans offered to him by the university and increased oversight by the state of New Jersey until 2016. The president and chairman stepped down shortly after, succeeded by Nariman Farvardin and Virginia P. Ruesterholz, respectively. It concluded with no admission of liability or unlawful conduct by any party.

Since 2010, undergraduate enrollment has increased 67 percent and full-time graduate enrollment has increased 73 percent. Stevens has adapted and expanded to accommodate that growth, with a focus on modernizing campus facilities and infrastructure. Under the 2012–22 university strategic plan, Stevens made AV and IT upgrades to 100 percent of its classrooms. Improvements also included two new anchor facilities. The Gateway Academic Center, an 89,500-square-foot teaching and research facility, opened in 2019. In 2022, Stevens opened the University Center Complex, providing residential housing for approximately 1,000 students, as well as a campus hub with meeting, collaboration, event spaces, a fitness center and dining facilities.

Stevens has also focused on increasing access and opportunity for students from underrepresented groups. Among undergraduates, there was a 98 percent increase in women and 149 percent increase in the number of underrepresented minorities between 2011 and 2021. Initiatives developed to provide financial, academic and professional development support for students – including the Accessing Careers in Engineering and Science (ACES), A. James Clark Scholars and Lawrence T. Babbio Pinnacle Scholars programs – have played a role in this growth.

In recognition of the progress Stevens made through its strategic plan, the American Council on Education presented the university with its 2018 ACE/Fidelity Investments Award for Institutional Transformation. The award is given to "institutions that have responded to higher education challenges in innovative and creative ways and achieved dramatic changes in a relatively brief period."

Stevens was named one of the healthiest campuses in the nation by Active Minds, a national nonprofit dedicated to student wellness. It has also been recognized for its commitments to environmental sustainability, including receiving the Association for the Advancement of Sustainability in Higher Education (AASHE) STARS Gold Rating in 2020. In 2021, Stevens announced it would source 100 percent of its electricity from renewable energy starting in that year's fall semester.

In April 2021, Stevens became one of the first higher education institutions in the United States to require COVID-19 vaccination not only for students, but also faculty and staff. In December 2021, the university announced it would require all students, faculty and staff to receive the COVID-19 booster vaccine to be compliant with the rule.

In January 2026, the board of trustees approved the establishment of the Stevens School of Computing, the institute's fifth academic school, supported by an initial $36 million in philanthropic gifts and scheduled to launch in fall 2026.

=== Stevens Institute of Technology International ===
Stevens Institute of Technology International
- Motto: Ad Prosperitas Per Reperio (To Prosperity through Invention)
- Type: Private
- Active: 2006–2016; 10 years ago
- Parent institution: Stevens Institute of Technology
- Location: Santo Domingo, Dominican Republic
- Colors: (garnet and blue)
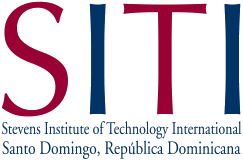

Stevens Institute of Technology International (SITI; Spanish: Stevens Instituto Especializado de Estudios Superiores) is a defunct private university in the Dominican Republic that offered technology and technology management education, taught in English. The school was founded on July 18, 2006, and was associated with Stevens Institute of Technology. SITI opened its doors on September 28, 2007. Its campus was at the Parque Cibernetico de Santo Domingo. SITI offered master's degrees in Information Systems and Manufacturing Technology. These programs required 40 credits including a masters thesis.

Harold J. Raveché, then President of the Stevens Institute of Technology, served as the Rector of SITI; the Vice-Rector was Lex McCusker, then Associate Dean of the Wesley J. Howe School of Technology Management at Stevens. Raveché left Stevens in 2010, and in 2016 its corporate charter was dissolved.

== Campus ==
External videos
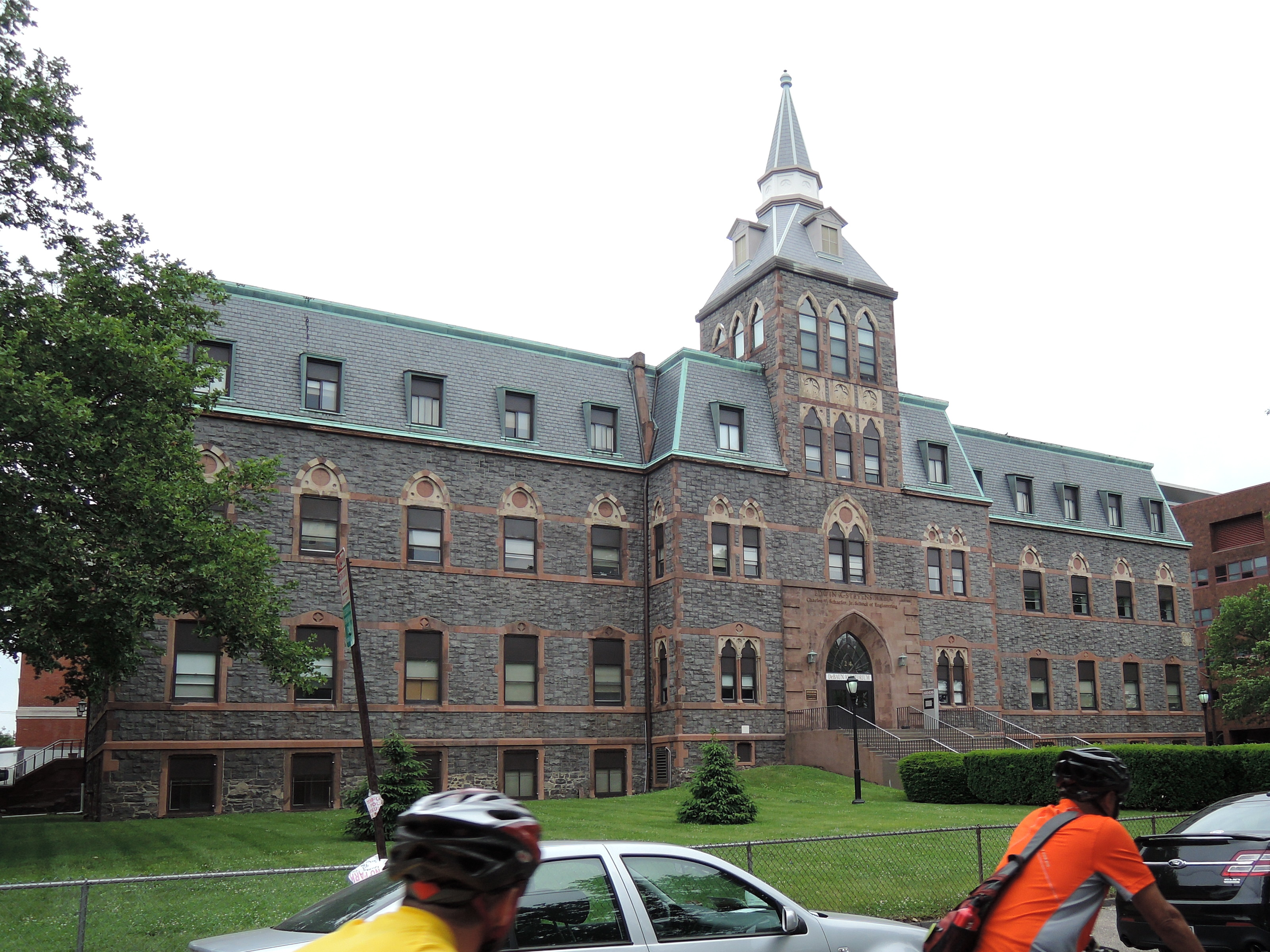
- Stevens Institute of Technology campus tour

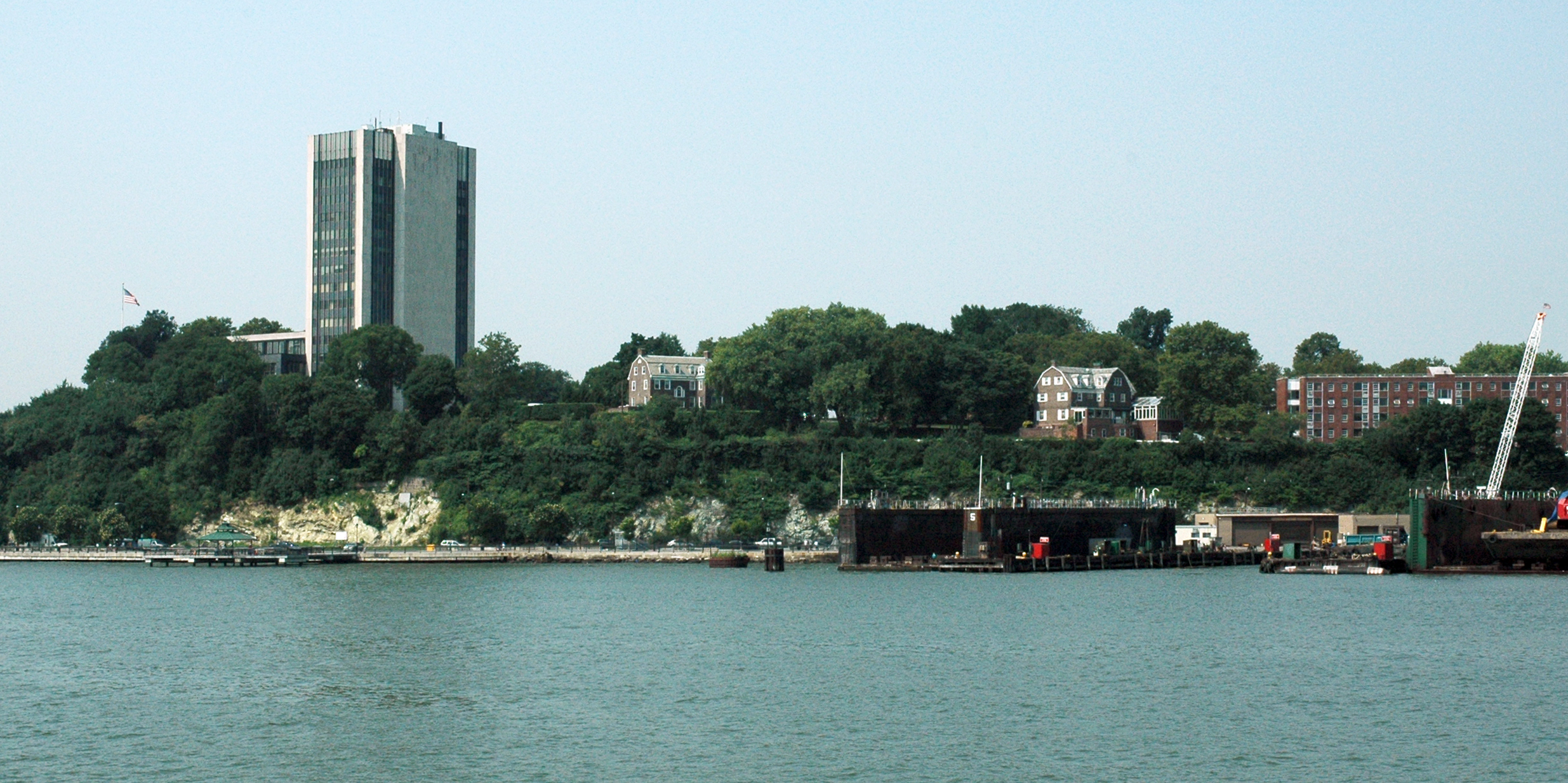
General view of the campus from the Hudson River in 2007

Stevens Tech's 55 acre (22 ha) campus is in Hoboken, New Jersey, a city defined by its proximity to New York City and high density. The campus overlooks the Hudson River and is primarily along the waterfront of Hoboken, directly west of Manhattan. The area has a humid subtropical climate and consists of a prominent hill known as Castle Point, the highest point in Hoboken. There are 17 academic, three athletic, 11 administrative, and nine non-Greek residential buildings. Thirteen Greek residences and additional buildings are associated with the university in Hoboken.

Of the 60+ buildings associated with the university, three are listed in the National Register of Historic Places (NRHP).

=== Early campus (1870–1916) ===
==== Edwin A. Stevens Hall ====
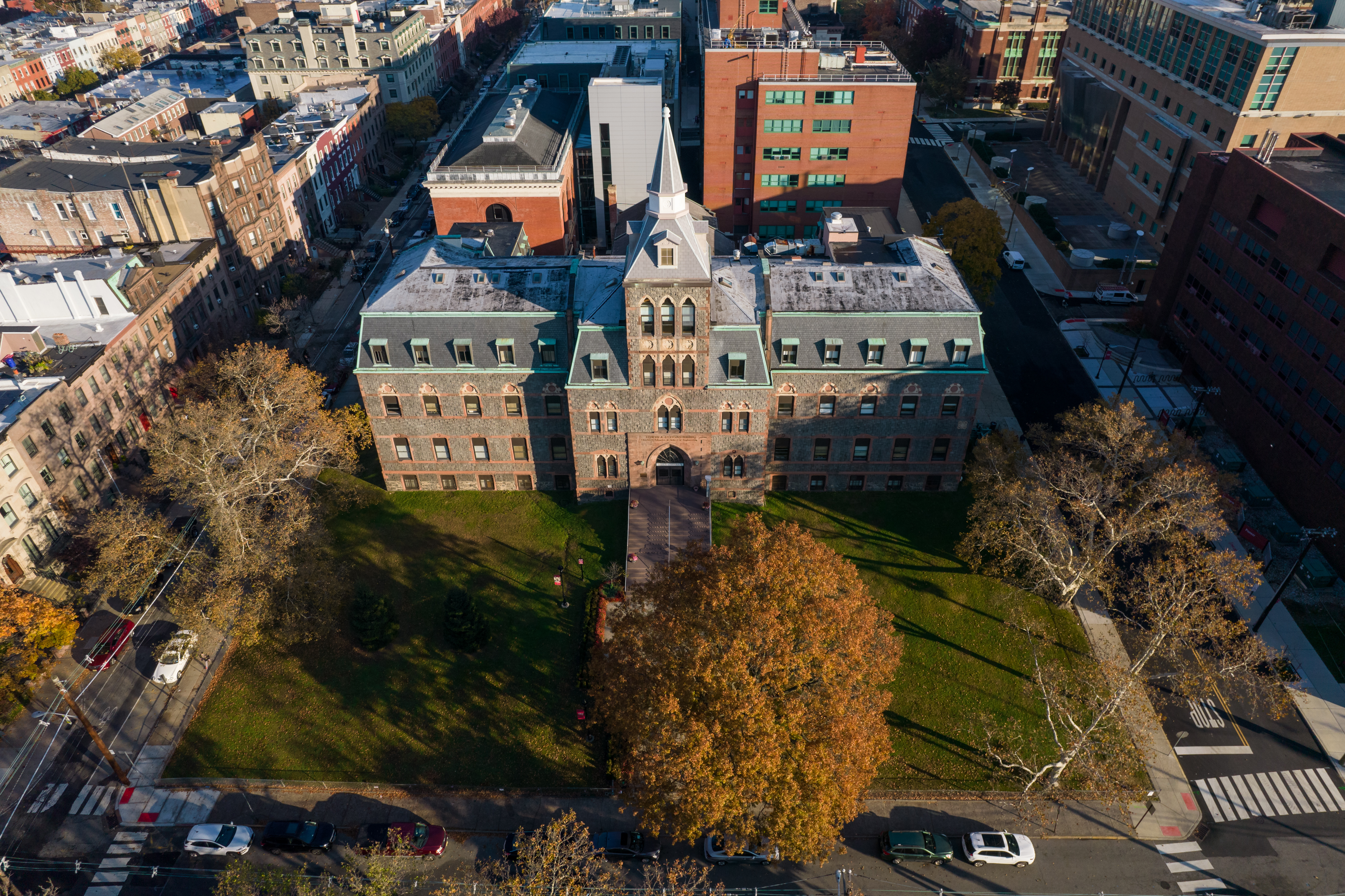
Edwin A. Stevens Hall in 2021, home to the Charles V. Schaefer Jr. School of Engineering and Science

When the institution opened in 1870 it consisted of a single building, Edwin A. Stevens Hall, named after its benefactor. The building was designed by renowned architect Richard Upjohn and featured a five-story, 80,000-square-foot hall in the High Victorian Gothic style adorned with heavy-stone masonry, brickwork, pointed arches, and intricately carved sculptures and ornaments. The majority of the building was finished in 1870, with the east wing being completed in 1872, and it functioned as the only building for the college until 1902. Notably, the American Society of Mechanical Engineers was chartered within the prominent main hall in 1880, now known as Debaun Auditorium. To celebrate the 125th anniversary of the institution a 40 ft spire was added atop the building, which is now featured as the logo of the university. Modernly, the building is home to the Charles V. Schaefer Jr. School of Engineering and Sciences, performing arts space, laboratories, offices, and lecture halls. The building was added to the NRHP in 1994 for its significance to education, architecture, and social history.

==== Carnegie Mechanical Laboratory ====
In 1900, trustee and benefactor Andrew Carnegie, offered a sum of $65,000 for the construction of a new engineering workshop, Carnegie Mechanical Laboratory. The architectural style of the building includes an arcade atop a cement basement with a Corinthian entablature. Structurally, a steel frame and cement make up the building, making it completely fireproof. The building is now home to labs, offices, and classroom space. Carnegie Laboratory is inter-linked with the Gateway Academic Center, which wraps around the north and east sides of the building.

==== Morton Memorial Laboratory of Chemistry ====
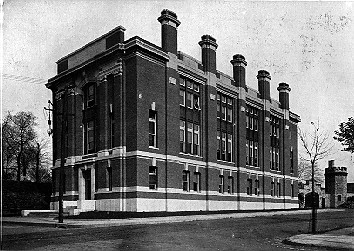
A side view of the Morton Memorial Laboratory of Chemistry

While Carnegie Laboratory was being constructed, President Henry Morton was developing plans for a suitable building to house a chemical laboratory, then known as the Alumni Chemical Hall. After Dr. Morton's death in 1902, the building was renamed to honor him and redesigned, as Jacobus said, to make it "look more imposing." Construction began in 1905. In 1906, the building was opened as the Morton Memorial Laboratory of Chemistry. The building was designed by Ackerman & Partridge and featured three-stories, ten prominent brick chimneys rising high above its roofline, with limestone and copper trimmings in a Classical Revival style. The building was added to the NRHP in 2022 for its significance to architecture.

==== William Hall Walker Gymnasium ====
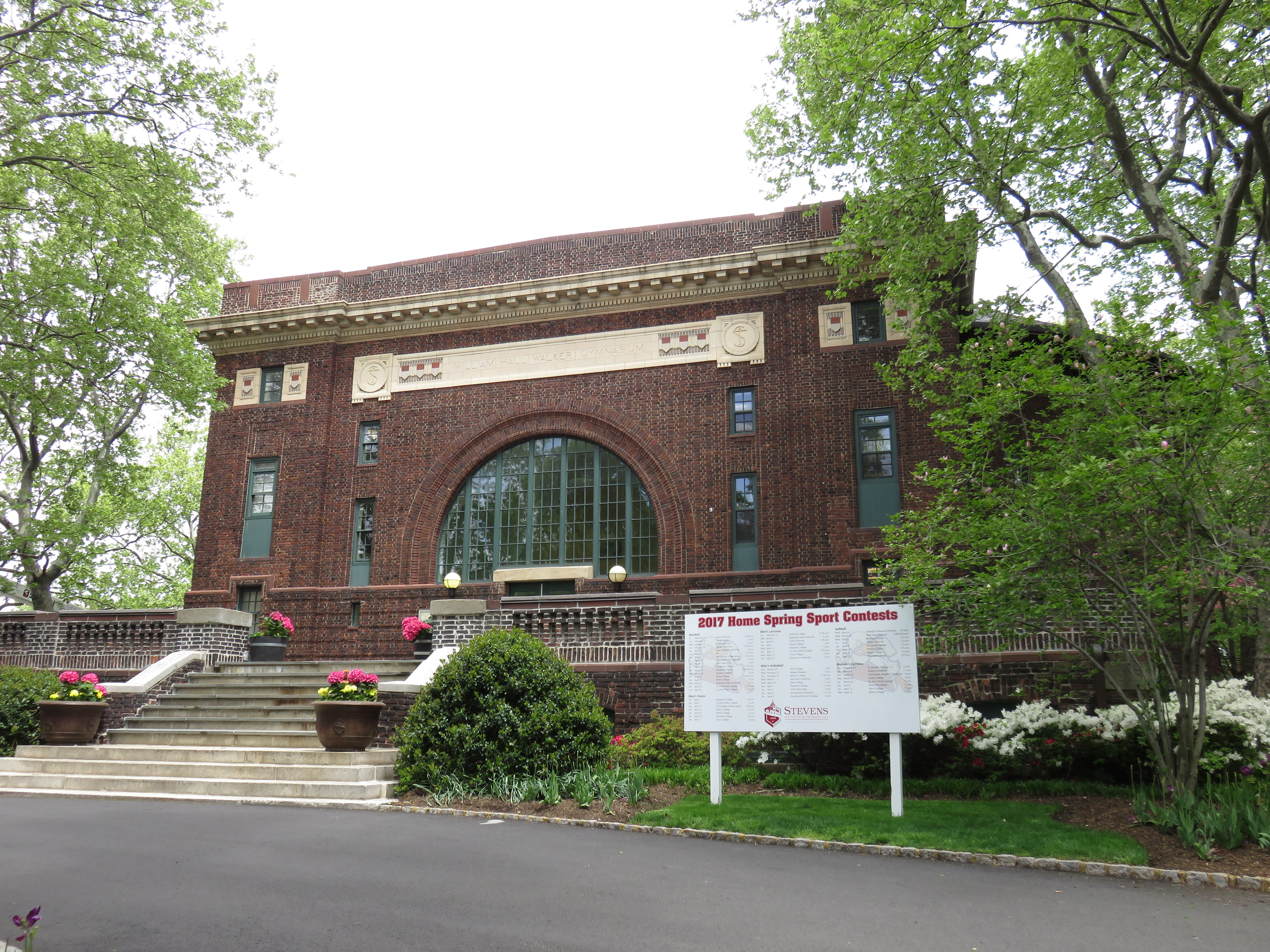
Walker Gymnasium in 2017

When William Hall Walker Gymnasium was completed in 1916 the student newspaper, The Stute, noted: "Stevens is now a real college, for we have a real place for college dances." The building was distinctive for its elliptical form (due to site conditions) and architects Ludlow & Peabody designed the structure in a classical revival style based on ancient Greek and Roman designs. The exterior of the building was made of variegated deep-toned brick with raked joints, lime and terracotta stone trim, and a green shingled tile roof. The second floor housed the main gymnasium under a trussed ceiling 27 feet above with a gallery running track. Modernly, the building's purpose is much the same, predominately as a space for athletics with occasional activities for student life. The building was added to the NRHP in 2019 for its significance to architecture.

=== Distinct buildings ===
In addition to the three buildings on the National Register of Historic Places, Stevens is also home to a few distinct features as part of its campus, whether at present or historically. This includes four sculptures, three historic plaques, an anchor, and the famous boat dorm.

==== S.S. Stevens (dorm boat) ====
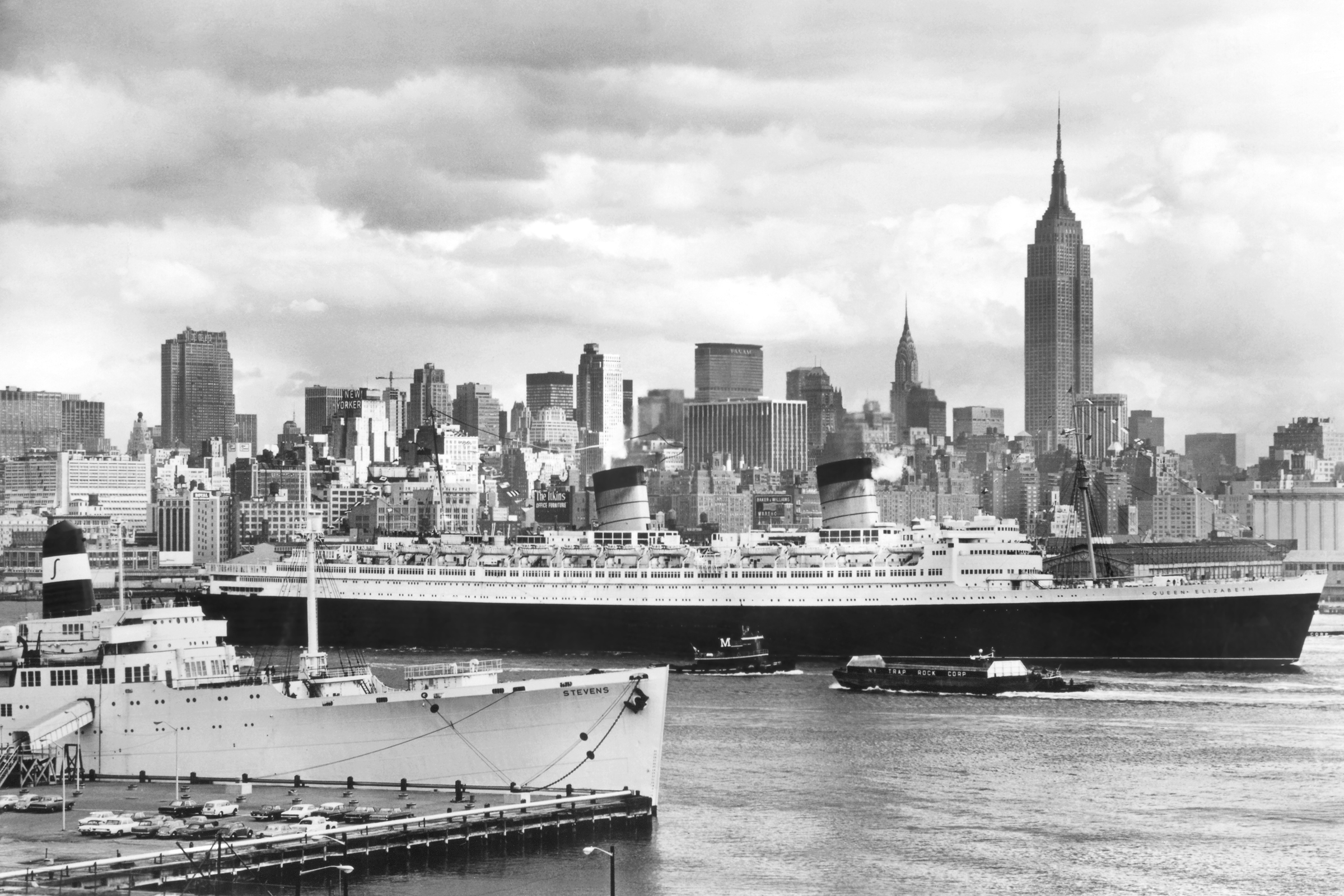
SS Stevens (lower left) docked on the Hudson River, across from New York City, being passed by RMS Queen Elizabeth in 1968. See Gallery for more photos.

The SS Stevens, a 473-foot, 14,893-ton ship, served as a floating dormitory from 1968 to 1975 for approximately 150 students. Moored on the Hudson River at the foot of campus across from New York City, this first collegiate floating dormitory became one of the best-known college landmarks in the country.

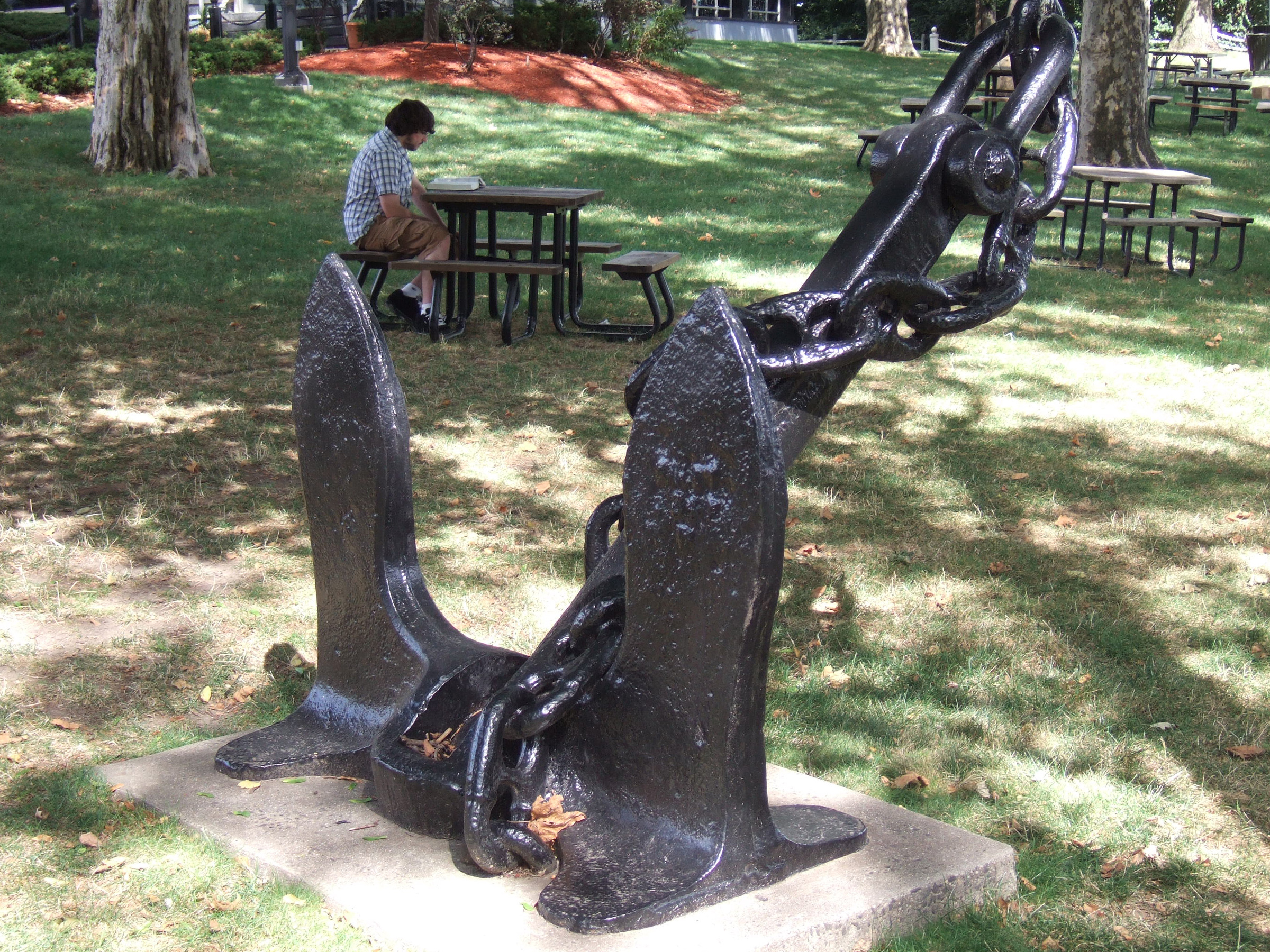
One of the SS Stevens 6-ton anchors on display

Purchased by the institute to fill a shortfall in student housing, the ship's operating costs during the initial years of service were comparable to conventional land-based dormitory housing. In later years, however, the ship's burgeoning operating and repair costs, combined with a more favorable housing outlook, forced the institute to sell Stevens in 1975. In tribute, one of her 6-ton anchors was prominently placed on the campus grounds by the graduating Class of 1975. In August 1975, the ship was towed to a shipyard in Chester, Pennsylvania, and she was subsequently scrapped in 1979. The anchor was briefly removed during the construction of the UCC Towers, but was brought back after student advocacy in April 2024.

==== S.C. Williams Library Archives ====
Stevens' S.C. Williams Library houses the university's special collections, which contain the largest compendium of items relating to Frederick Winslow Taylor; prints, manuscripts in facsimile and books by and about Leonardo da Vinci; and artwork by Alexander Calder, who studied at Stevens. The other collection hallmark, the "Leonardo da Vinci Room," was donated by John W. Lieb, Class of 1880.

The library's archives also house Stevens family documents and artifacts from early American and New Jersey history dating to the American Revolutionary War. The Hoboken Historical Museum hosted a six-month exhibition on the Stevens Family and their contributions to American life and featured many of the library's contents.

=== University Center Complex ===
University Center Complex

The University Center Complex (UCC), also known as the UCC Towers, is a residential and student life complex at Stevens Institute of Technology, completed in 2022. The complex consists of two residential towers, 19 and 21 stories tall, connected by a three-story university center at their base.

==== History and construction ====
The UCC project was announced in October 2018 as part of Stevens' strategic campus development plan. Construction began in 2019, with the complex opening to students in May 2022. The project cost approximately $256 million and represents the largest capital project in the institute's history.

The North Tower was named the Harries Tower in recognition of a major gift from Richard Harries (Class of 1958) and his wife Carol, which was the largest donation ever received by Stevens at the time.

The South Tower was named the Clark Tower in 2025 after a donation from the A. James & Alice B. Clark Foundation. The $21 million donation became the largest in Stevens history, serving to support the Clark Scholar's Program and start the Clark Scholars Philanthropy Challenge Endowed Fund.

==== Design and facilities ====
The complex was designed by Design Collective in collaboration with Wallace Roberts & Todd (WRT). The architectural design features extensive glass facades providing views of the Manhattan skyline and the Hudson River. At 290 feet (88 m) above sea level, the North Tower is the tallest structure on Stevens' campus.

The two residential towers house approximately 930 undergraduate students in suite-style accommodations. Each suite includes private bathrooms and kitchenettes. The towers are connected by a two-story skybridge featuring study lounges and social spaces.

The three-story university center at the base encompasses 80,000 square feet (7,400 m^{2}) and includes:

- A dining marketplace with multiple food stations
- A fitness center with panoramic city views
- High-tech conference rooms and meeting spaces
- Student Affairs and Student Life administrative offices
- A game room and recreational facilities
- A convenience store
- Lounge spaces and study areas

==== Sustainability ====
In November 2022, the UCC received Leadership in Energy and Environmental Design (LEED) Gold Certification from the U.S. Green Building Council. Sustainable features include energy-efficient lighting, advanced air filtration systems, water-saving fixtures, rainwater harvesting for irrigation, and green roofs for stormwater management.

== Organization and governance ==
=== Governance and administration ===
The 7th and current president of Stevens is Nariman Farvardin, who was appointed by the institute's board of trustees in 2011 following the resignation of Harold J. Raveché and chairman of the board Lawrence Babbio Jr. The board is currently chaired by Stephen T. Boswell, the former president and CEO of Boswell Engineering. The board is responsible for the overall direction of the university. It consists of no fewer than three and no more than 42 members at any one time, with the president of the university serving as an ex officio member. It approves the operating and capital budgets, supervises the investment of the university's endowment, and oversees campus real estate and long-range physical planning. The trustees also exercise prior review and approval concerning changes in major policies such as those in instructional programs and admission as well as tuition and fees and the hiring of faculty members.

The president also has a cabinet of 11 vice-presidents. The president and board are advised by a 21-member group known as the President's Leadership Council, including Marques Brownlee. The provost is advised by a 12-member Academic Council, including the deans for each of the schools and colleges.

Stevens is composed of four academic schools: the Charles V. Schaefer Jr. School of Engineering and Science, the School of Business, the School of Systems and Enterprises, and the School of Humanities, Arts and Social Sciences. The university is also home to the College of Online and Professional Education, established in 2023, which is focused on providing online education building on Stevens' 25-year WebCampus program. A fifth school, the Stevens School of Computing, was approved by the Board of Trustees in January 2026 and is scheduled to launch in fall 2026.

=== Academic affiliations ===
Stevens is a member of National Association of Independent Colleges and Universities and a founding-member of Association of Independent Technological Universities since 1957. The Middle States Commission on Higher Education (MSCHE) has served as the accrediting body for Stevens since 1927. For Engineering and Computer Science, ABET provides further accreditation. In 1937, Stevens and Columbia were the first two engineering programs accredited. Furthermore, the chemistry program at Stevens is approved by the American Chemical Society (ACS), undergraduate and graduate business programs are accredited by the Association to Advance Collegiate Schools of Business (AACSB), and project management programs are approved by the Project Management Institute (PMI).

=== Finances ===
Stevens reported an endowment of $387.7 million in fiscal year 2025, according to the National Association of College and University Business Officers. This represents growth from $319 million in 2023, which itself reflected an increase of $112 million over the prior five years, including $63 million in donations. A portion of the endowment, $475,000 as of 2020, is managed by the students in the Stevens Student Managed Investment Fund.

=== Student governance ===
Stevens Institute of Technology is home to a long tradition of student leadership. The Stevens Student Government Association (SGA) is an undergraduate governing body that retains complete control over the allocation of the funds raised by the student activity fee, which was about $800,000 per semester as of 2020. The SGA consists of a seven-person cabinet appointed by a president and vice-president of operations who are elected by the student body. The Senate of the SGA consists of senators per 75-undergraduates in each school.

The Honor Board is a student-run and student elected committee of the school, tasked with upholding the honor system and consulting on academic policies for the university. It is overseen by a faculty-student panel. The primary function of the board is to process academic conduct cases. The honor system was established in 1906 under the guidance of President Alexander Crombie Humphreys.

== Academics ==
=== Schools and colleges ===
Stevens is composed of four academic schools: the Charles V. Schaefer Jr. School of Engineering and Science, the School of Systems and Enterprises, the School of Business, and the School of Humanities, Arts and Social Sciences. The university also includes the College of Online and Professional Education, established in 2023, and in January 2026 announced a fifth school, the Stevens School of Computing, scheduled to launch in fall 2026. Stevens offers 35 undergraduate majors and has a 12:1 student-to-faculty ratio. Graduate offerings include 20 (plus three interdisciplinary) Ph.D. programs, 58 master's programs, 194 certificate programs and graduate-level offerings custom designed for corporations.

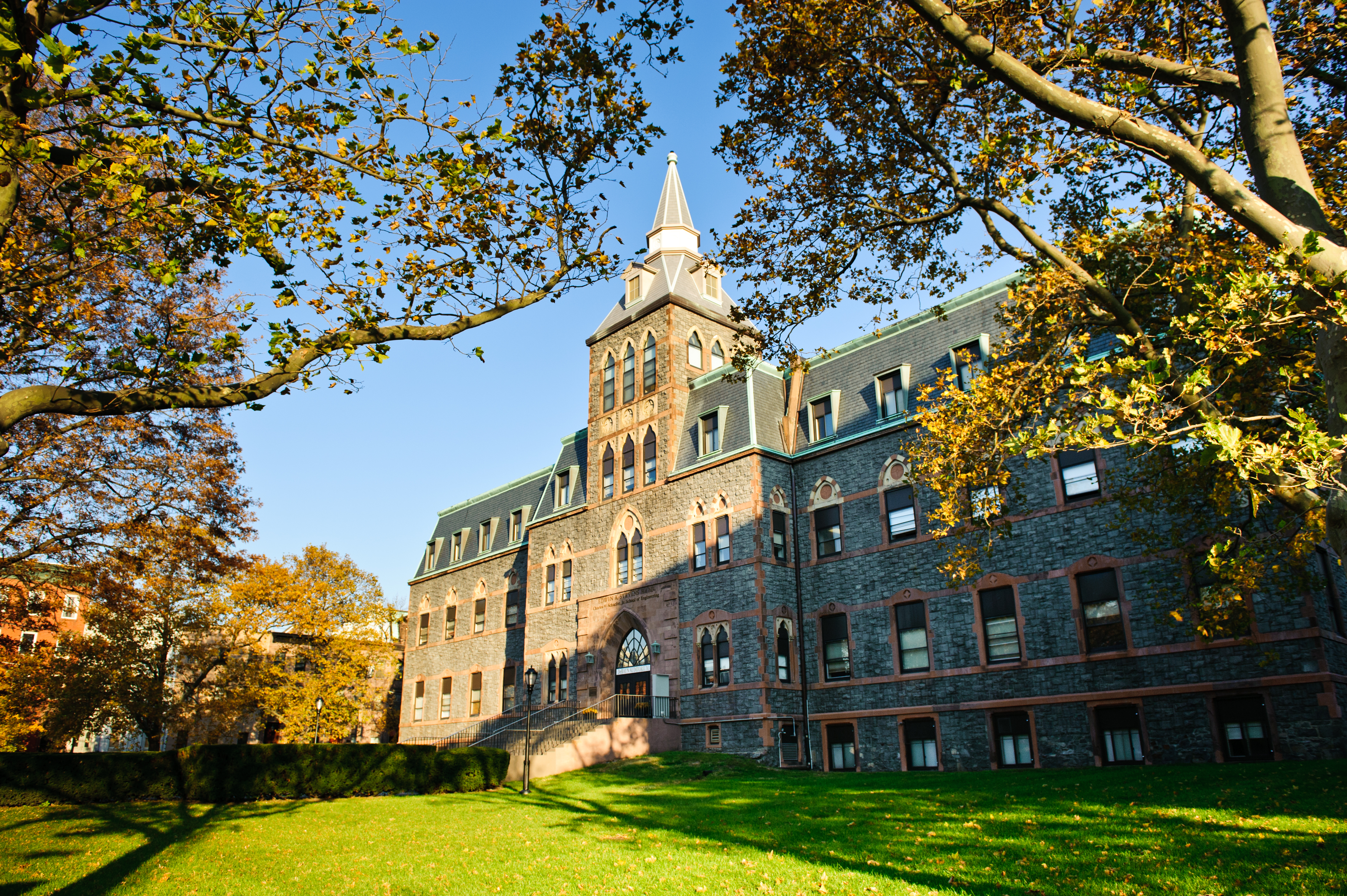
The historic Edwin A. Stevens Hall, home to the Charles V. Schaefer Jr. School of Engineering and Science

Stevens offers the Bachelor of Engineering (B.E.) degree and Bachelor of Science (B.S.) degree. At the graduate level, Stevens offers the Master of Engineering (M.Eng.), Master of Technology Management (M.T.M.), Master of Science (M.S.), Master of Business Administration (M.B.A.), Engineer (E.E., M.E., Comp. E., C.E. and Ch. E.), and Doctor of Philosophy (Ph.D.) degrees.

==== Charles V. Schaefer, Jr. School of Engineering and Sciences (SES) ====
In 1996, the school acquired its name from then chairman of the board of trustees, Charles V. Schaefer Jr., following a four-year $102 million fundraising campaign. Jean Zu is the current dean of the school. The Schaefer school offers 15 bachelor's, 29 master's and 16 doctoral degrees with a variety of certificates in engineering and scientific disciplines for full-time students and part-time professionals. As of 2022, the school is home to approximately 5,100 students and 194 faculty across 9 departments.

Stevens Institute of Technology had a dual degree program in engineering with New York University until NYU acquired the Polytechnic Institute of Brooklyn in 2008. Since then, the Schaefer school has also launched a number of dual-degree programs with institutions such as Drew University, Saint Peter's University, and Montclair State University. SES has joined nine NYC-area graduate engineering schools in the Inter-University Engineering Doctoral Consortium (IUEDC), which beginning in Fall 2024 will allow students to take courses at each other's institutions without any additional tuition.

The Lawrence T. Babbio Jr. Center for Technology Management, home of the School of Business and the School of Systems and Enterprises

==== School of Business (SSB) ====
The School of Business offers certificates and undergraduate, master's, M.B.A. and doctoral degrees in a variety of technology management specialties. Founded in 1997 as the Wesley J. Howe School of Technology Management and renamed in mid-2015 in conjunction with its accreditation by AACSB, the Stevens undergraduate program emphasizes mathematical business models, applications of hard science to the concept and marketing of products, financial engineering (stochastic calculus, probability and statistics as descriptors of the dynamic behavior of financial markets) and the case-study method of business analysis. The capstone project in the business curriculum is the design of a technology-based business, including an accompanying business plan, operations research, market analysis, financial prospectus, and risk analysis. Several projects have been developed into real companies. Gert-Jan "GJ" de Vreede has served as dean since September 2024, succeeding Gregory Prastacos. The school operates the Hanlon Financial Systems Center and is co-lead, with Rensselaer Polytechnic Institute, of the National Science Foundation–funded Center for Research toward Advancing Financial Technologies (CRAFT).

==== School of Humanities, Arts and Social Sciences (HASS) ====
The School of Humanities, Arts and Social Sciences (HASS) approaches the humanities, social sciences and the arts from a science and technology perspective. While every undergraduate at Stevens is required to take a set of humanities courses, the school offers B.A. degrees in literature, history, philosophy and the social sciences, as well as degrees in music and technology and visual arts and technology. Established as a separate college in 2007 under the name College of Arts and Letters (CAL), as part of a larger institutional realignment, the unit's formation followed a history of integrating humanities and liberal arts education that dates back to the university's founding in 1870. In fall 2011, CAL began offering a new M.A. and graduate certificate in Technology, Policy and Ethics. CAL also offers an accelerated, six-year combined bachelor's/J.D. degree program in partnership with New York Law School and Seton Hall University School of Law. In July 2023, Stevens renamed CAL to the School of Humanities, Arts and Social Sciences (HASS) as part of a broader university rebranding under the motto "Inspired by Humanity, Powered by Technology", elevating the unit to equal standing with the institute's other schools. The school is led by Dean Kelland Thomas, a saxophonist and computational creativity researcher who has been principal investigator on the DARPA-funded MUSICA project.

==== College of Online and Professional Education ====
The College of Online and Professional Education was announced in August 2023 and launched in April 2024 with the appointment of Arshad Saiyed as the inaugural Chief Online Learning Officer and Dean of Professional Education. Saiyed previously served as Associate Vice President for Digital Education and Innovation at Northeastern University, and earlier helped develop the iMBA program at the University of Illinois Urbana-Champaign's Gies College of Business. The college consolidates Stevens' previously distributed online programs, including those delivered under the WebCampus brand established in the late 1990s and those operated through partnerships with the online education company Noodle, and reports directly to the provost.

==== School of Computing ====
In January 2026, the Stevens Board of Trustees approved the establishment of the Stevens School of Computing, supported by an initial $36 million in philanthropic gifts and intended to serve as the university's hub for computing and artificial intelligence education and research. The school is scheduled to launch in fall 2026 and is expected to absorb the institute's existing computer science programs, which together account for more than a quarter of total student enrolment. A national search for the inaugural dean was opened in early 2026 with the executive search firm Isaacson, Miller, with concurrent faculty recruitment in AI, machine learning, cybersecurity, and data science.

=== Cooperative education and career placement ===
Undergraduate students may elect to follow the cooperative education program, usually extending their timeline from four to five years, to gain about 18 months of increasingly progressive work experience. The program helps students confirm their choice of major, and clarify their interests and career goals while working in full-time, paid positions. Approximately 30% of undergraduate students follow this path while the remaining engage in research, externships or internships.

The combination of rigorous coursework and real-world application allows 73% of students to finalize their path prior to graduation, with 97% securing their intended outcomes within six months after graduation. The average accepted salary across all majors for the Class of 2021 was $75,400, with a maximum of $90,600, from over 300 companies recruiting on campus. Majors among those ranking the highest were computer science, computer engineering and software engineering. The value of a Stevens degree is often quantified through return on investment, in which the university ranks among the top in the United States.

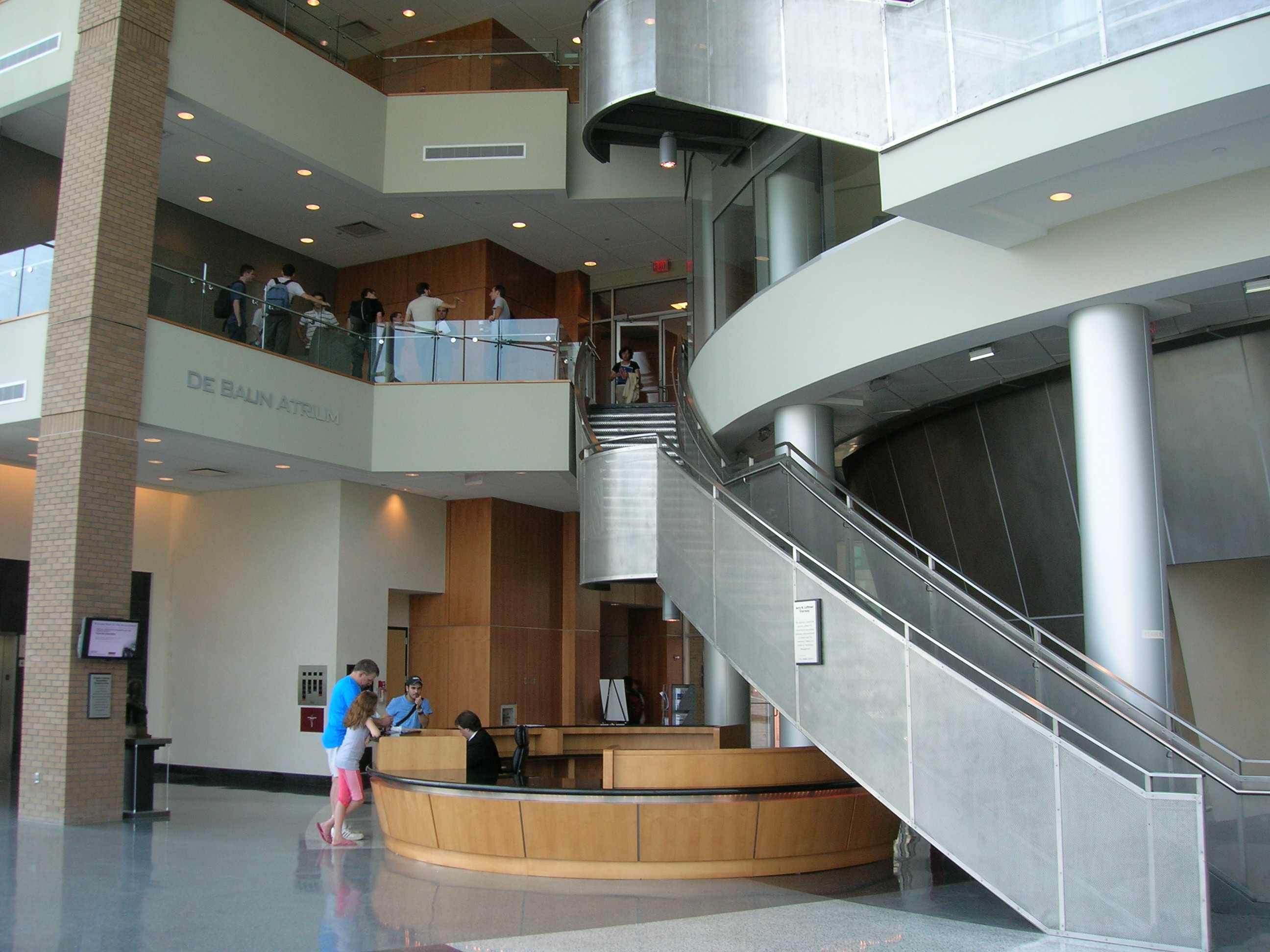
Inside the Babbio Center at Stevens Institute of Technology

=== Research ===
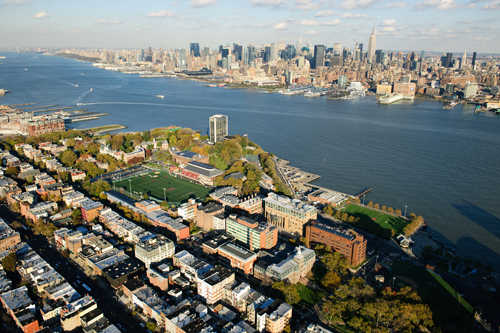
The Stevens Institute of Technology campus, facing the Hudson River and Manhattan's skyscrapers

The research enterprise at Stevens features three national Centers of Excellence designated by the U.S. government: the National Center for Secure and Resilient (CSR) Maritime Commerce and the National Systems Engineering Research Center (SERC). The Acquisition Innovation Research Center (AIRC) is also part of the Systems Engineering Research Center.

Stevens also features the Center for the Advancement of Secure Systems and Information Assurance (CASSIA), dedicated to advancements in cybersecurity. The center was developed in response to Stevens' designations by the Department of Homeland Security and the National Security Agency as a National Center of Academic Excellence in Information Assurance Education for the academic years 2003 through 2014, and as a National Center of Academic Excellence in Information Assurance Research for the years 2008 through 2013.

The Center for Maritime Systems at Stevens works to preserve and secure America's maritime resources and assets. The center includes the Davidson Laboratory, a research facility focused on physical modeling and computer simulation of marine craft designs. The lab houses a 313-foot-long wave tank capable of recreating a variety of wave types for maritime testing. Work at the lab was dedicated to the war effort during World War II. The facility is one of only two designated International Historic Mechanical Engineering Landmarks in the United States.

The Center for Maritime Systems contributed to the US Airways Flight 1549 Miracle on the Hudson recovery in 2009 by analyzing water currents to identify the best location to tow the plane and locate the plane's missing engine.

The Center for Innovation in Engineering and Science Education (CIESE), part of the Schaefer School, provides expertise to improve K–12 science, mathematics, engineering and technology education, with the goal to increase the number of students pursuing STEM majors and careers in technological fields. CIESE received the Presidential Award for Science, Mathematics, and Engineering Mentoring in 2011.

The Center for Environmental Systems (CES) develops environmental technologies through collaboration between faculty in the Department of Civil, Environmental and Ocean Engineering, the Department of Defense, and private enterprise. Principal research areas for CES include drinking water technologies, wastewater treatment, air pollution control, environmental systems modeling and monitoring, pollution prevention and minimization, and life-cycle assessment.

The Highly Filled Materials Institute (HfMI) develops the theoretical, experimental, and numerical analysis techniques for providing solutions for the problems of the industrial processing, especially with twin-screw extrusion, of highly filled materials. HfMI research areas include extrusion, die and extruder design, crystallization, surface science, particle size analysis and rheology.

The Center for Research toward Advancing Financial Technologies (CRAFT), co-led by Stevens and Rensselaer Polytechnic Institute, is the first NSF-backed industry-university cooperative research center devoted specifically to financial technology and science. CRAFT is designed to create a community for industry to engage with university researchers to advance fintech innovation.

Other research centers at Stevens are the Center for Complex Systems and Enterprises (CCSE), Center for Decision Technologies, Center for Quantum Science and Engineering, Center for Environmental Systems, MicroDevice Lab, Center for Healthcare Innovation, Center for Neuromechanics, Hanlon Financial Systems Center, Maritime Security Center, NJ Center for Microchemical Systems, STAR Center, Stevens Institute for Artificial Intelligence, and Systems Engineering Research Center.

The U.S. Department of Energy invited Stevens to compete in the 2015 Solar Decathlon held at Orange County Great Park in Irvine, California, among 19 other universities. Stevens' entry, SURE HOUSE, was inspired by Hurricane Sandy. A net-zero home resilient enough to withstand Hurricane-force winds and flooding, the entry won the competition. SURE HOUSE achieved a total score of 950.685, ranking first in architecture, market appeal, communications, appliances, engineering, commuting and home life. It also received second place in the comfort zone contest.

Stevens also competed as one of 20 teams in the 2013 Solar Decathlon, the first time the competition was held outside of Washington, D.C. Stevens' independent entry, "Ecohabit," placed fourth overall and second among United States entries.

Through a partnership with Parsons The New School for Design and Milano School of International Affairs, Management and Urban Policy, Stevens designed an affordable green home as part of the 2011 Solar Decathlon. The entry, "Empowerhouse," won first place in affordability during the 2011 competition. The team partnered with Habitat for Humanity of Washington, D.C., to provide the home to a low-income family in the Deanwood section of Washington at the conclusion of the competition.

=== Entrepreneurship ===
Stevens embraces a culture of entrepreneurship instilled in the institute from its founding family, who transformed their inventions into a number of successful enterprises like the first steam-driven locomotive. More recently, there have been significant sales of Stevens intellectual property, including PlasmaSol and Hydroglobe. The university's Office of Innovation and Entrepreneurship was established in 2008 to enhance scientific discoveries by facilitating technology transfer.

ISTEM@Stevens is a four-year entrepreneurship coaching program for incoming first-year students. The program focuses not only on technology and innovation, but also the process required to transform the idea into a fully developed company or nonprofit. The curriculum includes both classes and independent studies.

Launchpad@Stevens is a one-year program that gives undergraduate students the chance to learn about entrepreneurship and innovation alongside professionals who are building technology-based businesses. Participants learn how to identify ideas with potential commercial viability and work in teams to build those ideas into viable businesses.

Stevens' Innovation Expo, also referred to as "Senior Design Day" or simply "D-Day" by students, is an annual event at the end of the spring semester to feature capstone projects from undergraduate seniors of all schools and majors. Capstone projects take place over two semesters. The day of activities is also marked by the Project Plan Pitch and Elevator Pitch Competition in which students are judged on presentation of their idea and feasibility; many competitors spin-out companies and business ventures from their projects. The panel of judges typically consists of entrepreneurs, CEOs and venture capitalists.

Additionally, the institute hosts the "Thomas H. Scholl Lecture by Visiting Entrepreneurs." Guest lecturers include Paul R. Sanberg, Jeong H. Kim, Winslow Sargeant, and Ann Fandozzi. The campus is also home to monthly summits of NJ Tech Meetup, branded as "NJ's largest technology and entrepreneurial community." It is composed of over 150 entrepreneurs and innovators.

For the 2024–2025 academic year, the middle 50% of enrolled students scored between 1380 and 1505 on the SAT (with a 50th percentile of 1440), with a 50th percentile of 700 on the SAT Evidence-Based Reading and Writing section, and between 710 and 770 on the SAT Math section (50th percentile: 740).

== Rankings ==
Academic rankings

National
- Forbes: 215
- U.S. News & World Report: 76
- Washington Monthly: 197
- WSJ/College Pulse: 36

Global
- QS: 673
- THE: 401–500
- U.S. News & World Report: 1225

- Stevens was ranked 18th nationally for Return on Investment for Students by PayScale's 2024 rankings.
- Stevens was ranked 12th nationally for Best Career Placement (Private Schools) by The Princeton Review in 2024.
- Stevens was ranked 4th in the U.S. for Best Value Private Colleges by PayScale in 2021.
- Stevens was ranked 36th nationally according to the Wall Street Journal in 2024.
- Stevens was ranked 76th in national universities according to the U.S. News 2024 edition.

== Greek organizations ==
Stevens Institute of Technology hosts chapters of 21 social and academic fraternities and sororities, many of which were founded on campus over a century ago. In 2014, 22% of Stevens students were members of these organizations. All Stevens' Greek organizations are chapters of national fraternities or sororities.

== Athletics ==
Stevens Tech athletics mark

The Stevens Ducks are composed of 23 NCAA Division III teams representing Stevens Institute of Technology in intercollegiate competition. The Ducks are members of the Middle Atlantic Conferences (MAC) and the MAC Freedom Conference for all sports except fencing.

Men's fencing competes in the Mid-Atlantic Collegiate Fencing Association (MACFA) and women's fencing competes in both the Eastern Women's Fencing Conference (EWFC) and the National Intercollegiate Women's Fencing Association (NIWFA).

== Notable faculty ==
- Carlos Alomar, professional guitarist, longtime collaborator with David Bowie, artist in residence and director of the Sound Synthesis Research Center at Stevens
- Chang-Hwan Choi, engineer and professor
- John Horgan, science journalist at Scientific American, author of the controversial book The End of Science (1996), director of the Center for Science Writings at Stevens
- Jon Jaques, professional basketball player, assistant basketball coach (Cornell University)
- Dilhan M. Kalyon, rheologist, Institute Professor, director of the Highly Filled Materials Institute
- Wunibald Kamm, professor
- Samantha Kleinberg, computer science professor and current Farber Chair
- Victor B. Lawrence, inducted into the National Inventors Hall of Fame for his many contributions in digital signal processing in communications, recipient of the National Medal of Technology and Innovation
- Deborah Sinnreich-Levi, professor of literature, specialist on Eustache Deschamps
- Alex Wellerstein, historian of science, specialist on history of nuclear weapons
- Jean Zu, mechanical engineer, dean of the Charles Schaefer School of Engineering & Science

== Notable alumni ==
Two members of the Stevens community, as alumni or faculty, have been awarded the Nobel Prize: Frederick Reines (class of 1939), in physics, and Irving Langmuir (Chemistry faculty 1906–1909), in chemistry. For people who did not know how to organize their time, Henry Gantt developed the well known Gantt charts.

== See also ==
- List of presidents of Stevens Institute of Technology
- Association of Independent Technological Universities
- Stevens SU-1, a glider design developed as a student project at the Stevens Institute in 1933
- Stevens Institute of Technology International, a defunct private university in the Dominican Republic
