= Charles Ward Engineering Works =

US iron and steel fabricator and shipyard

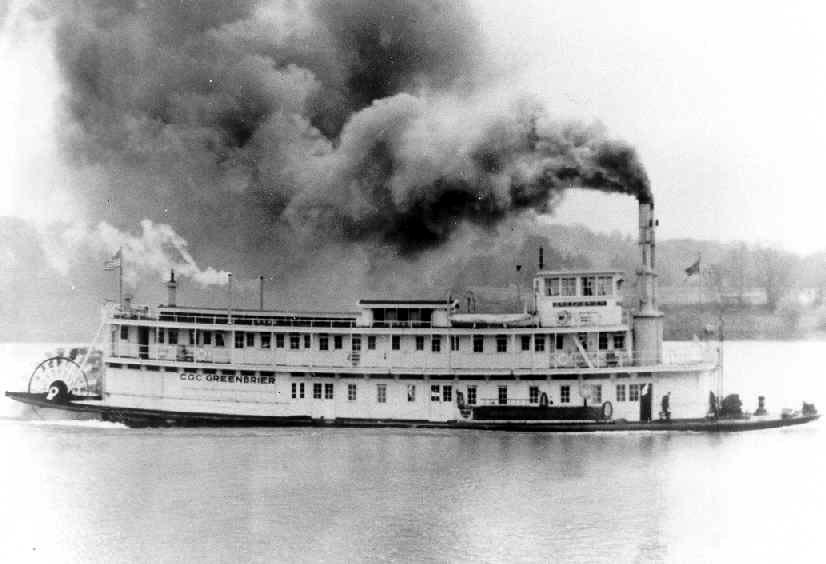
USCGC Greenbriar, a paddle wheel steamer built by Charles Ward Engineering Works in 1924

The Charles Ward Engineering Works, Charleston, W. Va. was an iron and steel fabricator and shipyard founded by Charles Ward in 1872. They produced shallow draught boats at a plant on the south bank of the Kanawha River. It remained in operation until 1931 headed by the founder’s son Charles E. Ward.

Ward designed and built many steam and diesel powered vessels, both paddlewheel and propeller driven. Customers include the Army, Navy and Coast Guard.

Ward manufactured water-tube boilers in many sizes. The firm also pioneered the development of the tunnel stern propeller driven towboats and were among the first companies to install diesel power in river towboats.

== Notable vessels built by Charles Ward Engineering Works ==
- P.A. Denny stern wheel towboat 1930
- USAT General Frank M. Coxe US Army harbor ferry 1922
- USAT General John McE. Hyde US Army harbor ferry 1921
- USCGC Greenbrier Coast Guard river tender 1924

== See also ==
- Riverboat
- Towboat
