= USCGC Greenbrier =

Vessel ship name

Two vessels of the United States Coast Guard have borne the name USCGC Greenbrier:

- USCGC Greenbrier (WAGL-214) was a stern paddlewheel steamer used as a river tender. She was built in 1924, and used first by the United States Lighthouse Service, transferring to the Coast Guard in 1939. She was decommissioned in 1946 and sold in 1947.
- USCGC Greenbrier (WLR-75501) is a Kankakee-class river buoy tender, launched in 1990 and currently in service.
