= George A. Palmer =

American Protestant minister and broadcaster (1895–1981)

- Born: February 14, 1895; Philadelphia, Pennsylvania, US
- Died: January 11, 1981 (aged 85)
- Education: Philadelphia School of the Bible
- Known for: Morning Cheer radio broadcast (1931–1981); Sandy Cove Conference Center (1946–present)
- Spouse: Rachel Anna (Stow) Palmer (m. June 27, 1919)
- Ordained: June 1929
- Writings: Medicine, the magnet
- Congregations served: Asbury Methodist Church, Cinnaminson, New Jersey (1917–1919); Union Methodist Church, Burlington, New Jersey (1919–1923); Maranatha Tabernacle, Darby, Pennsylvania (1924–1932); Haddon Heights Baptist Church, New Jersey (1932–1940)

George Augustus Palmer (February 14, 1895 – January 11, 1981) was an American Protestant clergyman from Philadelphia, Pennsylvania, who started the long-running Morning Cheer radio broadcast in 1931, which eventually had an international outreach. He founded the "Sandy Cove" Christian camp and conference center on the shores of the Chesapeake Bay in nearby North East, Maryland, in 1946. Palmer was head of Morning Cheer Inc., the non-profit owner of the campgrounds, with its corporate offices in Philadelphia. Under his leadership, the Morning Cheer organization supported the development of a hospital in Quito, Ecuador, in the 1950s and an orphanage for boys in India beginning in 1958.

== Early years ==
George Palmer was born in Philadelphia, Pennsylvania, on February 14, 1895, the son of Maude and Gilbert Palmer. His father, a railroad fireman, died in a train accident when George was only two years old, leaving the family with limited financial resources. When he was six, his mother enrolled him at Girard College, a tuition-free boarding school in Philadelphia for orphaned or fatherless boys. Palmer left Girard College when he was sixteen and found work as a plasterer to help support his family.

When Palmer was twenty years old, he answered an altar call at a Methodist church in Masonville, New Jersey, where his family had moved, and became a born again Christian. He then followed in his father's footsteps by working for the Reading Railroad, while attending night school at Philadelphia School of the Bible, studying under C. I. Scofield and William L. Pettingill. By 1917, Palmer was a licensed Methodist local preacher and he began serving at Asbury Methodist Church in Cinnaminson Township, New Jersey. Palmer married Rachel Anna Stow, whose family attended Asbury Methodist Church, on June 27, 1919. He next pastored Union Methodist Church in Burlington, New Jersey, between 1919 and 1923, before resigning from the Methodist denomination. The following year, he began speaking at the independent Maranatha Tabernacle in Darby, Pennsylvania, where he continued until 1932. Palmer was ordained as a Baptist minister in June 1929.

== As an ordained minister ==
=== Haddon Heights Baptist Church ===
Palmer was pastor of Haddon Heights Baptist Church in Haddon Heights, New Jersey, beginning in 1932, where he injected an evangelistic zeal by having summer tent meetings. He continued to hold summer-long tent meetings throughout the 1930s, while pastoring there. Missionaries and guest speakers, such as M. R. DeHaan in 1939, took part in the meetings. Palmer was the church's pastor until July 1, 1940, when he resigned to devote himself to his evangelistic radio broadcasts.

=== Morning Cheer broadcast ===
Palmer began the daily Morning Cheer radio broadcast in 1931 on WRAX in Philadelphia, airing between 7 and 8 am. The program originated from his family's Haddon Heights parsonage home via a loop to the WRAX studios. The live broadcast's informal tone appealed to listeners, with Palmer's wife and young pre-school children singing and the family dog sometimes heard barking in the background. He even kept four singing canaries near the microphone to add to the program's cheerful outlook. The early-morning program typically included an uplifting meditation by Palmer and scripture readings to encourage the listening audience amidst the Great Depression. The program's theme song was the gospel hymn, "Jesus Never Fails". By the mid-1930s, Morning Cheer was also carried on WMCA in New York City and Palmer added a midday program on WIP. As Palmer's popularity grew, he frequently spoke to large crowds numbering in the thousands at the large 4,000-seat Baptist Temple in Philadelphia and Calvary Baptist Church in New York City.

On October 10, 1935, a smoldering fire in the basement of Palmer's house created billowing smoke while his morning radio program was underway. He announced on the air, "My house is on fire ... filling up with smoke!". Undeterred, Palmer continued with the live broadcast, reporting to his rapt radio audience the arrival of fire engines as sirens were heard in the background and then describing the firemen's activities as they moved about the house, assuring listeners that the four canaries and his family were safely evacuated to the front lawn. Headlined the next day by the New York Herald Tribune, "Fire in House, Radio Minister Keeps Talking", the story was picked up by the wire services and retold, greatly exaggerated to make it sound as though Palmer bravely remained at his post preaching the Gospel while flames were practically licking at his feet.

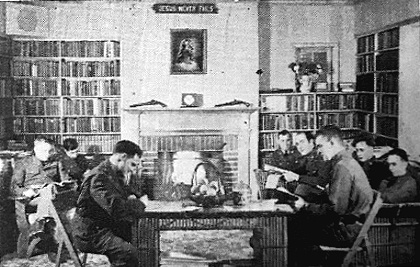
Soldiers from nearby Fort Dix in the "Morning Cheer Victory Center" library

By October 1940, Morning Cheer was on WIBG, then a religious-format radio station serving the Philadelphia area. During World War II, Morning Cheer operated the "Morning Cheer Victory Center" ministry and canteen at Wrightstown, New Jersey, serving the soldiers training at nearby Fort Dix prior to their going overseas. Palmer published a book in 1943, Miracles at Morning Cheer, recounting the experiences of soldiers visiting the Victory Center and others affected by the Morning Cheer ministry.

In the 1950s, the program was carried on WJMJ and WVCH in the Philadelphia area. The "Morning Cheer Men's Trio" was a popular feature, making frequent appearances at area churches and Youth for Christ rallies by the 1950s. The Trio later became a quartet. By then, Morning Cheer was a regional radio broadcast, also carried on WDAC-FM in Lancaster, Pennsylvania, and the old WCBC-FM in Baltimore, Maryland. Palmer started a Sunday afternoon television version of his popular show on March 25, 1956, over WPFH channel 12 in Wilmington, Delaware.

=== International endeavors ===
In the late 1940s, Palmer's Morning Cheer program began highlighting the needs of missionaries in South America and India. Funding from listeners' contributions beginning in 1948 were used to start a missionary medical clinic in Quito, Ecuador, to serve indigenous people. With the ongoing support of Morning Cheer, the clinic was expanded into a full-fledged hospital in the following years. Initially named the Rimmer Memorial Hospital, it is now called the Hospital Vozandes (Spanish for "Voice of the Andes", the slogan of Quito-based international shortwave radio station HCJB. Palmer participated in the dedication of the hospital upon completion of construction in 1955 and co-authored the book, Medicine, the magnet, about the medical missionary work of Paul Roberts there.

In 1958, Morning Cheer assumed financial responsibility for the operation of the Boys Christian Home in Dhond, India, for orphaned boys. The support has continued under succeeding generations of Palmers. In the 1970s, Morning Cheer also supported a Christian seminary in Tokyo, Japan.

== Sandy Cove conference center and campgrounds ==
Palmer founded the "Sandy Cove" Christian conference center and camp on the shores of the Chesapeake Bay in North East, Maryland, in 1946. His Morning Cheer non-profit organization was formed to own and operate the 450-acre (180 ha) property, along with corporate offices and a bookstore on Walnut Street in Philadelphia. The Conference Center's nondenominational program of guest speakers and musicians continues to operate year-round. Notable speakers in past years have included Cal Thomas, Tony Campolo, Ravi Zacharias, Donald Barnhouse, William Culbertson III, J. Vernon McGee, and John F. MacArthur. Celebrated baritone soloist George Beverly Shea sang at Sandy Cove in July, 1948, and Maryland Governor Theodore R. McKeldin preached at Sandy Cove on September 1, 1953. A 152-room hotel, the "Chesapeake Lodge & Conference Center", was built on the property and opened in May 1987. As many as 3,000 people have attended the weekly Saturday night concerts.

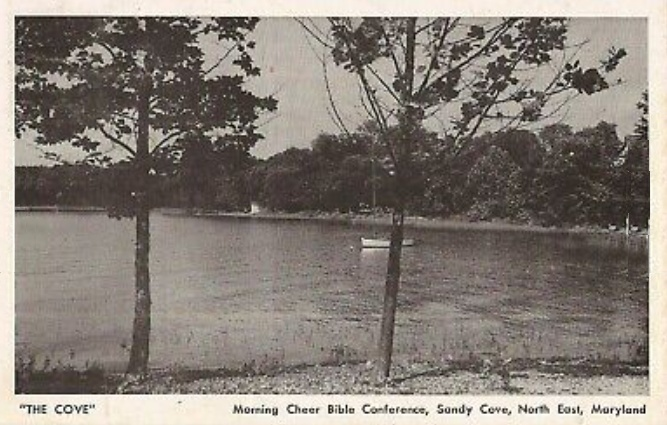
Sandy Cove postcard (1949)

In 1949, Morning Cheer became embroiled in a dispute with Cecil County, Maryland, over property taxes levied on its Sandy Cove property. Contending it was exempt as a non-profit religious entity, Morning Cheer appealed to the Maryland Court of Appeals in January 1950. The state claimed that the property was "designed for the sole physical and financial welfare" of Palmer and, therefore, taxable. In its defense, Morning Cheer's attorneys argued that its purpose was "the spread of the knowledge of the saving grace of the Lord" and Palmer said, "We have ministered to the poor and we have carried the Gospel to the ends of the earth". On February 9, 1950, the Court ruled in Palmer's favor in Morning Cheer, Inc. v. Board of County Commissioners of Cecil County, finding that Morning Cheer was indeed non-profit with Palmer getting a salary only, and that the property qualified for exemption because its sole use was for worship.

Summer resident camps for boys and girls ages 7–14 were operated on the property between 1951 and 2018. The camps offered swimming, sailing on the Chesapeake Bay, horseback riding, and other recreational activities, along with inspirational speakers and Christian counselors. The popular camps had hundreds of children attending each week and were nondenominational, open to all races and inclusive of disabled children in wheelchairs. It was, Palmer's grandson George III recalled in 2016, "based on the idea that 'God sees the soul' – not a person's ability or lack thereof". A camp for teenagers and college age young people ages 15–25 was started in 1956 at Rising Sun, Maryland, called "Camp Hilltop". It offered sports, recreation, and music, along with Bible studies and discussions of interest to teens and young adults. As of 2021, a children's day camp, "The Marsh", continues to be operated during the summer.

Due to the COVID-19 pandemic, the Sandy Cove Conference Center and campgrounds sustained a reduction of 10,000 attendees resulting in $2 million less revenue in the spring of 2020 while temporarily closed, compared to a normal year. In a year-end report for 2020 to supporters of Sandy Cove Ministries, President and CEO 2019 Stephen J. Weaver said that total annual revenues were $7.4 million in 2019, the last full year of normal operations before the pandemic curtailed activities.

== Personal life and legacy ==
Palmer was married to Rachel Anna (Stow) Palmer (1901–1982). They had seven children, three of whom predeceased the couple: two died in infancy within a year of each other and their firstborn son, George Jr., died in 1946 from injuries suffered while serving aboard the U.S. Coast Guard vessel Greenbrier during World War II. Their son Robert succeeded his father in 1972 as president of Sandy Cove Ministries, serving until 1990. He died in August 2012. Other descendants continue to be active with Sandy Cove ministries. As of 2022, Palmer's grandson, Paul Jr., is chairman of the board. Palmer's descendants continue to operate and take mission trips to the Boys and Girls Christian Home in India. In an interview, one noted that girls are now admitted to the Home, to meet a critical need for more such facilities for poor girls in India.

Palmer had a Doctor of Divinity degree and was inducted into the National Religious Broadcasters Hall of Fame in 1976. When he died at age 85 on January 11, 1981, the Morning Cheer broadcasts ended. Palmer is buried in the cemetery of Asbury United Methodist Church in Cinnaminson, New Jersey, where he first preached between 1917 and 1919.
