= USAT General Frank M. Coxe =

American army transport ship

Coordinates: 37°35′30″N 122°20′18″W

History

United States
- Name: General Frank M. Coxe
- Builder: Charles Ward Engineering Works, Charleston, West Virginia
- Laid down: 16 July 1921
- Launched: 3 March 1922
- Acquired: delivered 1 December 1922
- Decommissioned: 1947
- Fate: Sold and became a harbor tour boat and finally a floating restaurant, scrapped 2020

General characteristics
- Type: Troop ferry
- Tonnage: 539 register tons (1,526 m^{3}) gross; 366 register tons (1,036 m^{3}) net
- Displacement: 900 long tons (914 t)
- Length: 144 ft (44 m) (LBP)
- Beam: 28 ft (8.5 m)
- Depth: 9 ft (2.7 m)
- Propulsion: 2 Ward water tube boilers

General Frank M. Coxe was a steam ferry which was built for the United States Army to provide transportation services among several military facilities that ring California's San Francisco Bay. The Army port facilities, including the vessels, throughout the bay were under the command of the San Francisco Port of Embarkation from its establishment in May 1932 through World War II and the Korean War.

The 144-foot (44 m) ship's keel was laid on July 16, 1921, launched March 3, 1922, and delivered December 1, 1922, to the War Department by Charles Ward Engineering Works. General Frank M. Coxe and sister-ship USAT General John McE. Hyde were designed and built shortly after World War I to ferry army personnel to island bases in strategic harbors, in answer to the increasing military importance of the Pacific ports.

Prior to the availability of the current system of bridges and highways in San Francisco Bay, mobility on the water was critical. It is estimated that the General Frank M. Coxe carried six million passengers during her military service.

== Design and construction ==
General Frank M. Coxe was not a United States Navy ship; it was among the thousands of vessels owned and operated by the US Army for specific logistical purposes. It was designed by the New York firm of Cox & Stevens, who were renowned Naval Architects specializing in yachts and small commercial and military craft. General Frank M. Coxe was built in 1922, along with the General John McE. Hyde (built 1921), to Cox & Stevens' design #244 by Charles Ward Engineering Works of Charleston, West Virginia, located on the Kanawha River, a firm which specialized in shallow draft vessels such as ferries, riverboats, and tugs. (The General John McE. Hyde was sunk by Japanese artillery at Corregidor on April 15, 1942, during World War II.)

== History ==
=== Military use ===
The General Frank M. Coxe was an active military vessel on San Francisco Bay from the 1922 to 1947, being decommissioned and sold for surplus in 1947 after the end of World War II.

Prior to the building of the Golden Gate and Bay bridges in the mid-1930s, ground transportation in the Bay Area was hampered by the Bay and the rivers which bisected the region from San Jose to the Sacramento River Delta. However, this region was heavily populated by the Army personnel who garrisoned and maintained the ring of fortresses and ancillary facilities from Fort Point and Fort Cronkite at the mouth of the Bay, to the Benicia Arsenal at the mouth of the Delta. There were two island fortresses: Fort McDowell (Angel Island) and Alcatraz, with each of these becoming special purpose facilities by the time of the General Frank M. Coxe.

By the 1920s, Angel Island and Alcatraz were considered obsolete as artillery positions, with their purposes supplanted by larger coastal guns and extensive electronic mines as the primary coastal defenses. As aircraft developed, these also became irrelevant. Angel Island developed as a processing center for inductees and recruits, and Alcatraz developed into a maximum security military prison. The General Frank M. Coxe provided a regular service between Fort Mason, on the north coast of the San Francisco peninsula, and Fort McDowell on Angel Island, with periodic stops at Alcatraz. The Alcatraz service continued after the Army relinquished control to the Federal Prison Bureau in the mid-1930s.

=== Alcatraz prison break ===
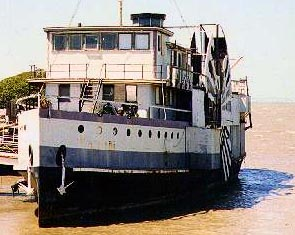
The General Frank M. Coxe prior to restoration, with a dummy paddle wheel constructed on the port side

Alcatraz Prison almost lost one of its boarders when John K. Giles, aged 50, a mail robber and four-time convict, stole an army uniform from the prison laundry and jumped aboard the General Frank M. Coxe just before she departed for Angel Island. Although a count of both the soldiers on the Coxe and the prisoners working on the docks alerted the authorities to an escape, an error in communication and forged documents allowed Giles to land at Fort McDowell. However, a discrepancy in his uniform brought him to the attention of an officer, who then recognized his forged documents and arrested him not knowing of the prison break. Giles was returned to Alcatraz to serve-out his sentence. There was some controversy over whether this constituted a successful escape and a recapture, or a foiled plan. Officially, Alcatraz retained its perfect record as "escape proof" until it closed in the mid-1960s, since it was assumed that all other missing prisoners had drowned.

=== World War II ===
Fort McDowell, after 1932 a facility of the San Francisco Port of Embarkation, became a critical processing center of the for US troops heading to the Pacific theater of battle with U.S. entry into World War II. The early troop processing was substantially divided between Fort McDowell and Fort Mason, and despite the new bridges and highways, ships and ferries were the only connection between the locations. During World War II, the General Frank M. Coxe made as many as eight scheduled trips per day between Fort McDowell and Fort Mason. After activation in May 1942 of Camp Stoneman, the largest troop staging area on the west coast, Fort McDowell continued as a center for processing unassigned enlisted personnel and prisoner of war camp. After satisfying the exigencies of the war, Fort McDowell was eventually phased-out after World War II, and was closed as a processing center prior to the Korean War. By 1947 the General Frank M. Coxe was obsolete and was decommissioned.

== Post military use ==
=== Tour ferry ===
After her military service the General Frank M. Coxe was bought by the Golden Gate Scenic Steamship Line, which now operate the Red & White Fleet of ferry and tour boats on San Francisco Bay. The General Frank M. Coxe was renamed and operated as the SS Frank M. Coxe as a local cruise ship and tour ferry until the 1950s.

=== Restaurant ===
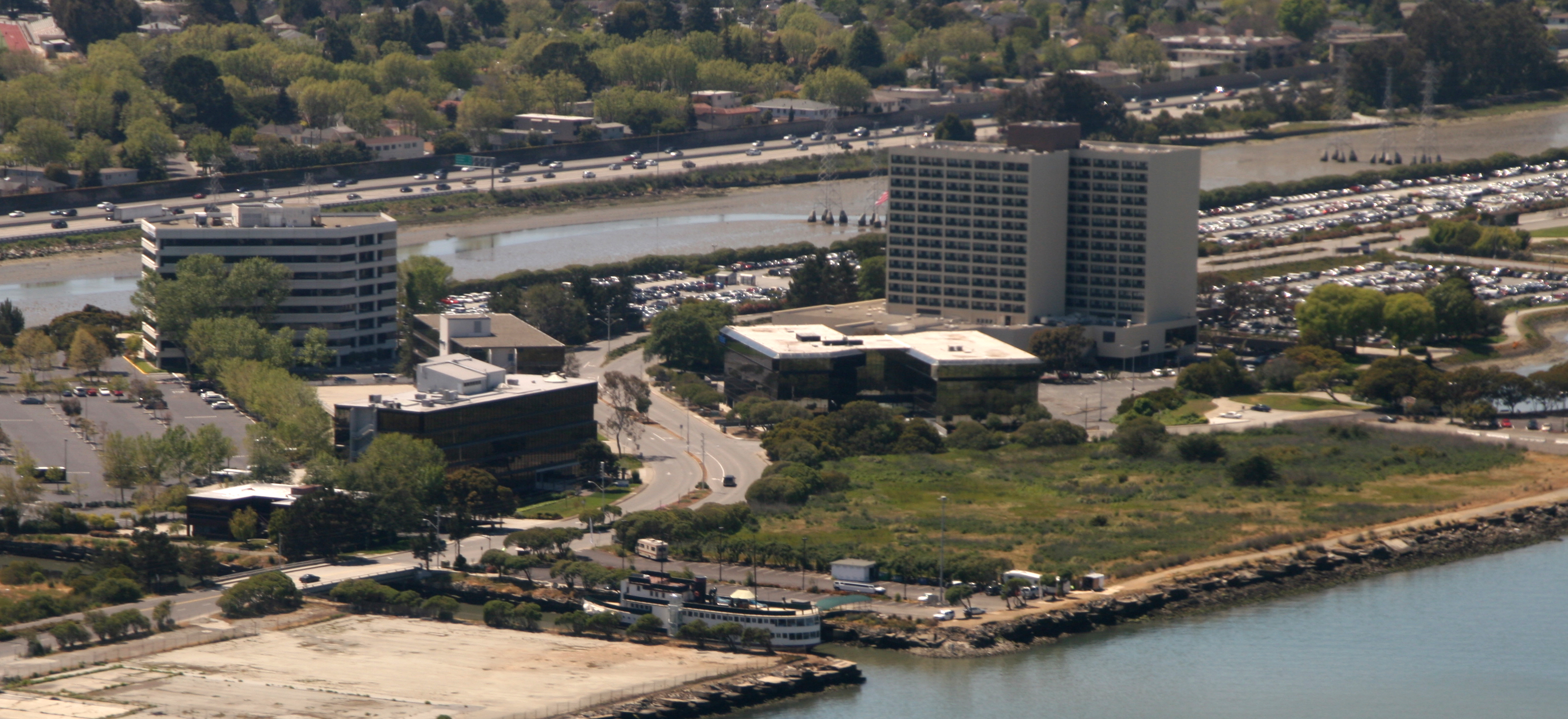
Moored in Burlingame, California (2009)

After retiring as an active vessel, the Frank M. Coxe was converted to a floating restaurant called the Showboat in Stockton, California. The restaurant went through several leases and was operated under several names in various locations. At one point it was a dance club catering to the "under 21" patrons. In the 1960s and 1970s it was berthed at Jack London Square in Oakland, California, and then moved to Burlingame, California and operated as the Pattaya Princess, a Thai restaurant, in the 1970s and 1980s, closing in 1990.

=== Fate ===
From the closing of the Pattaya Princess until 2006, the vessel was a vacant hulk, until local restaurateurs bought the ship from Mr. Robert Sherman, where it remained berthed in San Francisco Bay in Burlingame, California, just south of San Francisco International Airport.

The new owners obtained an extended lease from the City of Burlingame and renovated the vessel. The name of the vessel was changed from the Pattaya Princess to The Sherman in honor of the previous owner, and then was operated as a restaurant of that name.

In 2008, the owner had taken out a loan to repair her, but the loan defaulted and The Sherman went into foreclosure. The State Lands Commission, who owns the land The Sherman rested upon, asked for the vessel to be moved. On June 15, 2014, The Sherman was removed from her location in Burlingame and towed to the Stockton Marina.

The Sherman was towed to Mare Island Naval Shipyard in Vallejo, California and broken up for scrap. The work was completed on January 10, 2020.
