= USAT General John McE. Hyde =

General John McE. Hyde
History

United States
- Builder: Charles Ward Engineering Works, Charleston, West Virginia
- Laid down: 18 July 1921
- Launched: 11 March 1922
- Acquired: delivered 5 December 1922
- Decommissioned: 1942
- Fate: Sunk by Japanese artillery, Corregidor, Philippines 1942

General characteristics
- Type: Troop ferry
- Tonnage: 900 GRT (539 - unspecified)
- Length: 144 ft (44 m) (LBP)
- Beam: 28 ft (8.5 m)
- Depth: 9 ft (2.7 m)
- Propulsion: 2 Ward water tube boilers

General John McE. Hyde was a ferry boat built for the War Department by Charles Ward Engineering Works. The ferry was assigned to provide transportation services among the military facilities in Manila Bay, the Philippines under administrative command of the Coast Artillery Corps.

General John McE. Hyde was sunk during World War II during the Battle of Corregidor, by Japanese aircraft on 26 December 1941 after safely delivering nurses from Manila to establish Hospital #2 at Coclaban. (Note: Barr has a much later date that is contradicted by other sources.)

== Design and construction ==
General John McE. Hyde was among the hundreds of small vessels acquired after the Spanish–American War and during the early part of the twentieth century to support overseas outposts that were owned and operated by the US Army for specific logistical purposes.

This vessel along with a sister-ship, General Frank M. Coxe, was designed and built shortly after World War I, to ferry army personnel within strategic harbors. It was designed by the New York firm of Cox & Stevens, who were renowned Naval Architects specializing in yachts and small commercial and military craft. The Hyde was built in 1921, followed in 1922 by General Frank M. Coxe, to Cox & Stevens design #244. The ships were built on the Kanawha River, by Charles Ward Engineering Works of Charleston, West Virginia, a firm which specialized in shallow draft vessels such as ferries, riverboats, and tugs.

Hyde's keel was laid 18 July 1921 with the launch on 11 March 1922. The ship was delivered to the War Department on 5 December 1922. The vessel was 900 gross tons, 539 tons unspecified measurement in some references, 144 ft (44 m) in length between perpendiculars with a beam of 28 ft (8.5 m) and draft of 9 ft (2.7 m).

== Operations ==
Hyde provided general logistical and passenger service to the island forts and other installations in Manila Bay, including transportation of dependents. In 1932 General John McE. Hyde and Miley, a local vessel, ran daily shuttle schedules on the Corregidor-Manila service with General John McE. Hyde leaving Corregidor on the two and a half-hour run at 8:00 a.m., returning from Manila at 4:00 p.m. and Miley leaving Manila at 10:00 a.m. and returning from Corregidor at 4:00 p.m. The vessel played an important role in garrison life, including social events, as noted in a story from 1939:

The social highlight of the month of March was the reception for the Army and Navy given at Malacanan by President and Mrs. Quezon. Encouraged by an appropriate harbor boat sailing to and from Manila, the captains and field officers donned their shiniest buttons and responded to the invitation in such numbers that the skipper of the Hyde hung out the SRO sign on the trip home.

On 25 December 1941 twenty nurses were evacuated from Manila aboard Hyde destined for Hospital #2 at Coclaban with vessel lost to air attack with medical supplies for the hospital shortly after.

== Bibliography ==
- National Park Service – Maritime Heritage Program Historic Ships to Visit – Listed by Name, specifications of the Coxe
- Mystic Seaport Museum, Inc. Coll. 34, Daniel S. Gregory Ships Plans Library
