= Cox & Stevens =

Cox & Stevens began in 1905 as a yacht design and commercial brokerage in New York City. The original principal partners were Daniel H. Cox, Irving Cox, and marine engineer Colonel Edwin Augustus Stevens Jr., son of renowned designer Edwin Augustus Stevens.

Daniel Cox was also in partnership with William Francis Gibbs. After the company reorganized in 1932, the firm of Gibbs & Cox, Inc., took on the larger commercial work, while Cox & Stevens continued the yacht design and smaller military and commercial projects.

During World War II, the military portion of the firm's work expanded. For a while there were close to 500 designers working on vessels for the two-ocean war that required combat, transport, and supply vessels of many sizes.

Philip Rhodes joined Cox & Stevens in 1934, and became head naval architect for the firm, after the death of head designer, Bruno Tornroth in 1935. After World War II, in 1947, Cox & Stevens was renamed Philip L. Rhodes Naval Architects and Marine Engineers and continued to do a great deal of commercial and military work. The firm closed in 1974 after Rhodes died.

== Notable Cox & Stevens designs ==
- USAT General Frank M. Coxe US Army ferry
- USAT General John McE. Hyde US Army ferry
- USS Vamarie (IX-47)
- USS Winchester (SP-156)
- USS Argus (PY-14)
- USS Opal (PYc-8) (formerly Irving T. Bush's and Marian Spore Bush's Coronet)
- USCGC Arbutus
- Dickenson, supply and personnel transport cable-repair ship of the Commercial Pacific Cable Company based in Honolulu serving cable stations at Midway and Fanning Island. War service as USS Kailua (IX-71).
- Lotosland (yacht) for Edward A. Deeds, first to incorporate aircraft capability
- Mandalay (formerly E. F. Hutton's Hussar IV)
- Rhodes 19
- Sea Cloud (formerly E. F. Hutton's Hussar V)
- Seawanhaka (schooner)
- Southern Cross, 425 foot motor yacht (Howard Hughes)
- Talitha G, motor yacht (originally Russell A. Alger Jr.'s Reveler)
- Vamarie (ketch)
- Virginia (schooner)

== Notable employees ==
- Eugene Turenne Gregorie
