= Edwin Augustus Stevens Jr. =

US army officer, marine engineer, & naval architect (1858-1918)

- Born: March 14, 1858; Philadelphia, Pennsylvania, U.S.
- Died: March 8, 1918 (aged 59); Washington, D.C., U.S.
- Education: St. Paul's School
- Alma mater: Princeton University; Stevens Institute of Technology
- Spouse: Emily Contee Lewis (m. 1879)
- Children: 8
- Parents: Edwin Augustus Stevens (father); Martha Bayard Dod (mother)
- Relatives: Richard Stevens (brother); See Stevens Family

Edwin Augustus Stevens Jr. (March 14, 1858 – March 8, 1918) was an army officer, marine engineer, and naval architect. He was among the founders of Cox & Stevens in 1905, which became an influential and successful New York design firm.

== Early life ==
Stevens was born in Philadelphia in 1858, the son of Martha Bayard Dod (1831–1899) and Edwin Augustus Stevens (1795–1868), a well-known designer and founder of the Stevens Institute of Technology, and nephew of John Cox Stevens, founder of the New York Yacht Club and a driving force in the design of the yacht America and the competition for the America's Cup.

He attended St. Paul's School in Concord, New Hampshire and then entered Princeton University, graduating with an A.B. degree in 1879. He then enrolled at the Stevens Institute of Technology, graduating as an engineer.

== Career ==
His most notable personal achievement was the propeller driven double ended ferry, which is the most typical vehicle ferry in use today. The significance of his design was a shaft which could control propellers at both ends of the craft. Among the advantages was superior braking of the vessels, since paddle wheel propulsion systems could not effectively be reversed to slow the craft. Prior to propeller drives, double ended ferries had less usable width because of side wheel propulsion.

Cox & Stevens began in 1905 as a yacht design and commercial brokerage in New York City. The original principal partners were Daniel H. Cox, Irving Cox, and Edwin Augustus Stevens Jr. The firm continued under various names until the 1970s.

From 1911 to 1917, he was the New Jersey Commissioner of Public Roads of the State Highway Commission, a predecessor to the New Jersey Department of Transportation.

== Personal life ==
On October 28, 1879, he married Emily Contee Lewis (1857–1931) of Virginia. She was the great-granddaughter of Lawrence Lewis (1767-1839), George Washington's nephew, and Eleanor Parke Custis Lewis, Washington's adopted daughter and step-granddaughter. Together, they had eight children:

- John Stevens VI (1881–1932), who died unmarried.
- Edwin Augustus Stevens III (1882–1954), who died unmarried.
- Washington Lewis Stevens (1883–1946), who married Nannie Nye Jackson in 1905.
- Bayard Stevens (1885–1927)
- Martha Bayard Stevens (1886–1888), who died young.
- Basil Martiau Stevens (1888–1957), who married Helen Conro Ward (1891–1943)
- Lawrence Lewis Stevens (1889–1958), who became an actuary and who married Anne D. Malpass (1890–1974).
- Emily Custis Lewis Stevens (1896–1963), who died unmarried.

Stevens died in 1918, six days before his 60th birthday, in Washington, D.C., where he was serving as a shipyard inspector under appointment by President Woodrow Wilson.
