= USS Vamarie =

Former U.S. Navy Academy raceboat

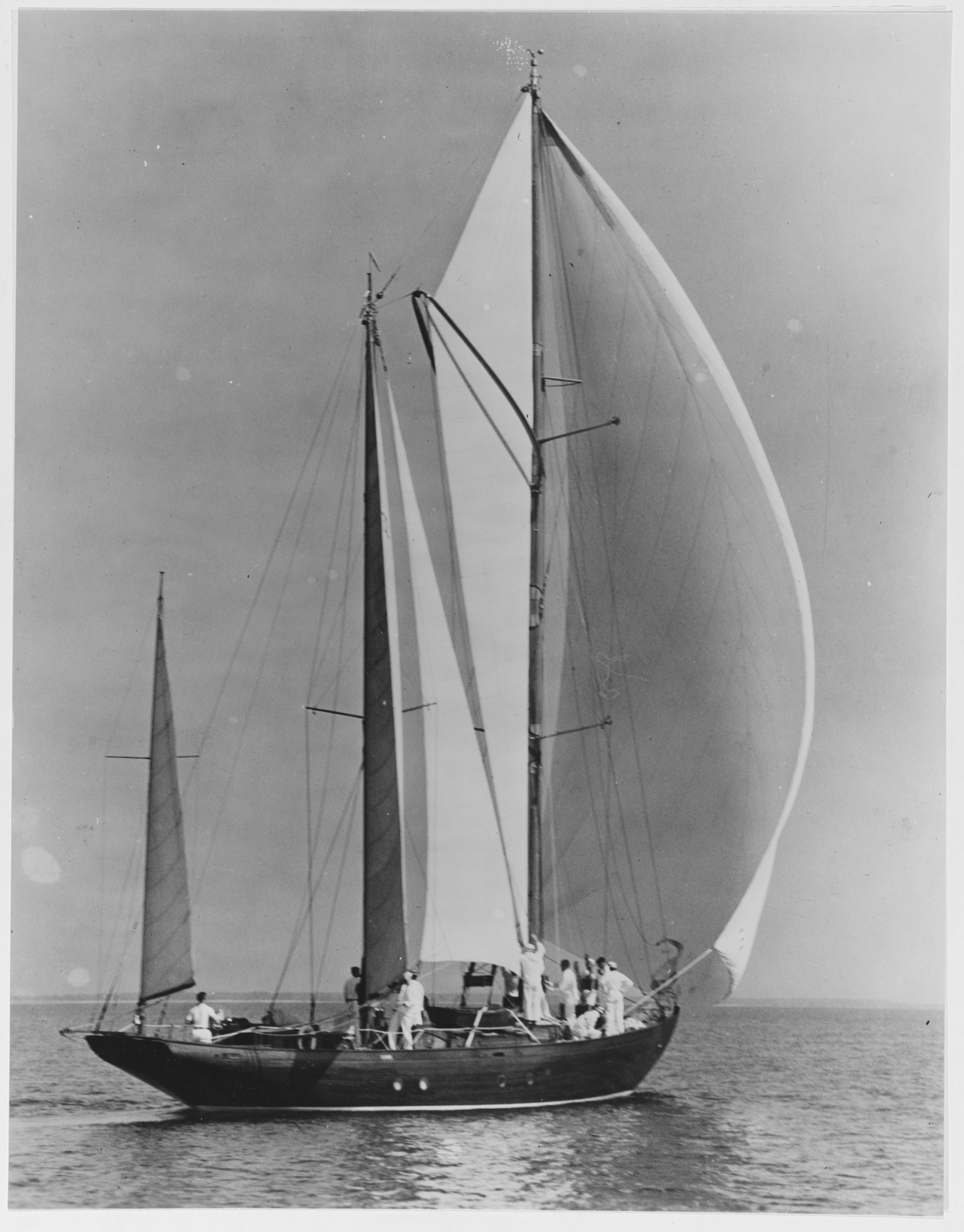
- USS Vamarie, The Navy's entry in the New London - Annapolis Race, starting 24 June 1939.

History

United States
- Name: USS Vamarie
- Builder: Abeking and Rasmussen, Bremen, Germany
- Launched: 1933
- Acquired: 11 November 1936
- Commissioned: 10 November 1944
- Decommissioned: 24 February 1955
- Stricken: 22 June 1955
- Fate: Broken up, December 1955

General characteristics
- Type: Ketch-rigged ocean racing yacht
- Tonnage: 45 GT
- Length: 70 ft 2 in (21.39 m)
- Beam: 15 ft 3 in (4.65 m)
- Draft: 10 ft 4 in (3.15 m)
- Complement: 14

USS Vamarie (IX-47) was a ketch-rigged ocean racing yacht designed by Jasper Morgan of Cox & Stevens, Inc., and built in 1933 at Bremen, Germany, by Abeking and Rasmussen, for Vadim S. Makaroff of Oyster Bay, Long Island.

With Makaroff at the helm, the slim racing yacht participated in nine ocean races between 1934 and 1936, sailing over 30,000 miles. Donated to the Regiment of Midshipmen at the United States Naval Academy, Annapolis, Maryland, on 11 November 1936, Vamarie served as the Navy's racing yacht in local races in Chesapeake Bay during the racing season in 1937. The following summer, on 22 June 1938, Vamarie was entered in the race from Newport, Rhode Island, to Bermuda marking the first time that the yacht returned to "blue water" in two years. Four days later, the yacht, commanded by Capt. John F. Shafroth, came in 18th out of 22 vessels in her class and 29th out of the 44 total entries.

Vamarie participated in further local races into 1939. On 8 March 1940 she was classified IX-47. The yacht was officially assigned to the Naval Academy on 22 October 1940 and was placed in service on 10 November 1944. She operated under the aegis of the Severn River Naval Command until authorized for disposal on 24 February 1955. Struck from the Navy List on 22 June 1955, Vamarie was broken up in December of the same year.
