= John K. Giles =

American criminal

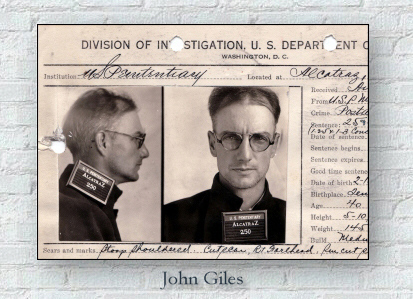
- John K. Giles mug shots, 1935
- Born: February 16, 1895; Elgin, Tennessee
- Died: February 8, 1979 (aged 83); Sierra Madre, California
- Known for: Prisoner on Alcatraz

John Knight Giles (February 16, 1895 – February 8, 1979) was an inmate at Alcatraz prison, most well known for an escape attempt in 1945. He was originally sentenced to the United States Penitentiary on May 11, 1935, for attempted robbery of the Denver and Rio Grande Western mail train; he had previously been serving a life sentence in Oregon for murder before escaping. Giles began serving his federal sentence for the attempted train robbery at McNeil Island on June 17, 1935, but due to his escape record and the length of his sentence, was transferred to Alcatraz Island on August 28, 1935.

== Escape attempt ==
On July 31, 1945, at 10:40 a.m., the Army ferry USAT General Frank M. Coxe pulled into the Alcatraz Wharf. Giles, wearing an Army Technical Sergeant's uniform that he had been able to steal while working in the laundry that was contracted to clean army uniforms, jumped aboard the boat through a freight hatchway below deck. As the boat pulled away, a count of the soldiers on board indicated one extra, and at the same time, a count of the Alcatraz dock workers indicated one missing convict. Assistant Warden E.J. Miller was notified, and he followed the Army boat in a small speedboat until it reached Fort McDowell on Angel Island. Alcatraz officials called ahead to Fort McDowell, instructing them to keep everyone on the boat. The boat captain took this to mean nobody was to disembark without a pass. Giles showed his pass and was allowed to exit the boat. (According to Alcatraz Warden Johnston, it should have been called a successful escape, but the Bureau of Prisons and the Attorney General classified it as an attempted escape.)

While on board, Giles was unaware that he was being followed. He talked to fellow passengers and told them he was a "lineman working on the cable".

== Capture, aftermath, and death ==
After Giles left the boat, he was questioned by Lieutenant Gordon L. Kilgore, the Fort McDowell officer of the day. Kilgore had noticed that Giles' uniform appeared incorrect. After inspecting the pass and realizing it was a bad forgery, Giles was detained and eventually turned over to Assistant Warden Miller. By 11 a.m., he was headed back to Alcatraz.

The story of Giles' capture and his attempted escape were profiled on the radio program Gang Busters in 1945. He died in 1979 in California.

== See also ==
- List of Alcatraz escape attempts
- List of prison escapes
