= P.A. Denny (ship) =

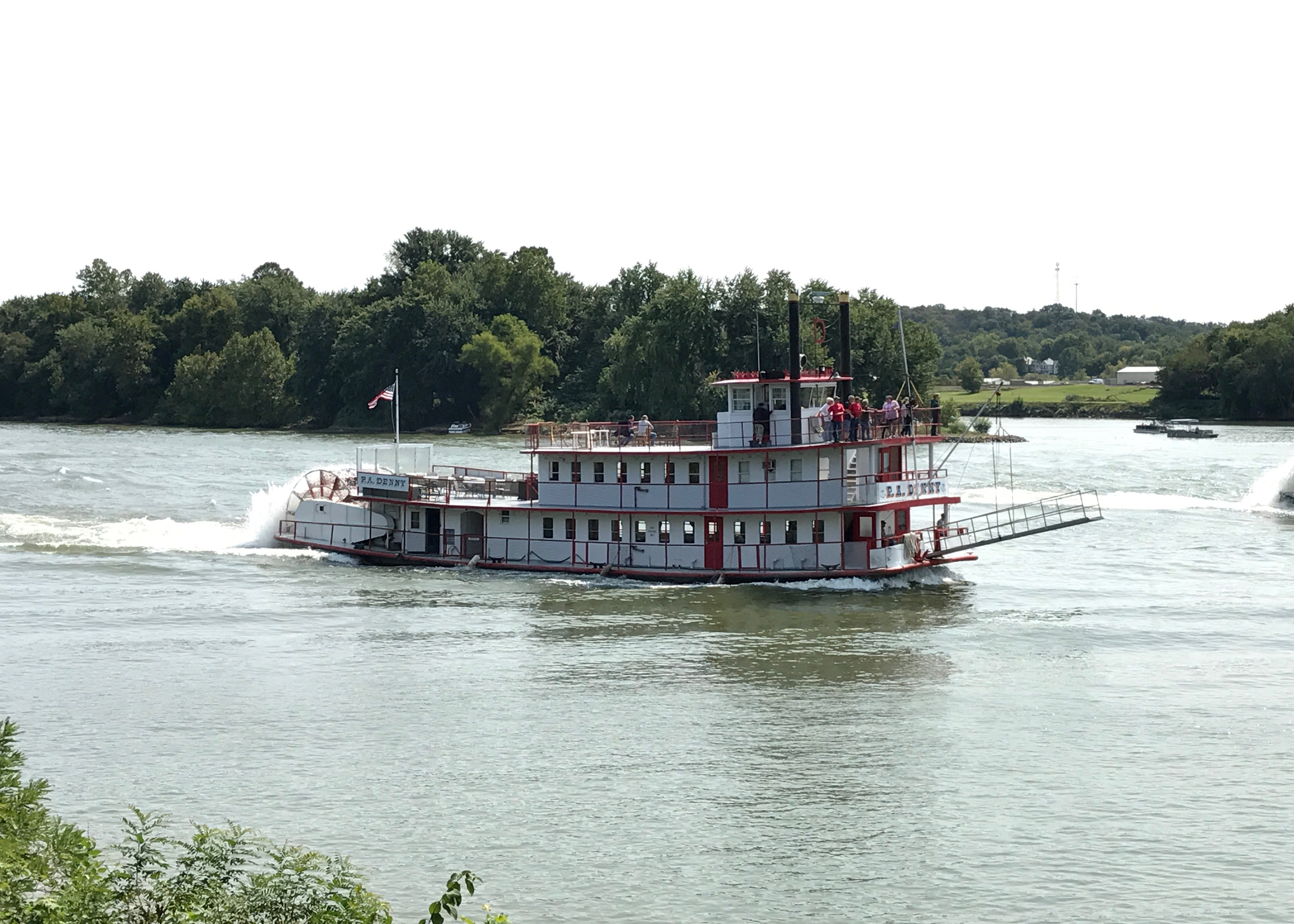
- P.A. Denny participating in the Ohio River Sternwheel Festival races. Marietta, Ohio September 10th, 2017.

History
- Name: Scott (1930–1973); Robin D Too (1973–1975); P.A. Denny (1975–)
- Namesake: Addison Scott; Peter Anthony Denny
- Owner: United States Army Corps of Engineers (1930–1954); Howard Powell & Son (1954–1973); Pete Denny (1973–1975); Pratt Mining Company (1975–); Ohio River Valley Water Sanitation Commission (2004–)
- Builder: Charles Ward Engineering Works
- Launched: 1930

General characteristics
- Type: Sternwheeler
- Length: 109 ft (33 m)
- Decks: 3

P.A. Denny is a 109-foot (33 m) long three-deck paddle wheel boat that cruised the Kanawha River in the eastern United States for nearly three decades as a tour boat. It provided excursions and parties, before leaving for Ohio in August 2004.

P.A. Denny is now based in Cincinnati, Ohio operated by the Ohio River Valley Water Sanitation Commission's educational foundation. It is renamed the P.A. Denny River Education Center and is used as a floating classroom, with periodic excursions. The facility is designed to introduce 4th through 12th graders to science and ecology concepts. P.A. Denny features labs and equipment for the students' use during their four- or five-hour voyage.

In October 2010 The Heckerts bought the PA Denny and took it to Parkersburg WV .

The Heckerts are putting a plan together to put the PA Denny back in service in the near future. Plans are being worked on as of 1/01/2016 to restore the Denny and get the recertification done in order to return the PA Denny to transporting people around the river.

== History ==
The ship was built as the Scott, in Charleston, West Virginia, by Charles Ward Engineering Works in 1930 and served the United States Army Corps of Engineers in Louisville for 24 years.

Charleston river man Peter Anthony Denny bought the boat and led it to victory in the 1974 Stern-wheel Regatta Race in Charleston. After his death, a longtime friend, Captain Lawson Hamilton bought the boat and named it P.A. Denny. P.A. Denny participated in the World's Fair in New Orleans in the early 1980s.

As of January 2009, the ORSANCO Educational Foundation has changed its name to the Foundation for Ohio River Education (FORE), which is primarily operated from the P.A.Denny River Education Center, currently docking in Covington, Kentucky. Classes offered on board include Land Use and Watersheds, Water Chemistry, Aquatic Biota, and Ecological Impacts for the high school and college cruises. For elementary and middle school students, Planktomania, Critter Counting (macroinvertebrate identification), Fish Ecology, and Rate Your River.

== See also ==
- Paddle steamer
- Riverboat
