= WJFP =

Radio station in Chester, Pennsylvania

- Chester, Pennsylvania; United States
- Broadcast area: Philadelphia metropolitan area
- Frequency: 740 kHz
- Branding: Liberty Radio

Programming
- Format: Conservative talk
- Affiliations: Red Apple Media; Westwood One; Salem Radio Network; Pittsburgh Steelers

Ownership
- Owner: John Fredericks; (Disruptor Radio, LLC)

History
- First air date: April 4, 1948
- Former call signs: WVCH (1947–2022)
- Call sign meaning: John Fredericks (owner) in Philadelphia

Technical information
- Licensing authority: FCC
- Facility ID: 74166
- Class: D
- Power: 1,000 watts (day); 6 watts (night)
- Transmitter coordinates: 39°52′38.00″N 75°24′24.00″W
- Translator: 103.3 W277DL (Chester)

Links
- Public license information: Public file; LMS
- Webcast: Listen live
- Website: wjfpradio.com

WJFP (740 AM) is a commercial radio station licensed to Chester, Pennsylvania, United States, and serves the Philadelphia metropolitan area with a conservative talk format. It is owned by John Fredericks, with the license held by Disruptor Radio, LLC. Fredericks also owns three stations in Virginia.

The transmitter is off Dutton Mill Road in Brookhaven, Pennsylvania. Programming is also heard on FM translator W277DL (103.3 FM) in Chester.

== History ==
On April 4, 1948, the station first signed on the air. The call sign from its founding until early 2022 was WVCH, standing for the "Voice of Chester". It was originally a 250-watt daytimer. It later boosted its power to 1,000 watts and got nighttime authorization at low power.

For most of its history, WVCH carried a Christian talk and teaching format branded as simply "WVCH, The Christian Station." One of the programs carried on WVCH in the 1950s was George A. Palmer's popular Morning Cheer weekday broadcast.

On November 15, 2021, RadioInsight.com reported that WVCH and translator W277DL would be sold to John Fredricks of the MAGA Radio Network through Disruptor Media, LLC, for $500,000. On February 16, 2022, the station flipped to a conservative talk format as "Liberty Radio". The sale was consummated on March 1, 2022, with the station's call sign changing to WJFP the following day.

== Programming ==
Weekdays begin with a talk show hosted by the owner, John Fredericks, and syndicated to other stations. The remainder of the schedule includes nationally syndicated talk hosts including Bill O'Reilly, John Catsimatidis, Rita Cosby, Dominic Carter and Red Eye Radio.

During the football season, WJFP carries Pittsburgh Steelers games.
