= Riverboat =

Watercraft designed for inland navigation

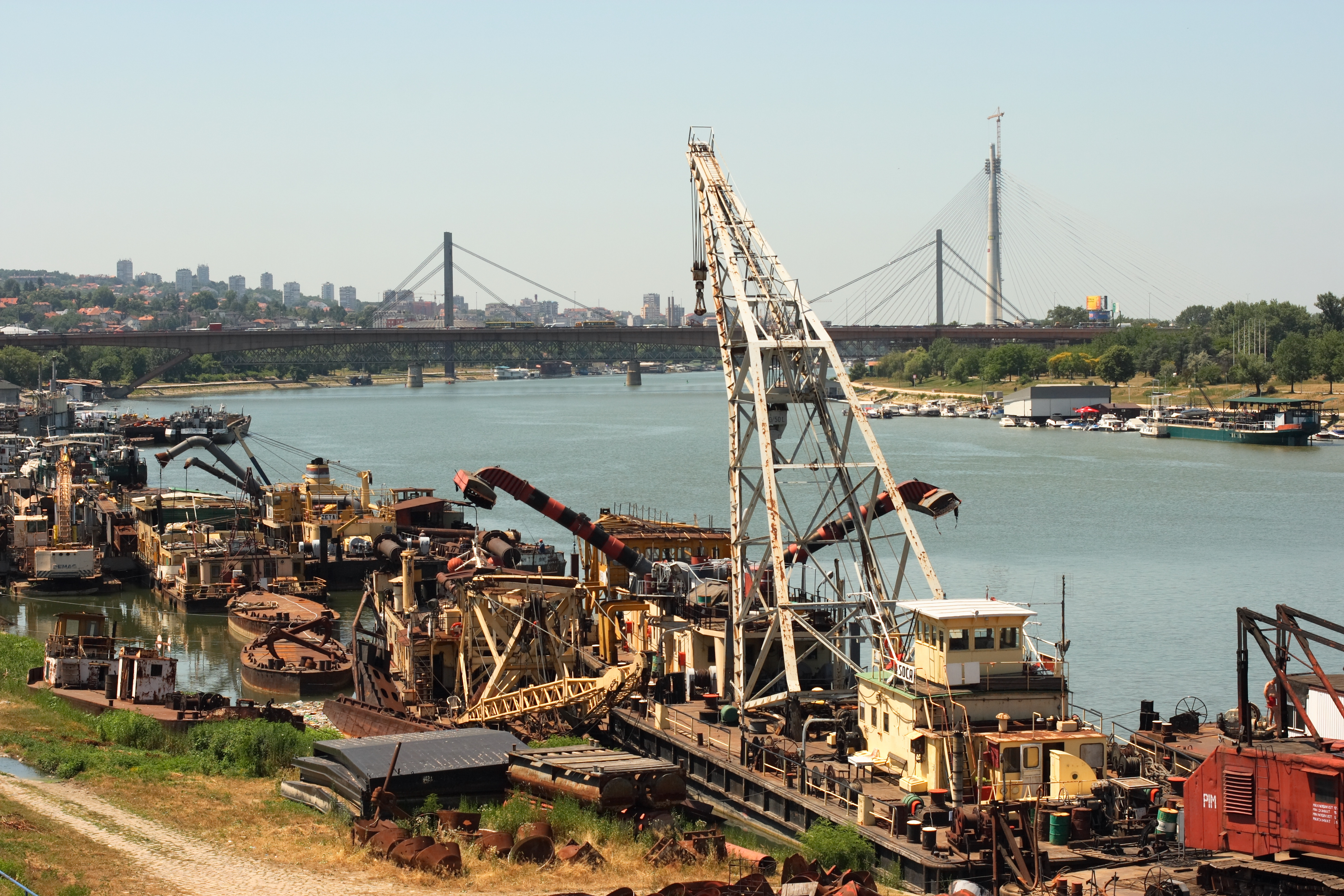
Various service riverboats, Belgrade

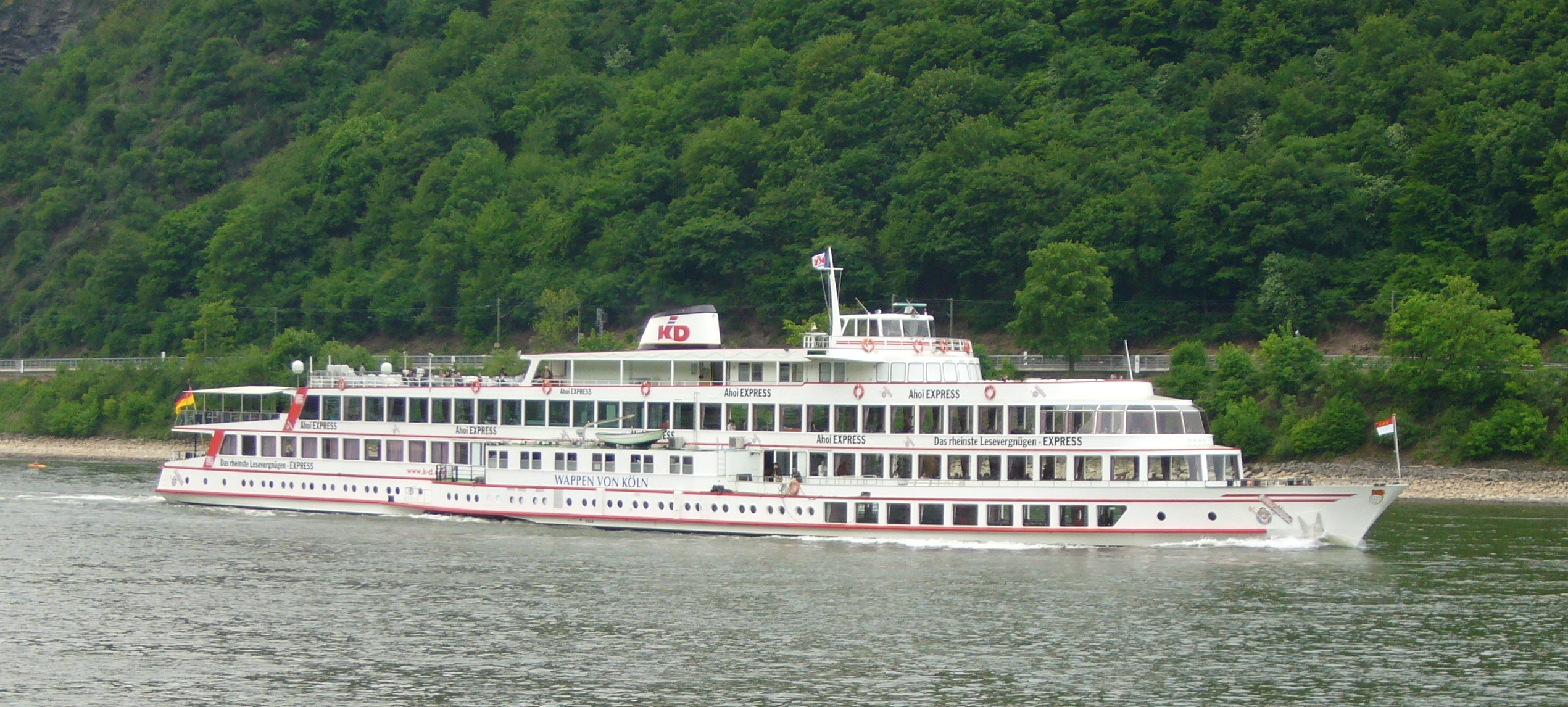
Passenger tourboat of Köln-Düsseldorfer on the river Rhine

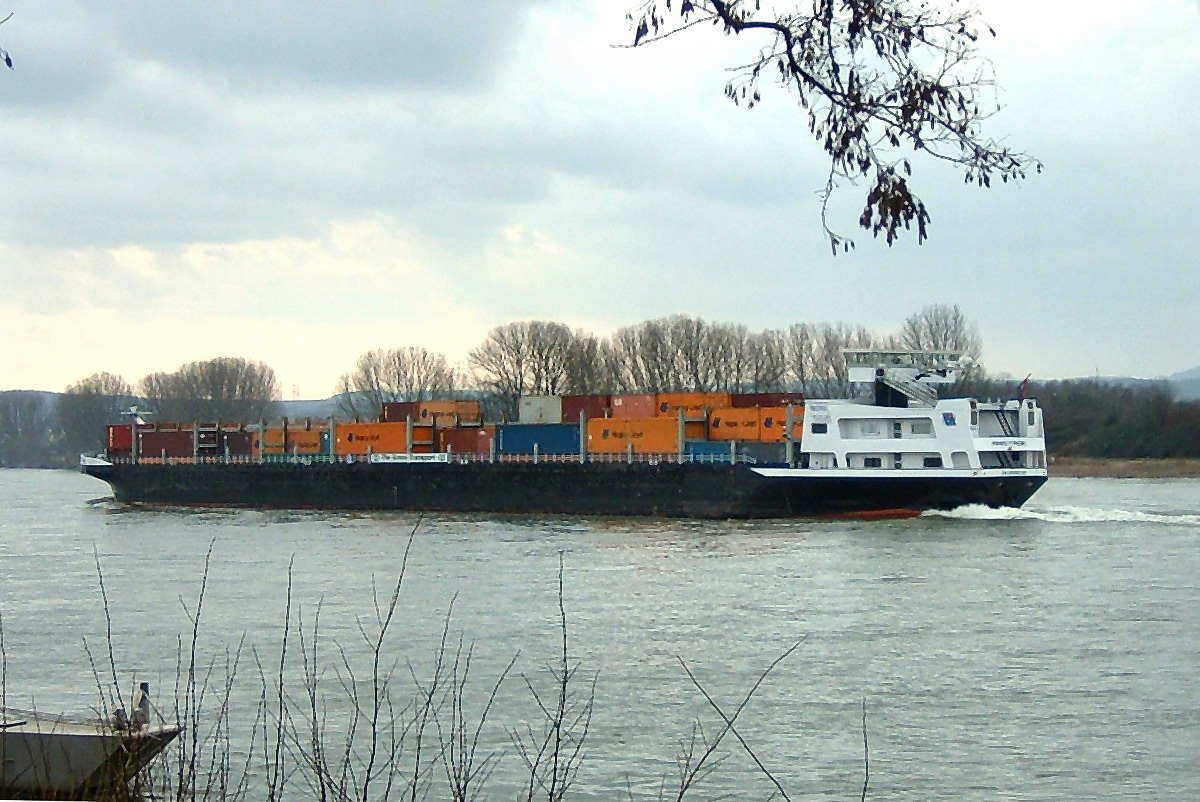
A riverboat-"container ship" with the capacity for 500 intermodal containers of the TEU size.

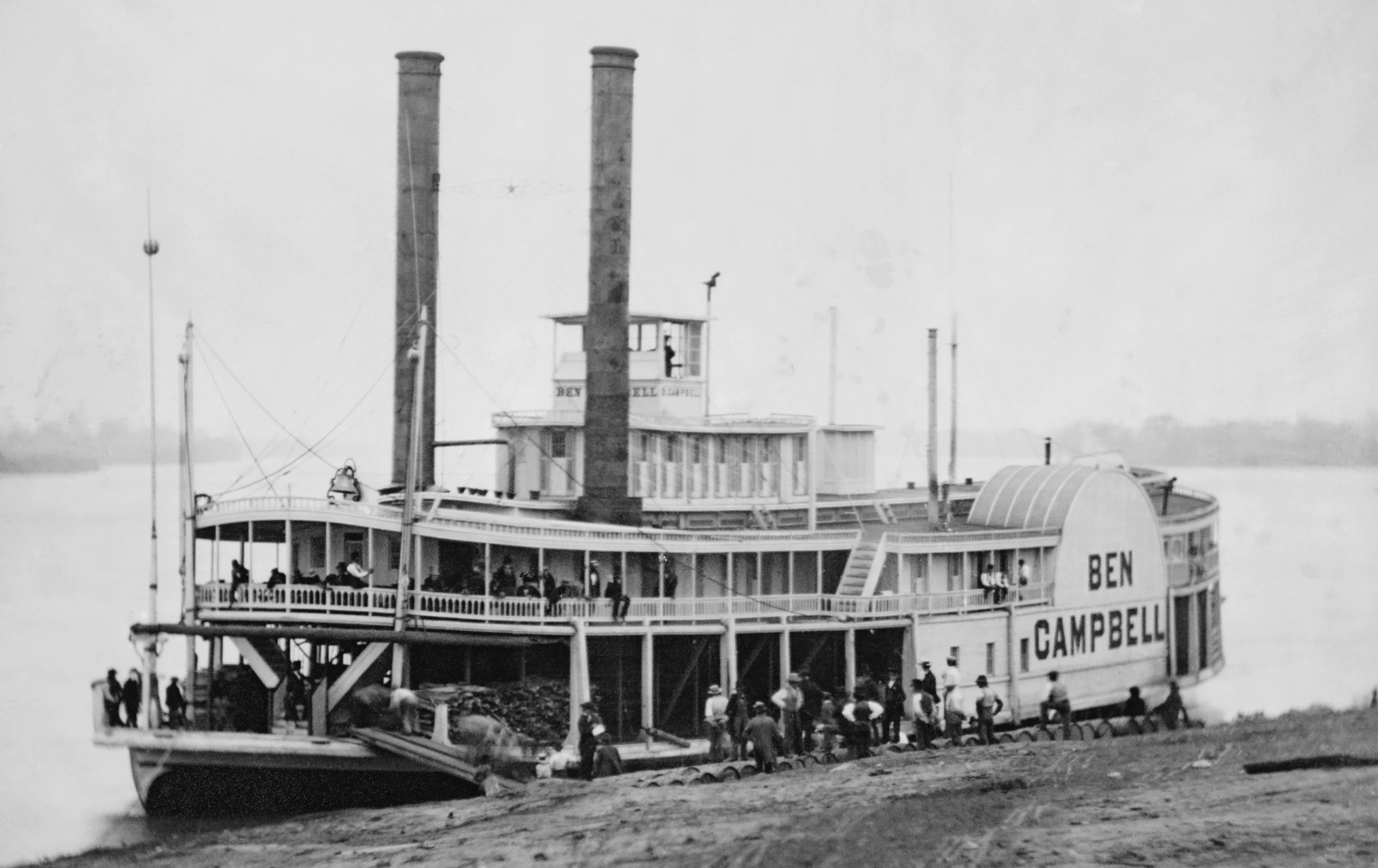
A Mississippi River System-type riverboat, from an 1850s daguerreotype.

A riverboat is a watercraft designed for inland navigation on lakes, rivers, and artificial waterways. They are generally equipped and outfitted as work boats in one of the carrying trades, for freight or people transport, including luxury units constructed for entertainment enterprises, such as lake or harbour tour boats. As larger water craft, virtually all riverboats are especially designed and constructed, or alternatively, constructed with special-purpose features that optimize them as riverine or lake service craft, for instance, dredgers, survey boats, fisheries management craft, fireboats and law enforcement patrol craft.

== Design differences ==
Riverboats are usually less sturdy than ships built for the open seas, with limited navigational and rescue equipment, as they do not have to withstand the high winds or large waves characteristic to large lakes, seas or oceans. They can thus be built from light composite materials. They are limited in size by width and depth of the river as well as the height of bridges spanning the river. They can be designed with shallow drafts, as were the paddle wheel steamers on the Mississippi River that could operate in water under two metres deep.

While a ferry is often used to cross a river, a riverboat is used to travel along the course of the river, while carrying passengers or cargo, or both, for revenue. (Vessels like riverboat casinos are excepted, as they are essentially stationary.)

The significance of riverboats is dependent on the number of navigable rivers and channels as well as the condition of the road and rail network. Generally speaking, riverboats provide slow but cheap transport especially suited for bulk cargo and containers.

== History ==
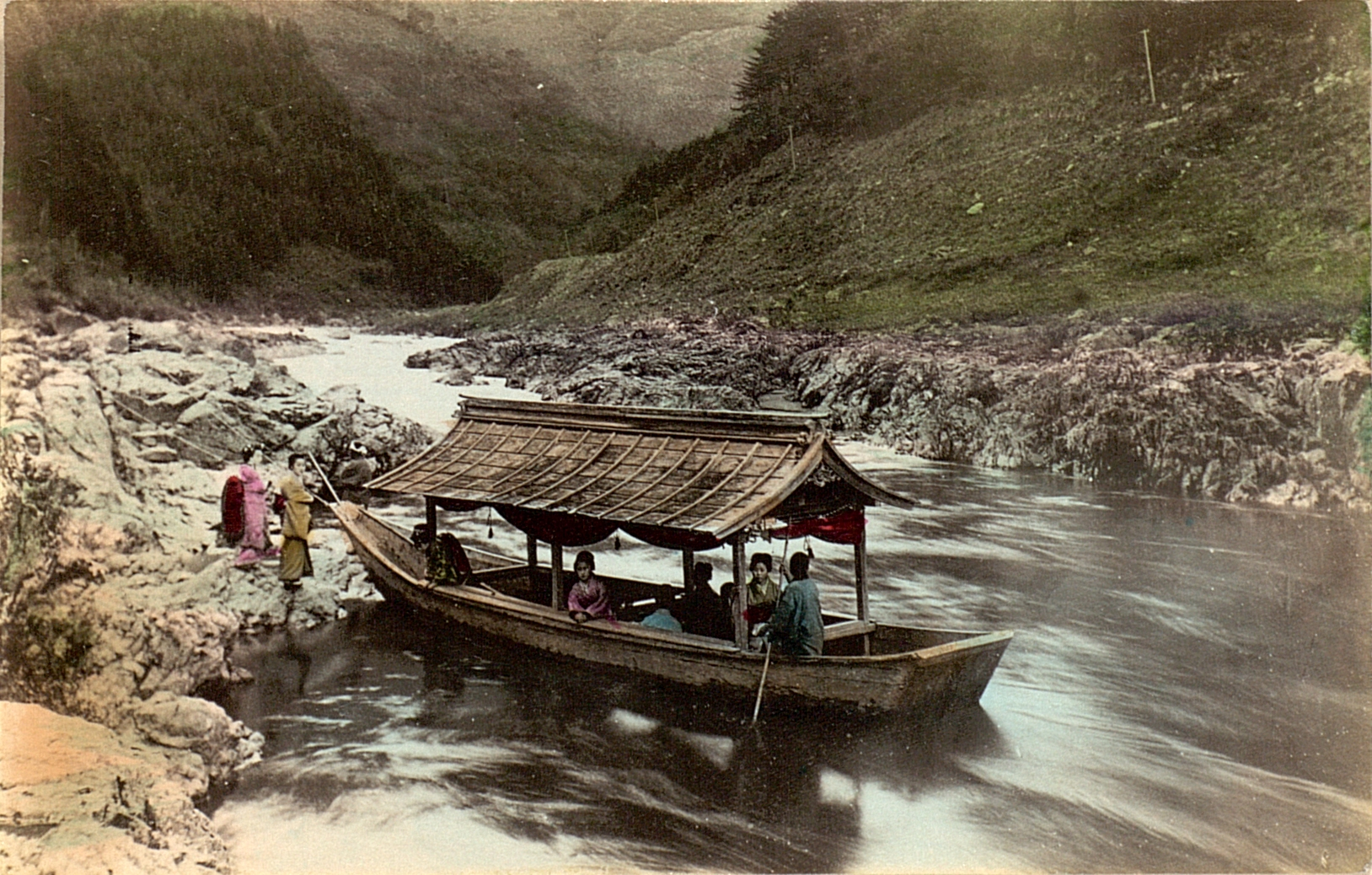
Riverboat with passengers, Japan, 1909

As early as 20,000 BC people started fishing in rivers and lakes using rafts and dugouts. Roman sources dated 50 BC mention extensive transportation of goods and people on the river Rhine. Upstream, boats were usually powered by sails or oars. In the Middle Ages, towpaths were built along most waterways to use working animals or people to pull riverboats. In the 19th century, steamboats became common.

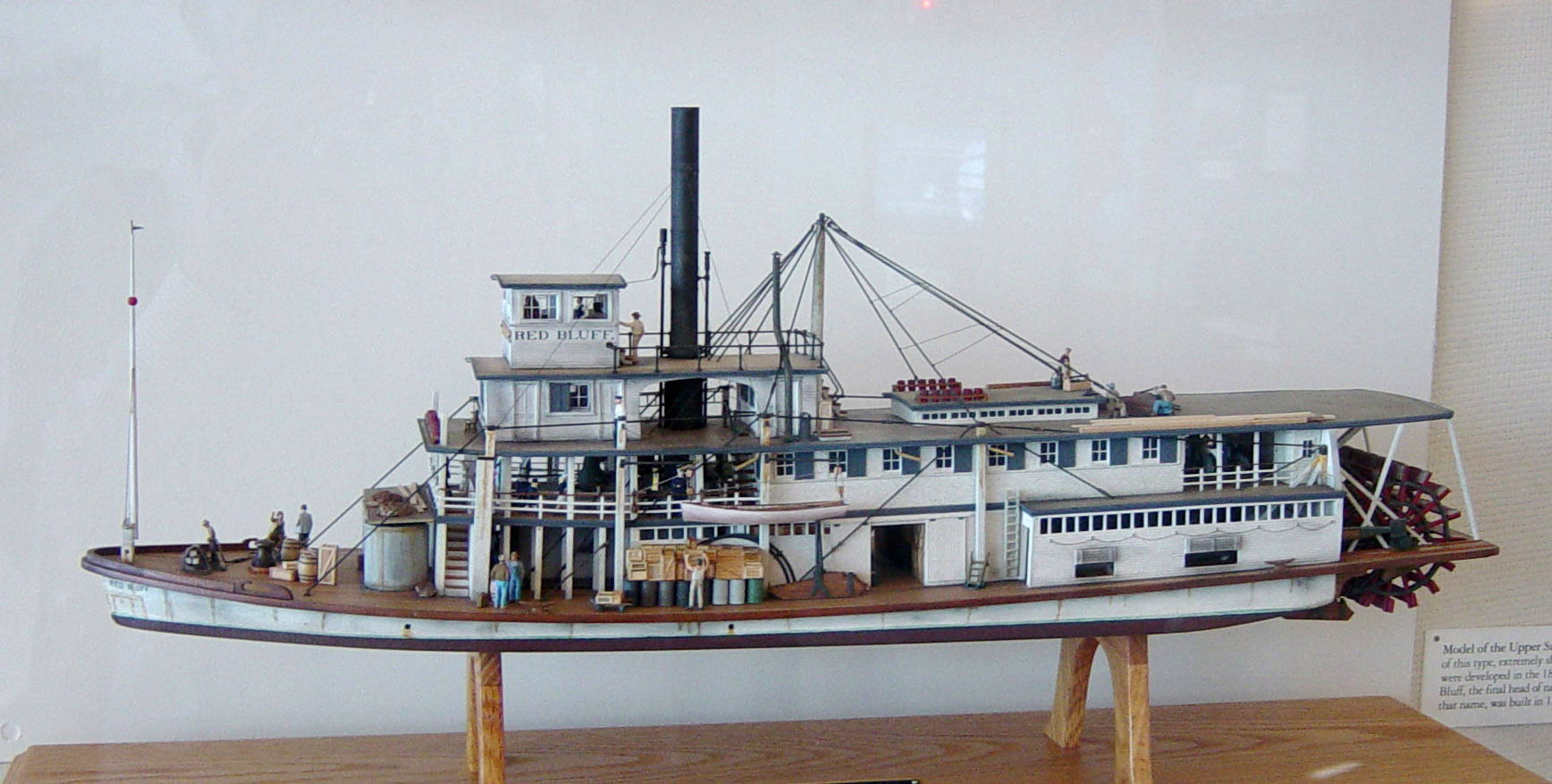
Model of an early 20th-century shallow draft stern wheel riverboat, the Upper Sacramento River steamer Red Bluff.

The most famous riverboats were on the rivers of the midwestern and central southern United States, on the Mississippi, Ohio and Missouri rivers in the early 19th century. Out west, riverboats were common transportation on the Colorado, Columbia, and Sacramento rivers. These American riverboats were designed to draw very little water, and in fact it was commonly said that they could "navigate on a heavy dew".

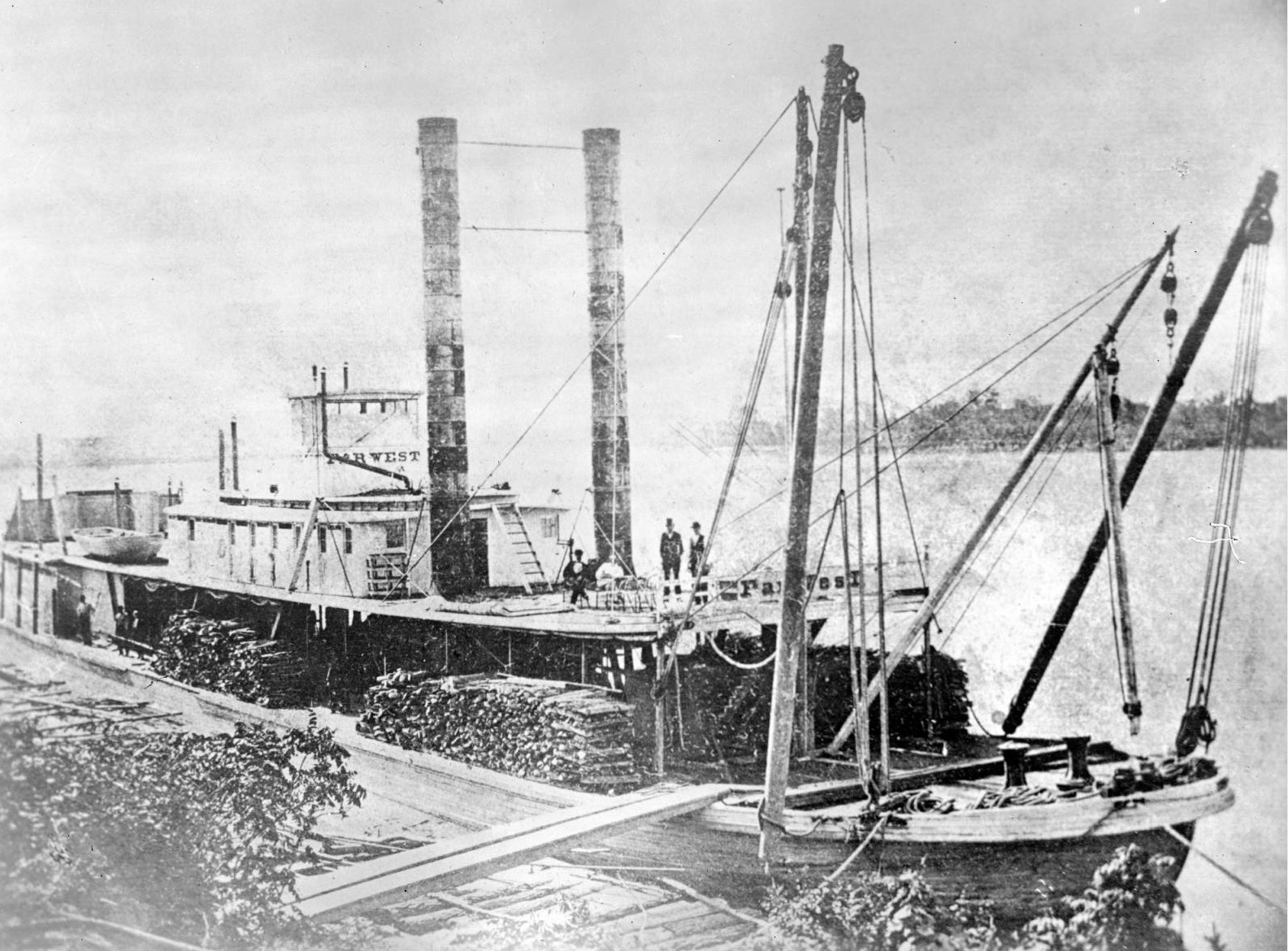
The Far West went down in history for various reasons, such as providing transportation for the Custer expedition at the Little Big Horn. The boat was commanded by the famous Missouri River captain Grant Marsh.

Australia has a history of riverboats. Australia's biggest river, the Murray, has an inland port called Echuca. Many large riverboats were working on the Murray, but now a lower water level is stopping them. The Kalgan River in Western Australia has had two main riverboats, the Silver Star, 1918 to 1935, would lower her funnel to get under the low bridge. Today, the Kalgan Queen riverboat takes tourists up the river to taste the local wines. She lowers her roof to get under the same bridge.

It is these early steam-driven river craft that typically come to mind when "steamboat" is mentioned, as these were powered by burning wood, with iron boilers drafted by a pair of tall smokestacks belching smoke and cinders, and twin double-acting pistons driving a large paddlewheel at the stern, churning foam. This type of propulsion was an advantage as a rear paddlewheel operates in an area clear of snags, is easily repaired, and is not likely to suffer damage in a grounding. By burning wood, the boat could consume fuel provided by woodcutters along the shore of the river. These early boats carried a brow (a short bridge) on the bow, so they could head in to an unimproved shore for transfer of cargo and passengers.

Modern riverboats are generally screw (propeller)-driven, with pairs of diesel engines of several thousand horsepower.

The standard reference for the development of the steamboat is Steamboats on Western Rivers: An Economic and Technological History by Louis C. Hunter (1949).

Terrace, British Columbia, Canada, celebrates "Riverboat Days" each summer. The Skeena River passes through Terrace and played a crucial role during the age of the steamboat. The first steam-powered vessel to enter the Skeena was the Union in 1864. In 1866 the Mumford attempted to ascend the river but was only able to reach the Kitsumkalum River. It was not until 1891 that the Hudson's Bay Company sternwheeler the Caledonia successfully negotiated through the Kitselas Canyon and reached Hazelton. A number of other steamers were built around the turn of the century, in part due to the growing fish industry and the gold rush.

The WT Preston, a museum ship that was once a specialised river dredge, also called a "snagboat".

== Modern riverboats ==
=== Luxury tourist transport ===
Some large riverboats are comparable in accommodation, food service, and entertainment to a modern oceanic cruise ship. Tourist boats provide a scenic and relaxing trip through the segment they operate in.

On the Yangtze River, typically employees have double duties: both as serving staff and as evening-costumed dancers.

Tourist riverboats

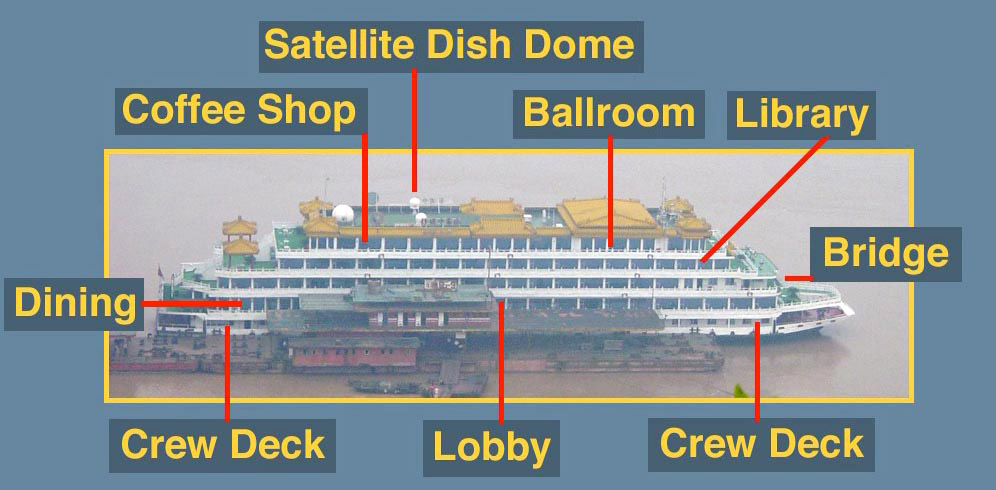
A riverboat on the Yangtze

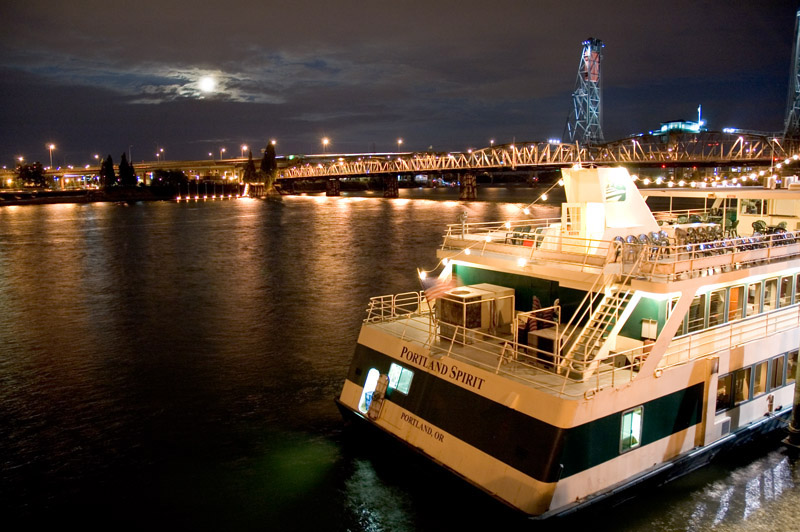
A riverboat on the Willamette River, Oregon

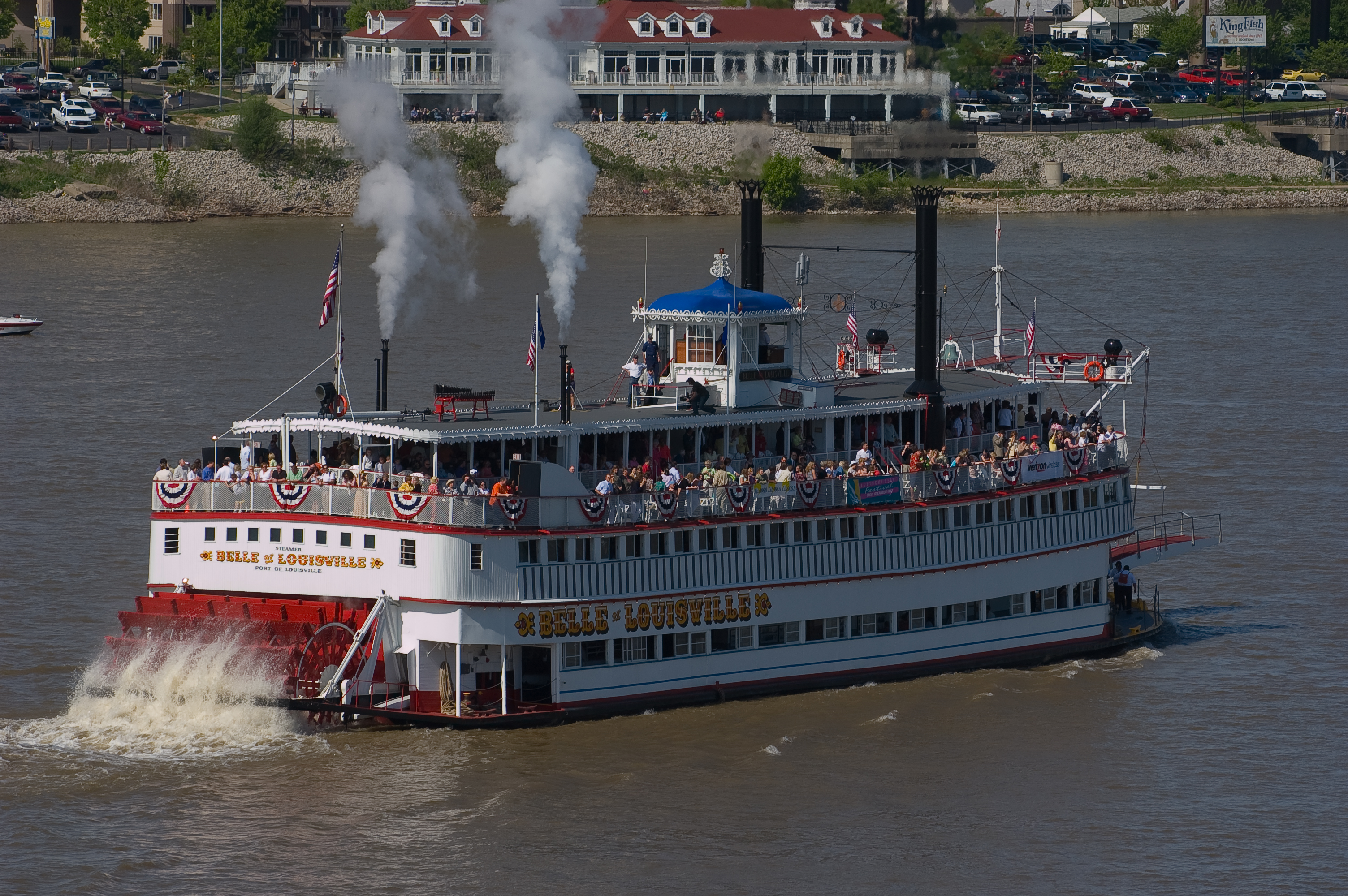
Belle of Louisville

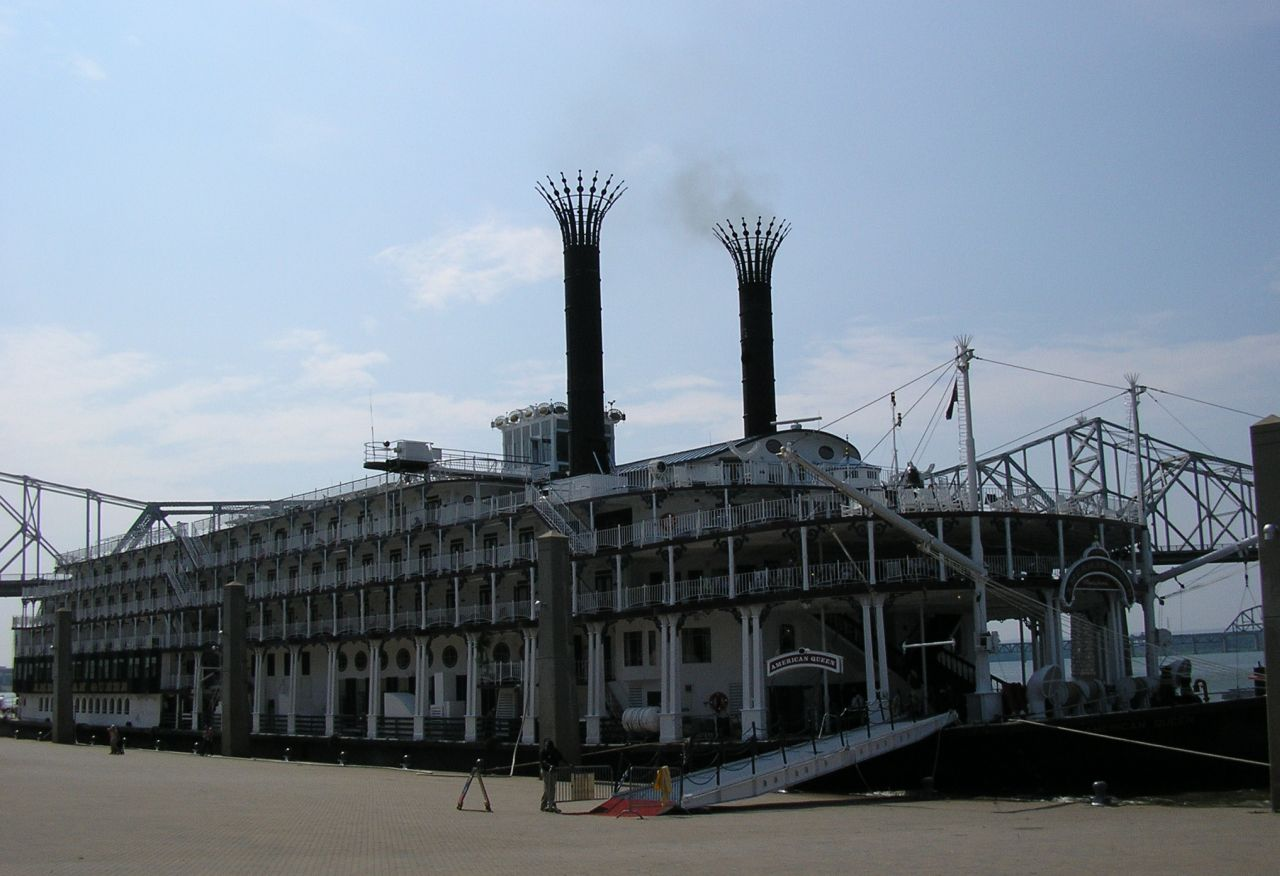
American Queen

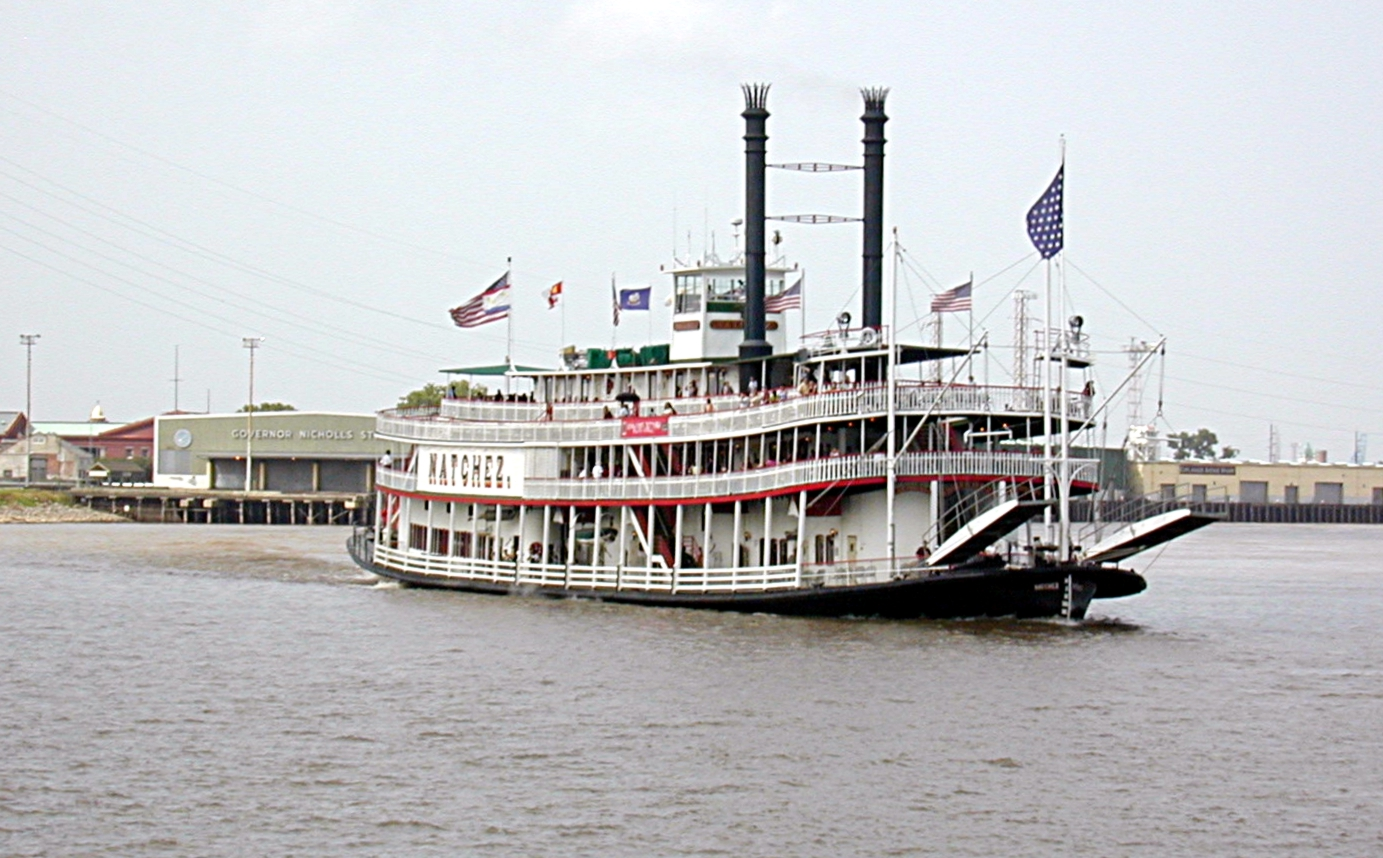
Natchez

The Delta King is in use as a floating restaurant/hotel in Old Town Sacramento, California

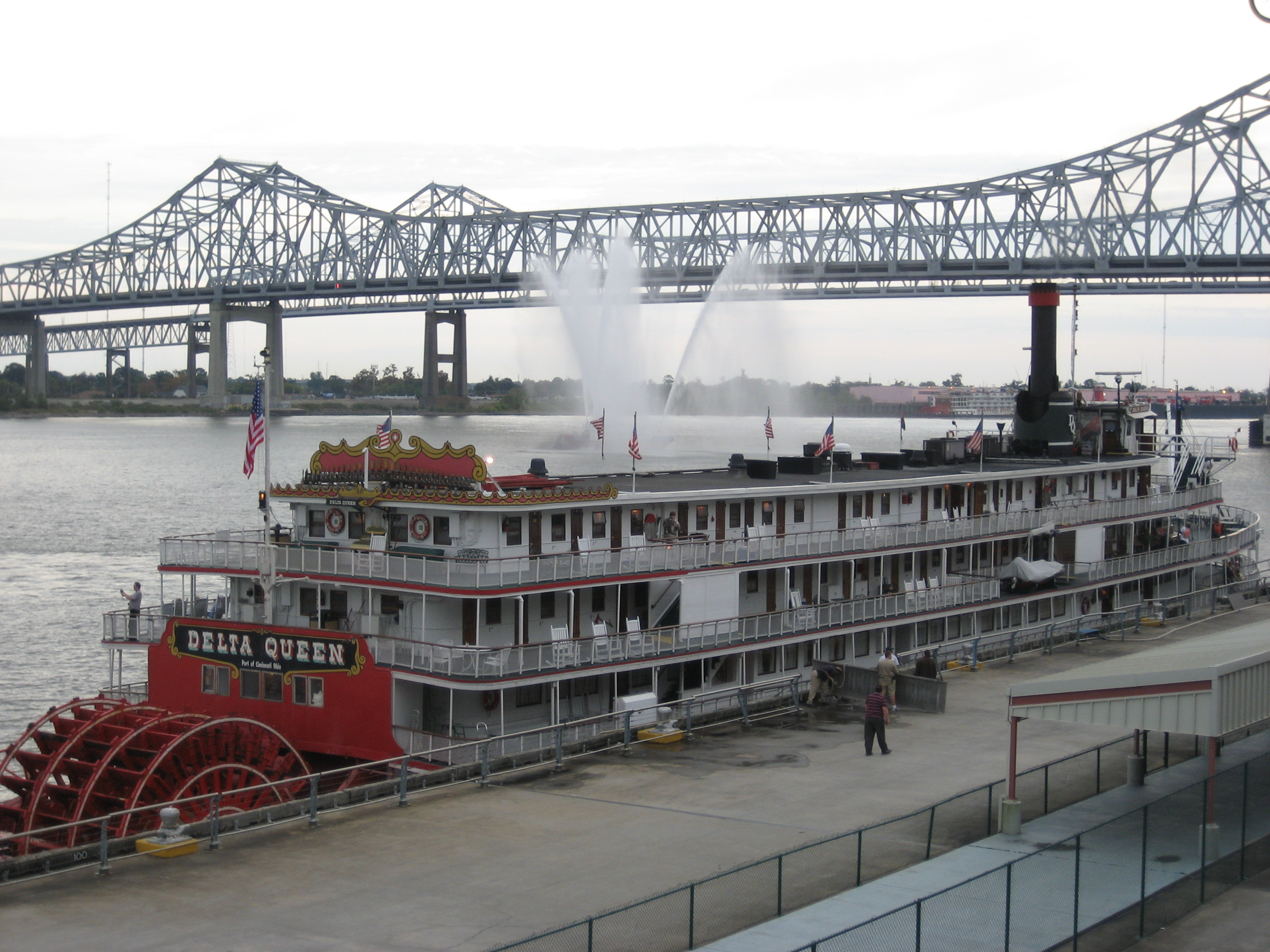
The Delta Queen is a sister boat to the Delta King.

Smaller luxury craft (without entertainment) operate on European waterways - both rivers and canals, with some providing bicycle and van side trips to smaller villages.

=== High-speed passenger transport ===
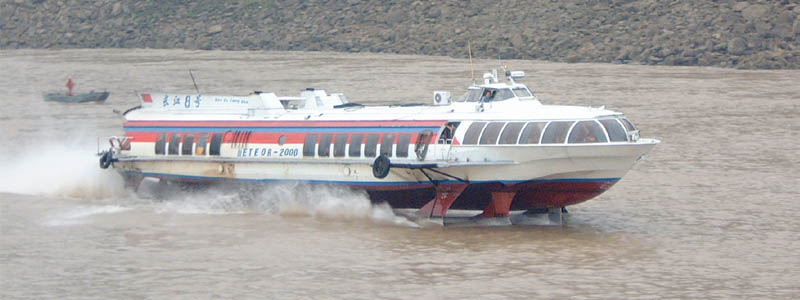
High-speed planing and hydrofoil riverboats

High-speed boats such as those shown here had a special advantage in some operations in the free-running Yangtze. In several locations within the Three Gorges, one-way travel was enforced through fast narrows. While less maneuverable and deeper draft vessels were obliged to wait for clearance, these high-speed boats were free to zip past waiting traffic by running in the shallows.

=== Local and low-cost passenger transport ===
Smaller riverboats are used in urban and suburban areas for sightseeing and public transport. Sightseeing boats can be found in Amsterdam, Paris, and other touristic cities where historical monuments are located near water.

The concept of local waterborn public transport is known as water taxi in English-speaking countries, vaporetto in Venice, water/river tramway in former Soviet Union and Poland (although sightseeing boats can be called water tramways too). Local waterborne public transport is similar to ferry.

The transport craft shown below is used for short-distance carriage of passengers between villages and small cities along the Yangtze, while larger craft are used for low-cost carriage over longer distance, without the fancy food or shows seen on the tourist riverboats. In some cases, the traveller must provide their own food.

Passenger Transport Ships

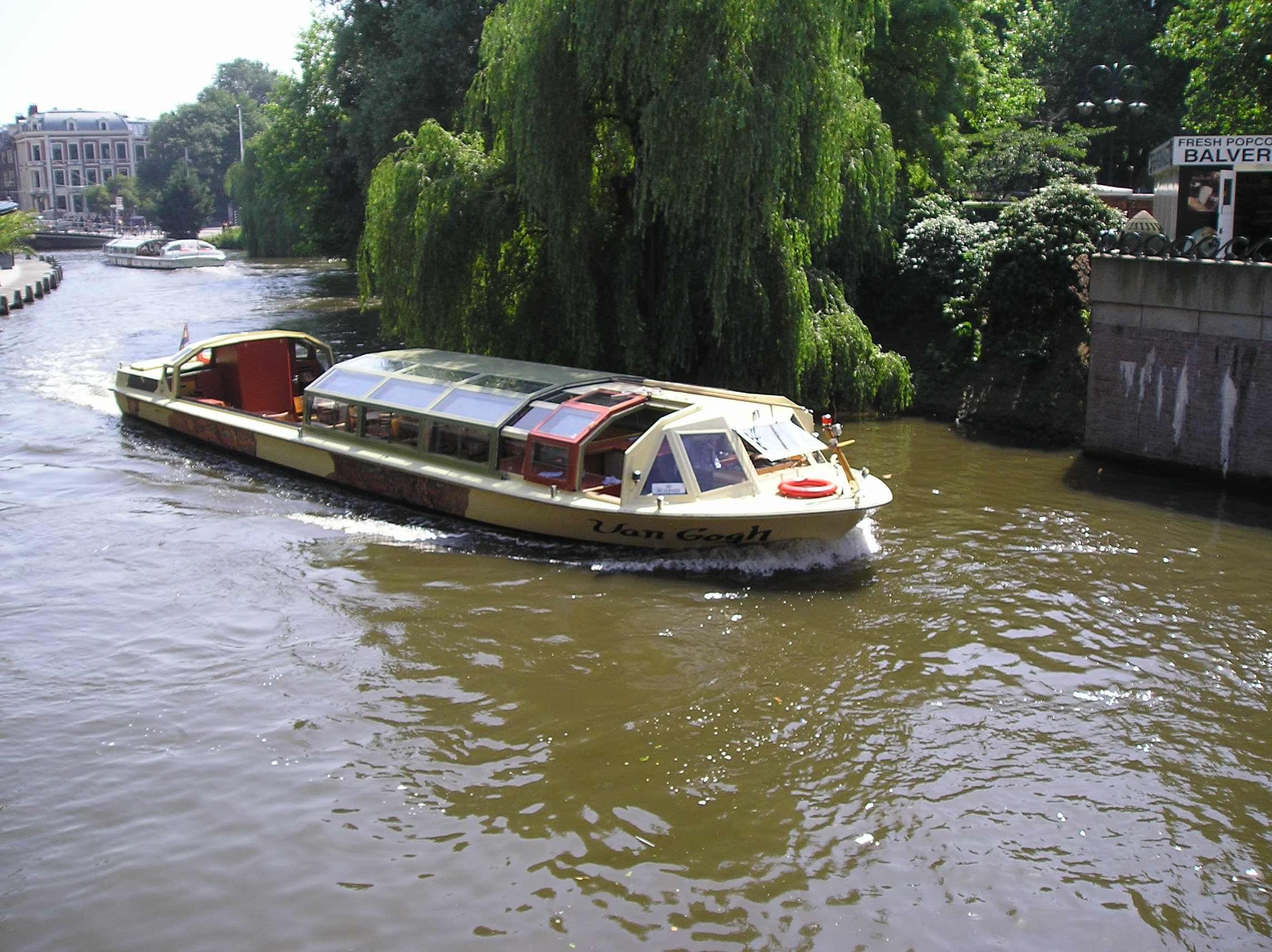
Sightseeing boat in Amsterdam

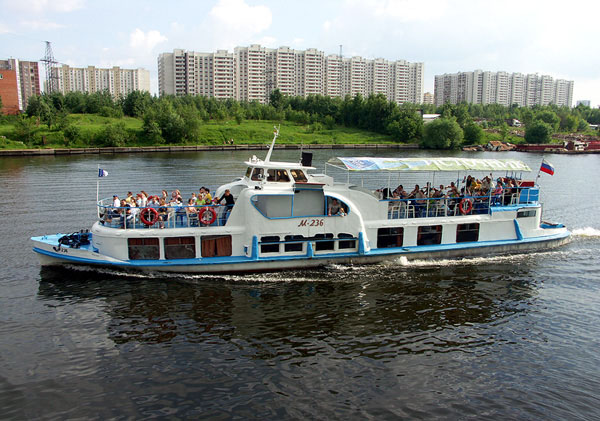
River tramway Moskvitch in Moscow

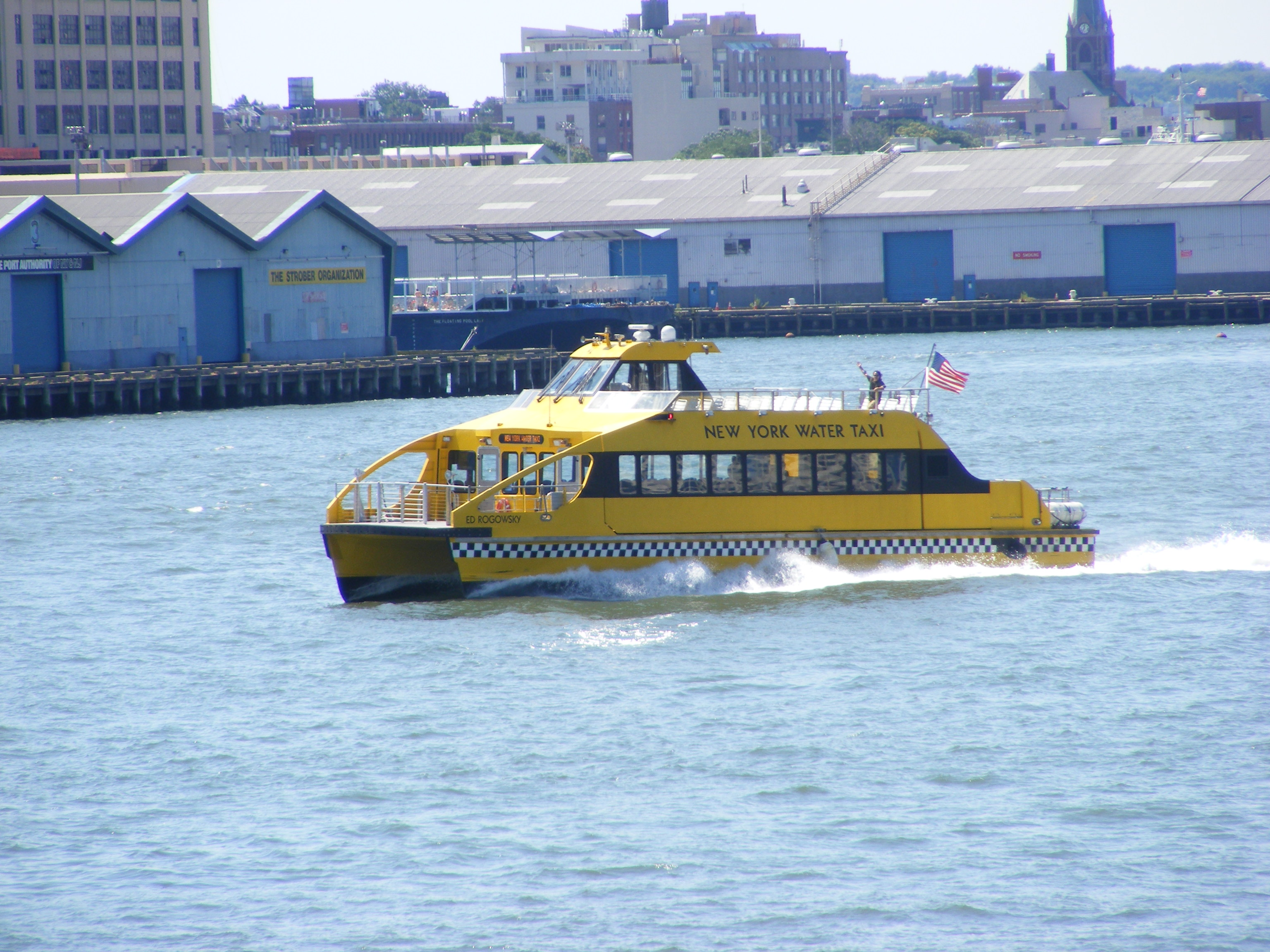
New York Water Taxi

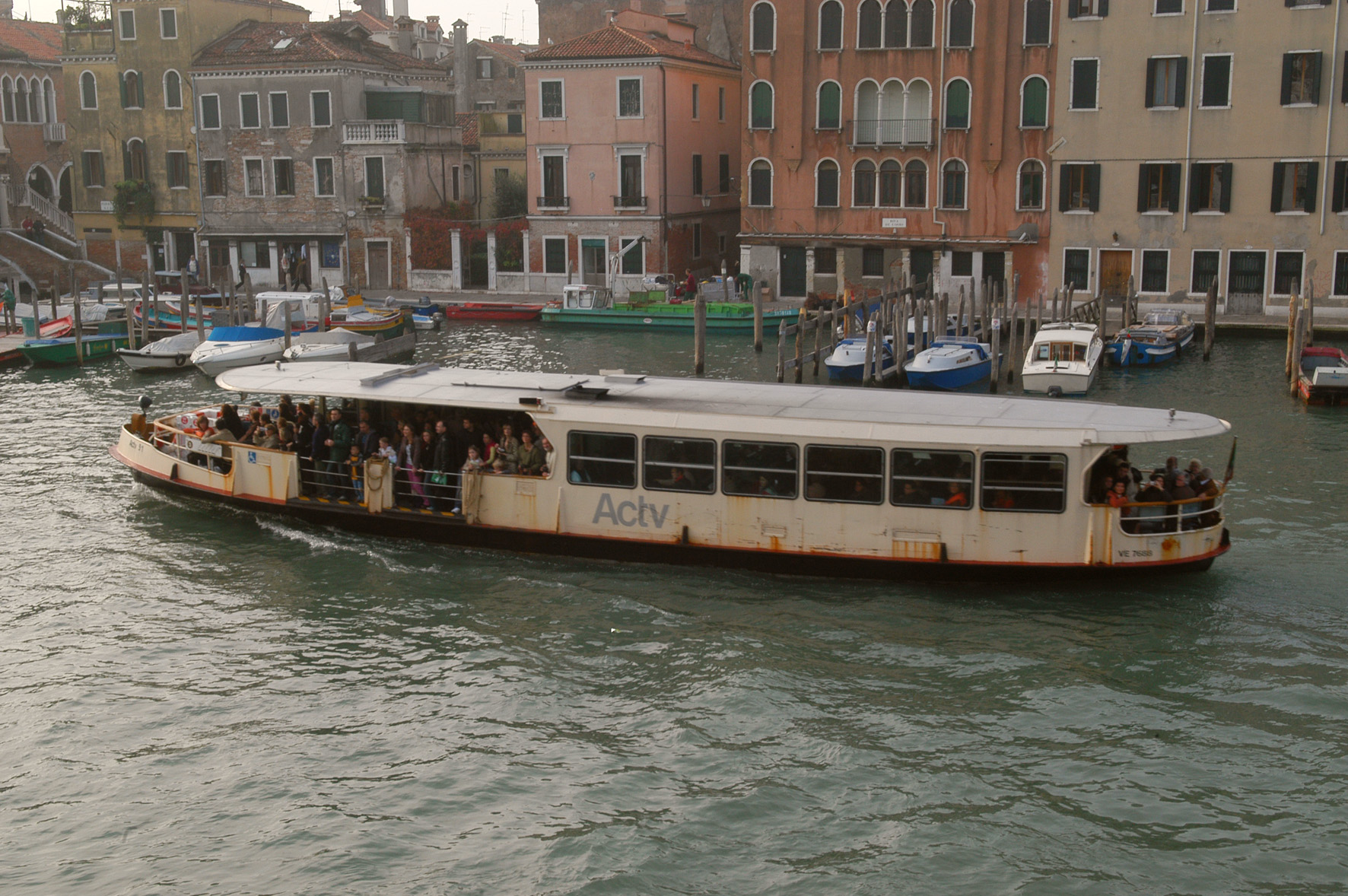
Vaporetto in Venice

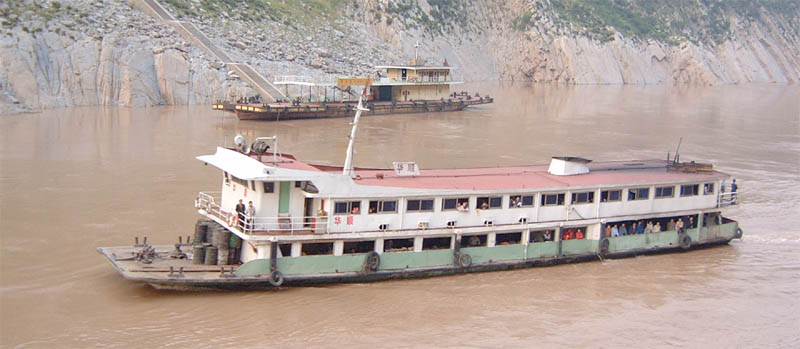
Low-cost transport in China

=== Goods transport ===
==== Multimodal ====
As the major rivers in China are mostly east–west, most rail and road transport are typically north–south. As roads along the rivers are inadequate for heavy truck transport and in some cases extremely dangerous, drive-on/drive-off ramp barges are used to transport trucks. In many cases the trucks transported are new and are being delivered to customers or dealers. Perhaps unique to China, the new trucks observed traveling upstream were all blue, while the new trucks traveling downstream were all white.

==== Bulk cargo ====
Low-value goods are transported on rivers and canals worldwide, since slow-speed barge traffic offers the lowest possible cost per ton mile and the capital cost per ton carried is also quite low compared to other modes of transport.

Cargo Ships

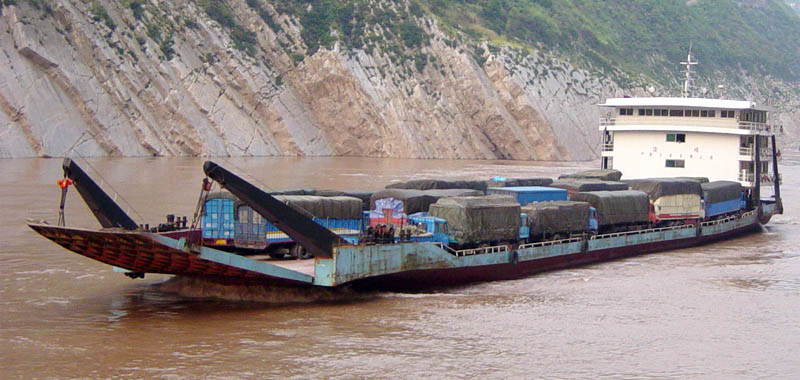
Cargo riverboat

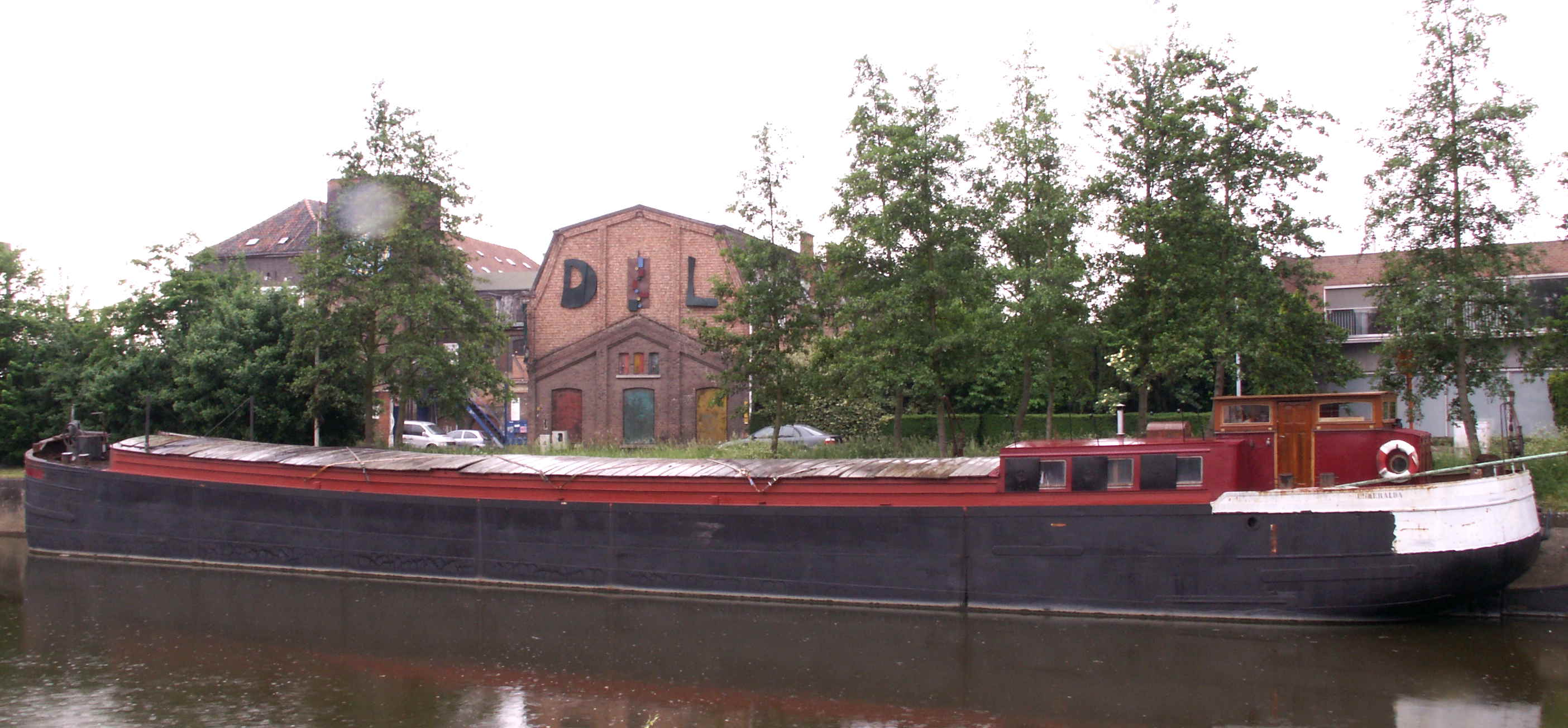
Riverboat used for bulk cargo transport

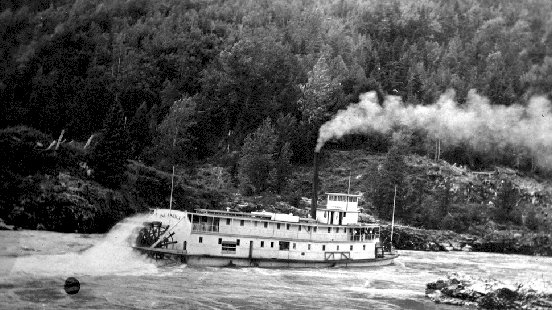
SS Inlander on the Skeena River at Kitselas Canyon, 1911

== See also ==
- Barge
- Chain boat
- Life on the Mississippi
- Ferryboat
- Fireboat
- Charles T. Hinde, a riverboat captain in the 1800s.
- Hydrofoil
- Keelboat
- List of steamboats on the Columbia River
- McKenzie River dory
- Murray-Darling steamboats
- Narrowboat
- P.A. Denny (ship)
- Paddle steamer
- River cruise
- Sampan
- Shitik
- Steamboat
- Steamboats of the Mississippi
- Steamboats of the Columbia River
- Steamboats of the upper Columbia and Kootenay Rivers
- Steamboats of the Willamette River
- Tourist sternwheelers of Oregon
- Towboat
- Tugboat
- Frederick Way Jr.
- Lewis and Clark's keelboat
