= USCGC Greenbrier (WAGL-214) =

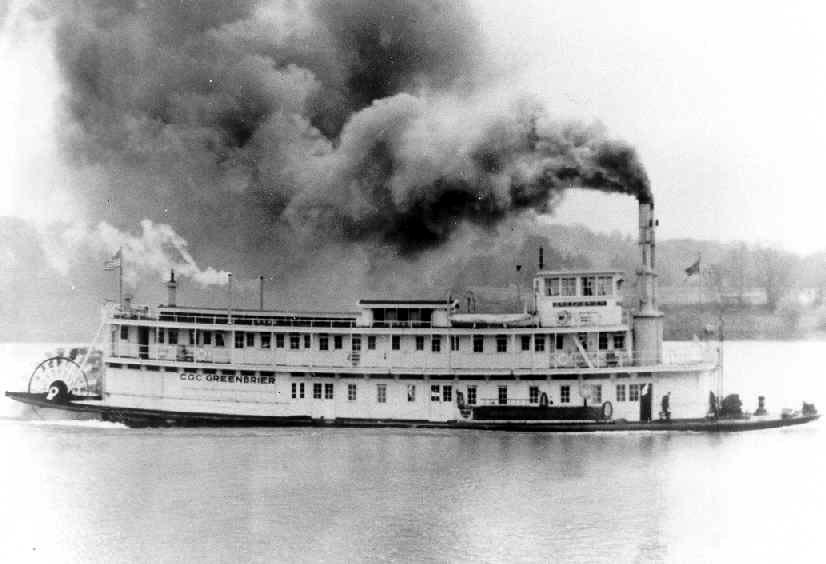

History

United States
- Name: USCGC Greenbrier
- Operator: United States Lighthouse Service (1924 - 1939); United States Coast Guard (1939 - 1947)
- Builder: Charles Ward Engineering Works, Charleston, West Virginia
- Commissioned: 20 June 1924 (US Lighthouse Service)
- Recommissioned: 1939 (US Coast Guard)
- Decommissioned: 19 September 1947
- Homeport: Cincinnati, Ohio
- Fate: Sold 19 April 1948

General characteristics
- Class & type: Stern paddlewheel steamer
- Displacement: 440 tons
- Length: 165 ft (50 m)
- Speed: 7 knots cruising; 10 knots maximum

The USCGC Greenbrier was a stern paddlewheel steamer that was used as a river tender, first by the United States Lighthouse Service and then by the United States Coast Guard.

The Greenbrier was built by Charles Ward Engineering Works of Charleston, West Virginia, with a steel hull topped by a composite superstructure. She entered service with the Lighthouse Service on 20 June 1924.

Her top speed was 10 knots, with an economic cruising speed of 7 knots. Five percent of her space was allotted to buoy tending equipment with the remaining space was made up of "hotel features." Greenbrier was based at Cincinnati, Ohio and serviced aids to navigation for 443 miles on the Ohio and Kanawha Rivers. She was transferred to the Coast Guard in 1939 along with the rest of the Lighthouse Service and remained in commission until 19 September 1947. She was then sold on 19 April 1948.
