= Gilbert Livingston (1690–1746) =

Lawyer and politician

Member of the New York General Assembly
- In office 1728–1738
- Preceded by: Robert Livingston
- Succeeded by: Robert Livingston

Personal details
- Born: Hubertus Livingston; April 3, 1690 Albany, Province of New York, British America
- Died: April 25, 1746 (aged 56) Kingston, Province of New York, British America
- Spouse: Cornelia Beekman (m. 1711; died 1742)
- Relations: Philip Livingston (brother); Robert Livingston (brother); Gilbert Livingston (grandson); John Henry Livingston (grandson); Henry Livingston Jr. (grandson); Philip Van Cortlandt (grandson); Pierre Van Cortlandt Jr. (grandson); Nicholas Stuyvesant (grandson); Peter Gerard Stuyvesant (grandson)
- Children: 13
- Parent(s): Robert Livingston the Elder; Alida Schuyler van Rensselaer Livingston

Lt.-Col. Hubertus "Gilbert" Livingston (April 3, 1690 – April 25, 1746) was a younger son of Robert Livingston the Elder who was a lawyer and politician in colonial New York.

== Early life ==
Livingston was born on April 3, 1690, in Albany in the Province of New York, a part of British America. He was a younger son of Alida (née Schuyler) Van Rensselaer Livingston and Robert Livingston the Elder, the first Lord of Livingston Manor who amassed one of the largest fortunes in 17th-century New York. Among his large immediate family were Johannes Livingston (who predeceased their father), Margaret (née Livingston) Vetch (wife of Samuel Vetch, the Royal Governor of Nova Scotia); Philip Livingston, 2nd Lord of Livingston Manor, Robert Livingston of Clermont, and Joanna Livingston (wife of Cornelius Gerrit Van Horne).

His father was born in Scotland before the family was exiled to Rotterdam, in the Dutch Republic; later sailing for North America where he became a prominent colonial official, fur trader, and businessman who was granted a patent to 160,000 acres (650 km^{2}/ 250 sq mi) along the Hudson River that was confirmed by royal charter of George I in 1715. His mother, the widow of Nicholas Van Rensselaer, was the daughter of Philip Pieterse Schuyler, vice-director of Fort Orange and sister of Pieter Schuyler, the mayor of Albany and acting Governor of the Province of New York. Pieter's daughter, his maternal cousin Margarita Schuyler, married his paternal cousin, Robert Livingston the Younger.

== Career ==
Livingston's parents sent him to study with the Rev. Solomon Stoddard, the pastor of the Congregationalist Church in Northampton, Massachusetts Bay Colony. However, Gilbert chose a career in trade, becoming a surveyor and then a merchant. His father helped him by employing him as his surveyor and then as his commercial agent.

In 1717, his father helped him and his business partner, Francis Harison (later Recorder of New York City), to purchase "the farm of the New York City liquor excise." In 1720, his father convinced Governor William Burnet to appoint Gilbert to the positions of registrar of the Court of Chancery, the highest court in New York, and county clerk of Ulster, where they lived off his wife's inheritance. By 1721, however, Livingston and Harison were not able to pay the British government what they owed from the customs farm, so he was forced to sell some of his wife's inherited property and seek his father's help. The elder Livingston paid his debts and successfully sought the assistance of Governor Burnet to extricate Gilbert from his financial issues.

When his brother inherited the Manor in 1728, Gilbert gave up trade and took over Robert's seat representing the Manor in the New York General Assembly, serving until 1738, when he was succeeded by his nephew, Robert Livingston, later the 3rd Lord of Livingston Manor.

=== Inheritance ===
His elder brother Philip inherited six slaves, the lot and family house in Albany and the bulk of Livingston Manor becoming 2nd Lord of the Manor, and another elder brother, Robert, inherited three slaves and about 13,000 acres which became known as Clermont.

His father intended Gilbert to inherit his Saratoga property and a house in Albany, however due to his "arrogance" and irresponsibility, his father sold half the Saratoga holdings to cover Gilbert's losses as a merchant and added a codicil to his will in 1722 which divided the remainder of the Saratoga property, and the income from the house in Albany, in fifths to all of his children with Gilbert's share in trusteeship under his brother Philip. Gilbert did inherit his father's Canastoga farm and a "slave boy" named Jupiter.

== Personal life ==
In 1711, Livingston was married to Cornelia Beekman (1693–1742), a daughter of Joanna (née Lopers) Beekman and Hendrick Beekman, a large landowner, Colonel of Militia, and member of the New York General Assembly for over 40 years. She was a granddaughter of Wilhelmus Beekman, the former Mayor of New York, and a niece of Gerardus Beekman. Cornelia's niece, Margaret Beekman (the only child of her brother Henry Beekman), married Gilbert's nephew Robert Livingston (the only child of Robert Livingston of Clermont). Together, Cornelia and Gilbert were the parents of fourteen children, including:

- Robert Gilbert Livingston (1712–1789), a successful merchant and Maj. with the Continental Army during the Revolutionary War who married Catharina McPheadres (1722–1792), a daughter of John McPheadris, in 1740.
- Henry Gilbert Livingston (1714–1799), a member of the New York General Assembly from Dutchess County who married Susannah Storm Conklin (1724–1793), a daughter of Capt. John Conklin, in 1741. He became the protégé of his sonless uncle Henry Beekman.
- Alida Livingston (1716–1798), who married Jacob Rutsen (1716–1753) in 1737 (grandparents of Jacob R. Van Rensselaer); after his death she married Hendrick Van Rensselaer (1712–1793), the widower of Elizabeth Van Brugh and a younger son of Hendrick van Rensselaer (director of the Eastern patent of the Rensselaerswyck), in 1762.
- Gilbert Livingston Jr. (1718–1789), a shipmaster who fled New York in 1743; he married Joy Darrell in 1748, and served with the Continental Army during the Revolutionary War.
- Johannes "John" Livingston (1720–c. 1739), a soldier who died unmarried.
- Joanna Livingston (1722–1808), who married her second cousin Pierre Van Cortlandt (1721–1814), the first Lieutenant Governor of the New York, in 1748.
- William Livingston (1724–1730), who died in childhood.
- Philip Livingston (1726–1751), who moved to Curaçao where he died unmarried.
- James Livingston (1728–1790), who had a 115-acre farm in Dutchess County and married Judith Newcomb (1733–1808), a daughter of Thomas Newcomb, in 1751.
- Samuel Livingston (1730–c. 1756), a shipmaster who died at sea near Sulawesi Tengah in Indonesia.
- Cornelius Livingston (1732–1748), a shipmaster who died unmarried.
- Catherine Livingston (1734–1769), who married Jonathan Thorne (1724–1777), a son of Samuel Thorne, in 1751.
- Margaret "Peggy" Livingston (1738–1818), who married Peter Stuyvesant, a great-grandson of Petrus Stuyvesant, the last Dutch Director-General of New Amsterdam, in 1764.

His wife died in 1742. Livingston died on April 25, 1746, in Kingston and was buried at what is known as the Old Dutch Churchyard there.

=== Descendants ===
Through his son Henry, he was a grandfather of prominent legislator Gilbert Livingston, the Rev. John Henry Livingston (who served as 4th President of Rutgers University and was father of New York State Senator Henry A. Livingston), and the soldier and poet Henry Livingston Jr. (sometimes claimed to be the uncredited author of the poem A Visit from St. Nicholas).

Through his daughter Joanna, he was a grandfather of Brig.-Gen. and U.S. Representative Philip Van Cortlandt (1749–1831); Catherine Van Cortlandt (1751–1829) (wife of Abraham Van Wyck); Cornelia Van Cortlandt (1753–1847) (wife of Gerard G. Beekman, Jr.); Gilbert Livingston Van Cortlandt (1757–1786); Pierre Van Cortlandt Jr. (1762–1848), and Anne de Peyster Van Cortlandt (wife of Albany mayor Philip S. Van Rensselaer).

Through his youngest daughter Peggy, he was a grandfather of Judith Stuyvesant (1765–1844) (wife of Benjamin Winthrop; grandparents of U.S. Representative John Winthrop Chanler); Cornelia Stuyvesant (1768–1825) (wife of Speaker of the New York State Assembly Dirck Ten Broeck); Nicholas William Stuyvesant (1769–1833); Elizabeth Stuyvesant (1775–1854) (wife of Adjutant General of New York Nicholas Fish); and Peter Gerard Stuyvesant (1778–1847).
