= Henry Gilbert Livingston =

American doctor and politician

- portrait by John Mare

Member of the New York General Assembly for Dutchess County
- In office 1754–1768
- Succeeded by: Leonard Van Kleeck

Personal details
- Born: August 27, 1714 Kingston, Province of New York, British America
- Died: February 10, 1799 (aged 74) Poughkeepsie, New York, U.S.
- Spouse: Susannah Storm Conklin (m. 1742; died 1793)
- Relations: See Livingston family
- Parent(s): Cornelia Beekman Livingston; Gilbert Livingston

Henry Gilbert Livingston (August 27, 1714 – February 10, 1799) was an American medical doctor and politician from New York state.

== Early life ==
Livingston was born on August 27, 1714, in Kingston in the Province of New York, a part of British America. He was the second son of fourteen children born to Cornelia (née Beekman) Livingston (1693–1742) and Gilbert Livingston (1690–1746), a lawyer and politician in colonial New York. Among his siblings were the Loyalist merchant Robert Gilbert Livingston, Alida Livingston (wife of Jacob Rutsen and Hendrick van Rensselaer), Joanna Livingston (wife of Pierre Van Cortlandt), Margaret Livingston (wife of Peter Stuyvesant).

His maternal grandparents were Joanna (née Lopers) Beekman and Hendrick Beekman, a large landowner, Colonel of Militia, and member of the New York General Assembly for over 40 years. His father was a younger son of Alida (née Schuyler) Van Rensselaer Livingston and Robert Livingston the Elder, the first Lord of Livingston Manor, who amassed one of the largest fortunes in 17th-century New York.

== Career ==
Livingston's estate at Poughkeepsie.

Livingston moved to Poughkeepsie, New York, where he was granted the clerkship of Dutchess County, serving from 1742 to 1789. From 1754 to 1768, he was a member of the New York General Assembly representing the County of Dutchess.

== Personal life ==
In 1742, Livingston was married to Susannah Storm Conklin (1724–1793), a daughter of Captain John Conklin and Joanna (née Storm) Conklin. They reportedly met when Livingston moved from Kingston to Poughkeepsie and while renting a house from Capt. Conklin, met and fell in love with his daughter Susannah. Together, they were the parents of:

- Gilbert Livingston (1742–1806), who married Catherine Crannell (1745–1830) in 1763.
- John Henry Livingston (1746–1825), who married his second cousin Sarah Livingston (1752–1814), daughter of Philip Livingston, in 1775.
- Henry Livingston Jr. (1748–1828), who married Sarah Welles, a daughter of Rev. Noah Welles, and, after her death, Jane McLean Patterson (1769–1838), a daughter of Matthew Patterson.
- Cornelia Livingston (1750–1810), who married Myndert Van Kleeck (1744–1799)
- Catherine Elizabeth Livingston (1751–1828), who married Thomas Mifflin and, after his 1800 death, Peter Close Sr. (b. 1751).
- Joanna Livingston (1754–1795), who married Paul Schenck (1741–1817).
- Susan Livingston (1755–1781), who married Gerardus Duyckinck (1754–1814).
- Alida Livingston Woolsey (1758–1843), who married Melancthon Lloyd Woolsey (1754–1819) in 1779.
- Robert Henry Livingston (1760–1804), who married Catherine "Cady" Tappan (1772–1841).
- Beekman Livingston (1762–1842), who married Catherine Marsh (1772–1854).
- Helena Livingston (1767–1859), who married New York Supreme Court Justice Jonas Platt, son of Zephaniah Platt, founder of Plattsburgh, New York.

Livingston died on February 10, 1799, in Poughkeepsie, New York, where he was an Elder and Deacon of the Reformed Dutch Church of Poughkeepsie. The administrators of his will were Thomas Mitchell, Theodorus Bailey and John Mott.

=== Descendants ===
Through his eldest son Gilbert, he was a grandfather of Sarah Livingston (1777–1833), who married Smith Thompson, the 6th Secretary of the Navy who was appointed as an Associate Justice of the Supreme Court of the United States by President James Monroe.

Through his second son John, he was a grandfather of Henry Alexander Livingston (1776–1849), a member of the New York State Senate who married twice and had eighteen children.

Through his daughter Alida, he was a grandfather of Melancthon Taylor Woolsey (1782–1838), an officer in the U.S. Navy during the War of 1812 and battles on the Great Lakes.

Through his youngest daughter Helena, he was a grandfather of Zephaniah Platt (1796–1871), the Attorney General of Michigan.
