= Henry Beekman =

American politician and landowner

Member of the New York General Assembly for Dutchess County
- In office 1725–1759

Personal details
- Born: January 4, 1687 Kingston, Province of New York, British America
- Died: January 3, 1775 (aged 87) Rhinebeck, New York
- Spouse(s): Janet Livingston (died 1724) Gertrude Van Cortlandt (m. 1726)
- Relations: Wilhelmus Beekman (grandfather); Gerardus Beekman (uncle); Robert R. Livingston (grandson); Gertrude Livingston Lewis (granddaughter); Edward Livingston (grandson)
- Children: Margaret Beekman
- Parent(s): Hendrick Beekman; Johanna de Loper Davidson Beekman

Henry Beekman (January 4, 1687 – January 3, 1775) was a politician and landowner from the Thirteen Colonies.

== Early life ==
Beekman was born in Kingston, New York. the son of Judge Hendrick "Henry" Beekman (1652–1716) and his wife, Johanna (née de Loper) Davidson Beekman. His mother was the widow of Joris Davidson. His father served as a justice of the peace for Ulster County. His sister was Cornelia Beekman, who married Gilbert Livingston, a son of Robert Livingston, first Lord of Livingston Manor. Through his sister Cornelia, he was uncle to Margaret and Joanna Livingston. Margaret married Peter Stuyvesant, a great-grandson of the Peter Stuyvesant (who was the last Dutch director-general of New Netherland) and Joanna married Pierre Van Cortlandt, the first lieutenant governor of the New York.

His paternal grandparents were Catalina (née de Boogh) Beekman and Wilhelmus Beekman, who served as the governor of the Colony of Swedes and acting mayor of New York City from 1682 to 1683 under Governor Anthony Brockholls. His uncle Gerardus Beekman was elected president of the council and acting governor of the Province of New York in 1710. His maternal grandparents were Captain Jacob de Loper and Cornelia Melyn (a daughter of Cornelius Melyn, Patroon of Staten Island).

== Career ==
From his father, Beekman inherited the large Beekman estate consisting of two large tracts of land in Dutchess County in the Province of New York. One in the area of Rhinebeck, New York and the other, called the "Back Lots" or Beekman Patent, in the south east corner of Dutchess County. From 1725 to 1759, he represented Dutchess County in the New York General Assembly.

== Personal life ==
Beekman was twice married. His first wife was Janet Livingston (1703–1724), a daughter of Robert Livingston the Younger. Together, they were the parents of:

- Margaret Beekman (1724–1800), who married Robert Livingston, a cousin of Gilbert and the only child of Robert Livingston of Clermont.

After his first wife's death in 1724, he married Gertrude van Cortlandt (1682–1777) in 1726. Gertrude was a daughter of Stephanus Van Cortlandt, the 10th and 17th Mayor of New York City.

Beekman died in Rhinebeck, New York on January 3, 1775. His widow died two years later on March 23, 1777.

=== Descendants ===
Through his daughter Margaret, he was a grandfather of Robert R. Livingston, the Chancellor of New York; Janet Livingston (wife of Gen. Richard Montgomery); Margaret Livingston (wife of Thomas Tillotson, an army surgeon who became New York Secretary of State); Henry Beekman Livingston, who commanded the 4th New York Regiment at the Battles of Saratoga and Monmouth and during the winter at Valley Forge and married Ann Hume Shippen, daughter of Prof. Dr. William Shippen; Catharine Livingston (who married Freeborn Garrettson); John R. Livingston, a merchant who married Margaret Sheafe and, after her death, Eliza McEvers; Gertrude Livingston (wife of Gov. Morgan Lewis); Joanna Livingston (wife of Peter R. Livingston, acting Lieutenant Governor of New York); Alida Livingston (wife of John Armstrong Jr., a U.S. Senator, U.S. Secretary of War, and U.S. Minister to France); and Edward Livingston, a U.S. Senator and U.S. Secretary of State who married Mary McEvers, the sister of Auguste Davezac.
