= Robert Gilbert Livingston =

American merchant during the American Revolutionary War

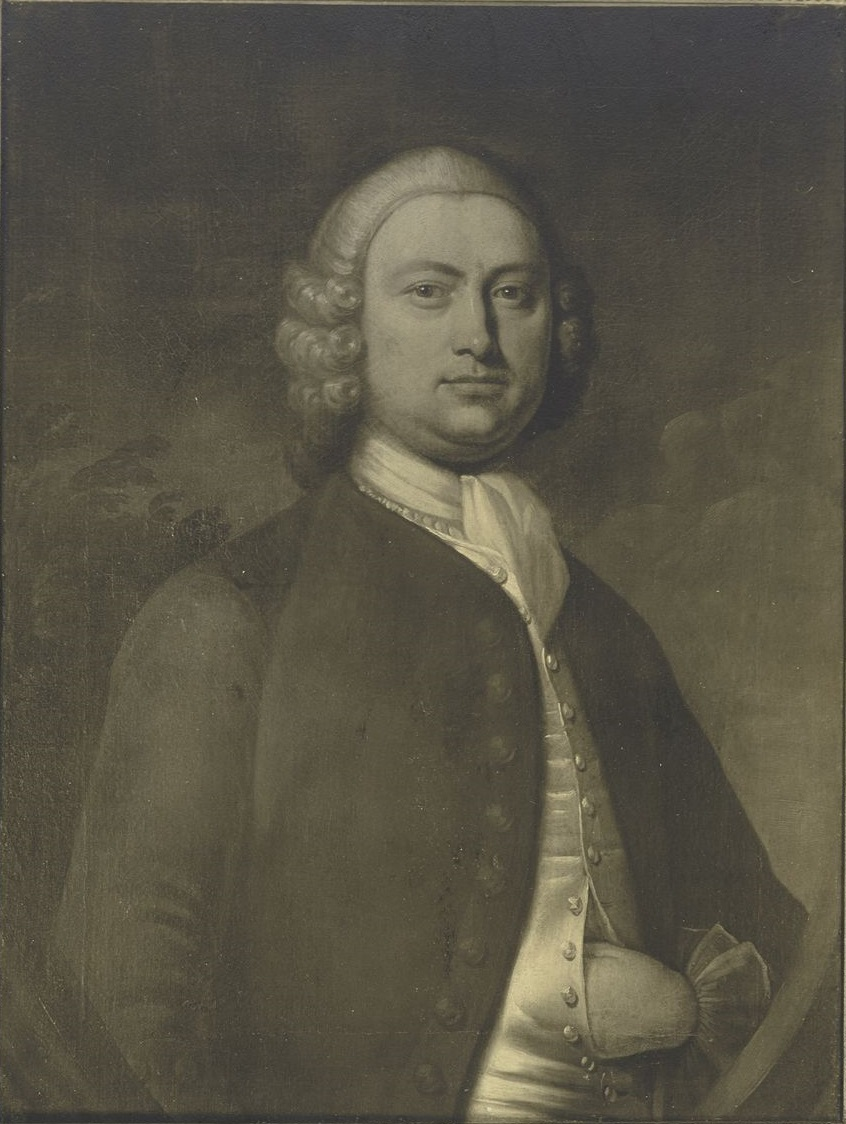
- Portrait of Robert Gilbert Livingston by John Mare
- Born: December 24, 1712; Kingston, Province of New York, British America
- Died: August 27, 1789 (aged 76); Poughkeepsie, New York, U.S.
- Occupation: Merchant
- Spouse: Catharina McPheadres (after 1740)
- Parent(s): Cornelia Beekman Livingston; Gilbert Livingston
- Relatives: See Livingston family

Maj. Robert Gilbert Livingston (December 24, 1712 – August 27, 1789) was an American merchant and a Loyalist during the American Revolutionary War.

== Early life ==
Livingston was born on December 24, 1712, in Kingston in the Province of New York, a part of British America. He was the eldest of fourteen children born to Cornelia (née Beekman) Livingston (1693–1742) and Gilbert Livingston (1690–1746), a lawyer and politician in colonial New York. Among his siblings were Alida Livingston (wife of Jacob Rutsen and Hendrick van Rensselaer), Joanna Livingston (wife of Pierre Van Cortlandt), Margaret Livingston (wife of Peter Stuyvesant).

His maternal grandparents were Joanna (née Lopers) Beekman and Hendrick Beekman, a large landowner, Colonel of Militia, and member of the New York General Assembly for over 40 years. His father was a younger son of Alida (née Schuyler) Van Rensselaer Livingston and Robert Livingston the Elder, the first Lord of Livingston Manor, who amassed one of the largest fortunes in 17th-century New York.

== Career ==
During the American Revolutionary War, Livingston was a prominent Loyalist who fought with the British Army, reaching the rank of Major.

Livingston was a successful merchant and had a shop next to Samuel Hake, his son-in-law who was a wholesale merchant.

== Personal life ==
In 1740, Livingston was married to Catharina McPheadres (1722–1792), a daughter of John McPheadris and Helena (née Johnson) McPheadris. Together, they were the parents of:

- Robert Gilbert Livingston Jr. (1749–1791), who married Margaret Hude (1751–1824).
- Helen Livingston (1751–1791), who married Samuel Hake, Commissary General of the British Army in North America.
- Catherine Livingston (1756–1829), who married John Reade (1745–1808).
- Gilbert Robert Livingston (1758–1816), who married Martha De Lancey Kane (1758–1843).
- Henry Gilbert Livingston (1758–1817), who married Ann Nutter.
- Simon Johnson Livingston (b. 1762)

Livingston died on August 27, 1789, in Poughkeepsie, New York "after a tedious illness at an advanced age". His widow died on August 5, 1792, also in Poughkeepsie.

=== Descendants ===
Through his daughter Catherine, he was a grandfather of Catherine Livingston Reade (1777–1863), who married her cousin Nicholas William Stuyvesant, a great-great-grandson of Peter Stuyvesant, the last Dutch Director-General of New Amsterdam.

Through his daughter Helen, he was a grandfather of Helen Livingston Hake (1773–1807), who married Frederic de Peyster and was the mother of New York City lawyer Frederic de Peyster. Livingston left an extensive estate, including three farms in Otsego County, New York and extensive lands in Duchess County, New York, to his granddaughter Helen.

Through his son Gilbert Robert, he was a great-grandfather of Gilbert Livingston Beeckman, a prominent New York merchant who was the father of Robert Livingston Beeckman, who served as the Governor of Rhode Island.
