= William Starbuck Mayo =

American novelist

Dr. William Starbuck Mayo (April 15, 1811 – November 22, 1895) was an American physician and writer who created the fantasy worlds "Kaloola" and "Framazugda".

== Early life ==
Mayo was born in Ogdensburg, New York on April 15, 1811. He was the son of Obed Mayo, a shipbuilder, and Elizabeth (née Starbuck) Mayo. On his father's side, he was descended from the Rev. John Mayo, the first minister of the North Church in Boston. On his mother's side, he was descended from the Nantucket whaling and merchant Starbuck family.

== Career ==
Mayo attended an academy in Potsdam and after choosing a career in medicine, he studied under two local physicians before attending the College of Physicians and Surgeons in New York (today a part of Columbia University). After completing his medical studies in 1832, he practiced for a few years in Ogdensburg, but due to ill health, he left America to take a tour of Spain and the Barbary Coast of North Africa. His subsequent work as an author was largely based on these travel experiences. Mayo returned to America, relocated his medical practice to New York City, and began to write professionally.

== Personal life ==
In 1851, Mayo was married to Helen Cornelia (née Stuyvesant) Dudley Olmsted (1808–1890). By the time of their marriage, Helen was a widow of Henry Dudley and Francis Olmsted. She was the daughter of Nicholas William Stuyvesant (and a descendant of Peter Stuyvesant, the last Dutch Director-General of New Netherland) and the former Catherine Livingston Reade, a descendant of Gilbert Livingston and Robert Livingston the Elder, the first Lord of Livingston Manor. Helen and William had no children together.

He died in New York on November 22, 1895. His funeral was held at St. Mark's Church in-the-Bowery in Manhattan.

== Bibliography ==
- Kaloolah, or, Journeyings to the Djébel Kumri: an autobiography of Jonathan Romer. New York, G. P. Putnam; London, D. Bogue, 1849. LCCN 42-29446
- Berber; or, The mountaineer of the Atlas. A tale of Morocco. New York : G. P. Putnam; [etc., etc.], 1850. LCCN 07-18480
- Romance dust from the historic placer. New York, G. P. Putnam; [etc., etc.] 1851. LCCN 07-18478
- Flood and field Philadelphia, W. P. Hazard, 1855. LCCN 07-18479
- To the Hon. Gideon Welles, Secretary of the Navy. [New York? : s.n., 1862] LCCN 97-111722
- Never again New York, G.P. Putnam & sons, 1873. LCCN 44-43265
