= Hendrick Beekman =

American politician

Colonel Henry Beekman

Member of the New York General Assembly
- In office 1702–1716
- Preceded by: Jacob Rutsen
- Succeeded by: Abraham G. Chambers
- In office 1695–1698
- Preceded by: Thomas Garton
- Succeeded by: Jacob Rutsen
- In office 1691–1693
- Preceded by: Thomas Garton
- Succeeded by: Thomas Garton

Personal details
- Born: Hendrick Beekman; March 9, 1652 Kingston, New Netherland
- Died: 1716 (aged 63–64) Esopus, Province of New York, British America
- Spouse: Johanna de Loper Davidson (m. 1681)
- Relations: Gerardus Beekman (brother)
- Children: Henry Beekman; Cornelia Beekman Livingston
- Parent(s): Wilhelmus Beekman; Catalina de Boogh

Col. Hendrick "Henry" Beekman JP (March 9, 1652 – 1716), was a colonial American judge and politician.

== Early life ==
Beekman was born on March 9, 1652, in Kingston. He was the eldest son of the former Catalina de Boogh and Wilhelmus Beekman. His father was a Dutch immigrant who came to New Amsterdam from the Netherlands on the same vessel as Peter Stuyvesant and soon became Treasurer of the Dutch West India Company and later became the Mayor of New York City, Governor of Delaware from 1653 to 1664, and Governor of Pennsylvania from 1658 to 1663.

Among Henry's siblings were sister Maria Beekman (wife of Nicholas William Stuyvesant, son of Governor Peter Stuyvesant); Gerardus Beekman, a wealthy physician and land owner who served as president of the council and acting governor of the Province of New York in 1710; Cornelia Beekman (wife of Isaac Van Vleck); and Johannes Beekman (who married Aeltje Thomas Popinga).

== Career ==
In June 1682, Beekman received the deed of Esopus Indians. In 1703, he received the patent to Marbletown, New York, along with Capt. Thomas Garton and Capt. Charles Brodhead for the freeholders of Marbletown.

On January 25, 1684, Beekman was appointed Justice of the Peace for Ulster County by the Governor and Council. He also served as a Colonel of Militia.

From 1691 to 1693, again from 1695 to 1698, and lastly, from 1702 until his death in 1716, he represented Ulster in the New York General Assembly. From 1691 to 1693, he concurrently represented Westchester and Dutchess in the Assembly.

== Personal life ==
On June 5, 1681, Beekman was married to Jannetje "Johanna" (née de Loper) Davidson (1650–1743), a daughter of Captain Jacob de Loper of Stockholm and Cornelia (née Melyn) de Loper, and the widow of Joris Davidson. Her maternal grandfather was Cornelius Melyn, Patroon of Staten Island. Together, they were the parents of:

- Wilhelmus "William" Beekman (1682–1700), who died unmarried in the Netherlands.
- Catryntie "Catharine" Beekman (1683–1745), who married Cornelius Exveen; Johannes "John" Rutsen and Albert Pawling.
- Henry Beekman (1687–1775), who married Janet Livingston (1703–1724), a daughter of Robert Livingston the Younger. After her death in 1724, he married Gertrude van Cortlandt (1682–1777), a daughter of New York City mayor Stephanus Van Cortlandt, in 1726. Henry was the recipient of two large tracts of land in Dutchess County, one near Rhinebeck and the other, called the Back Lots or Beekman Patent, in the Southeast corner of Dutchess County.
- Cornelia Beekman (1693–1742), who married Gilbert Livingston, a younger son of Alida Schuyler and Robert Livingston the Elder, 1st Lord of Livingston Manor.

Beekman died in Esopus in 1716. His widow lived until December 1743.

=== Descendants ===
Through his son Henry, he was a grandfather of Margaret Beekman (1724–1800), the wife of Judge Robert Livingston of Clermont Manor. They were the parents of many children, including the Chancellor of New York Robert R. Livingston; Janet Livingston (wife of Gen. Richard Montgomery); Margaret Livingston (wife of New York Secretary of State Thomas Tillotson); Henry Beekman Livingston; Catharine Livingston (wife of Freeborn Garrettson); John R. Livingston; Gertrude Livingston (wife of Gov. Morgan Lewis); Joanna Livingston (wife of Peter R. Livingston, acting Lieutenant Governor of New York); Alida Livingston (wife of U.S. Senator, U.S. Secretary of War, and U.S. Minister to France John Armstrong Jr.), and Edward Livingston, a U.S. Senator and U.S. Secretary of State.

Through his daughter Cornelia, he was grandfather to thirteen, including Margaret Livingston (wife of Peter Stuyvesant, a great-grandson of the Peter Stuyvesant the last Dutch Director-General of New Netherland), and Joanna Livingston (wife of Pierre Van Cortlandt, the first Lieutenant Governor of the New York).
