= Peter Stuyvesant (merchant) =

New York landowner and merchant (1727–1805)

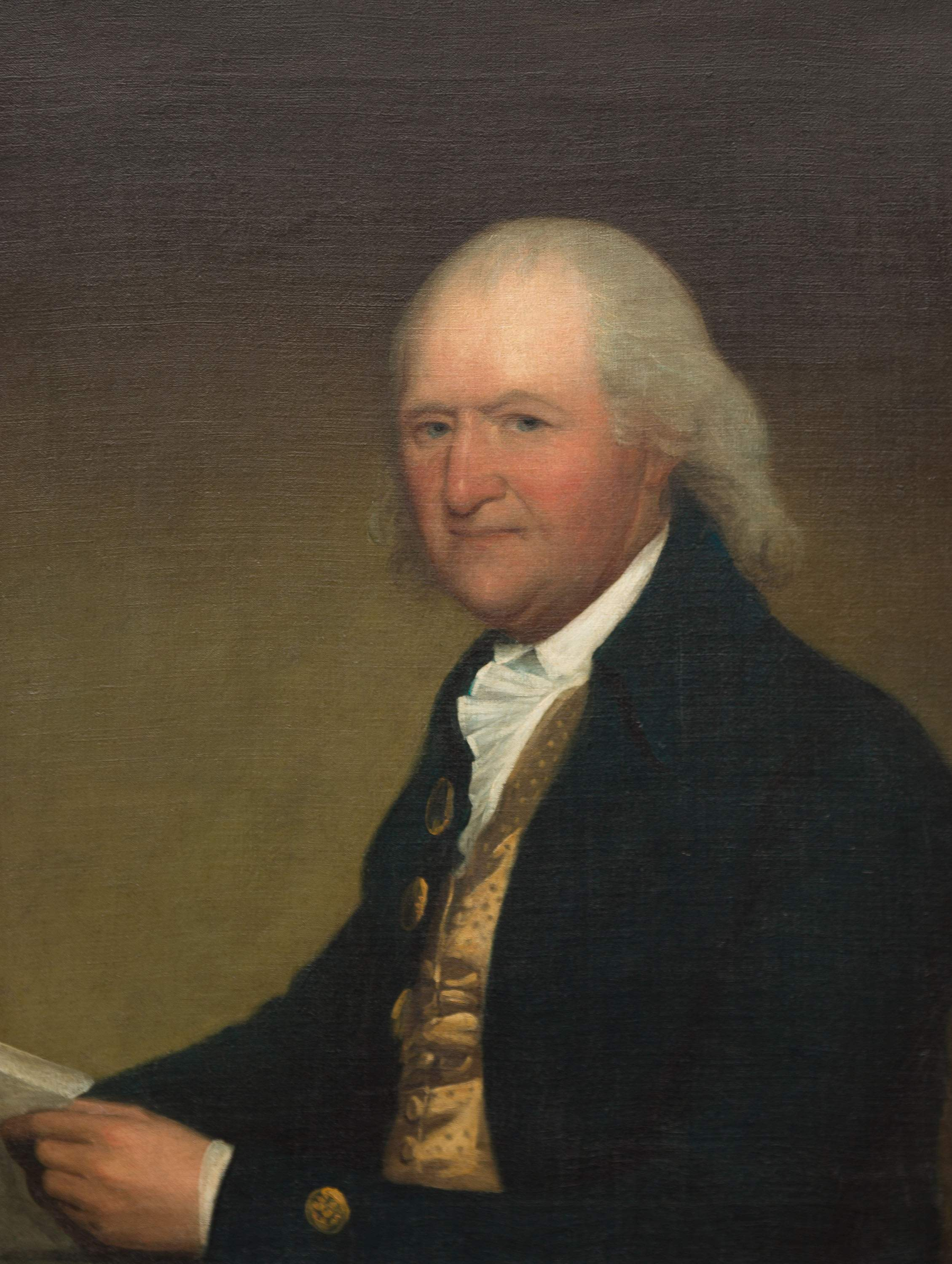
- Portrait of Stuyvesant by Gilbert Stuart, c. 1793-95
- Born: Petrus Stuyvesant; October 13, 1727; New York City, Province of New York, British America
- Died: October 7, 1805 (aged 77); New York City, New York, U.S.
- Spouse: Margaret Livingston (m. 1764)
- Children: 5, including Nicholas, Peter
- Parent(s): Peter Gerard Stuyvesant; Judith Bayard Stuyvesant
- Relatives: Stuyvesant family

Petrus "Peter" Stuyvesant (October 13, 1727 – October 7, 1805) was a New York landowner and merchant. He was a member of the Stuyvesant family; his namesake great-grandfather Peter Stuyvesant served as the last Dutch Director-General of New Netherland.

== Early life ==
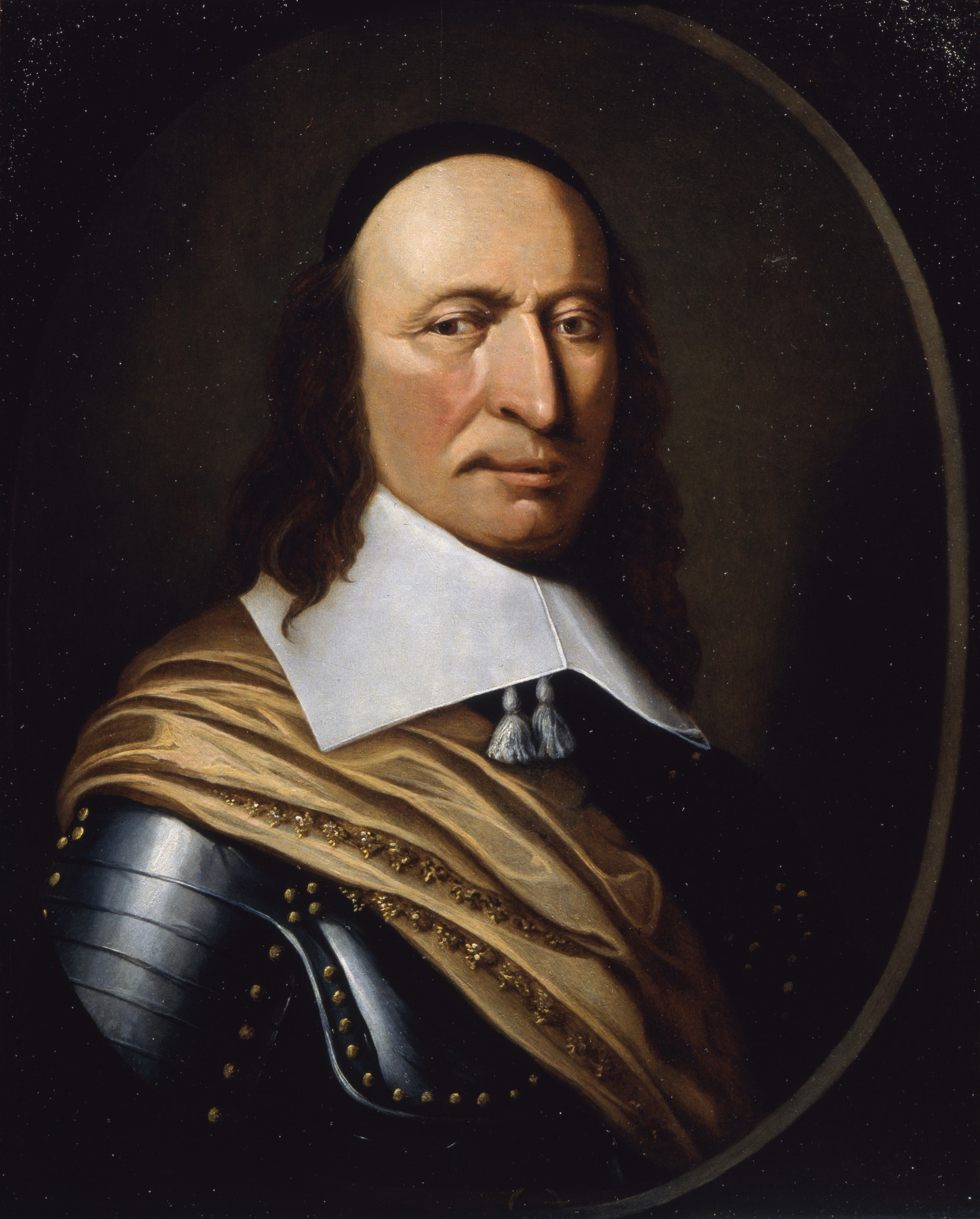
His great-grandfather, Peter Stuyvesant

Stuyvesant was born in New York City on October 13, 1727. He was one of four sons born to Peter Gerard Stuyvesant (1691–1777), who was prominent in the civil affairs of New York and served as a magistrate for over thirty years, and Judith (née Bayard) Stuyvesant (b. 1685), who married in 1720. His father owned the original Stuyvesant family home, and which burned down in 1778. Being the only son that left descendants, Peter inherited the 60-acre (24 ha) Stuyvesant family bouwerie (or farm). His eldest brother was fellow merchant Nicholas William Stuyvesant, who died unmarried in 1780. His other two brothers died in infancy.

His maternal grandparents were Balthazar Bayard (a brother of the Mayor Nicholas Bayard) and Maria (née Loockermans) Bayard. His paternal grandparents were Nicholas William Stuyvesant and Elizabeth (née Van Slichtenhorst) Stuyvesant (a daughter of Brant Van Slichtenhorst, the director of Rensselaerwyck; her sister, Margaretta, was the wife of Philip Pieterse Schuyler). Before their marriage, his grandfather had been married to Maria Beekman, the eldest daughter of Mayor of New York City Wilhelmus Beekman, with whom he had a daughter before Maria's death in 1679. As was common in colonial America, his family regularly intermarried and his grandfathers were first cousins; his maternal grandfather Balthazar was the son of Ann (née Stuyvesant) Bayard, sister of Peter Stuyvesant. Further, Peter Stuyvesant's wife, Judith Bayard, was the sister of Ann's husband, Samuel Bayard.

== Career ==
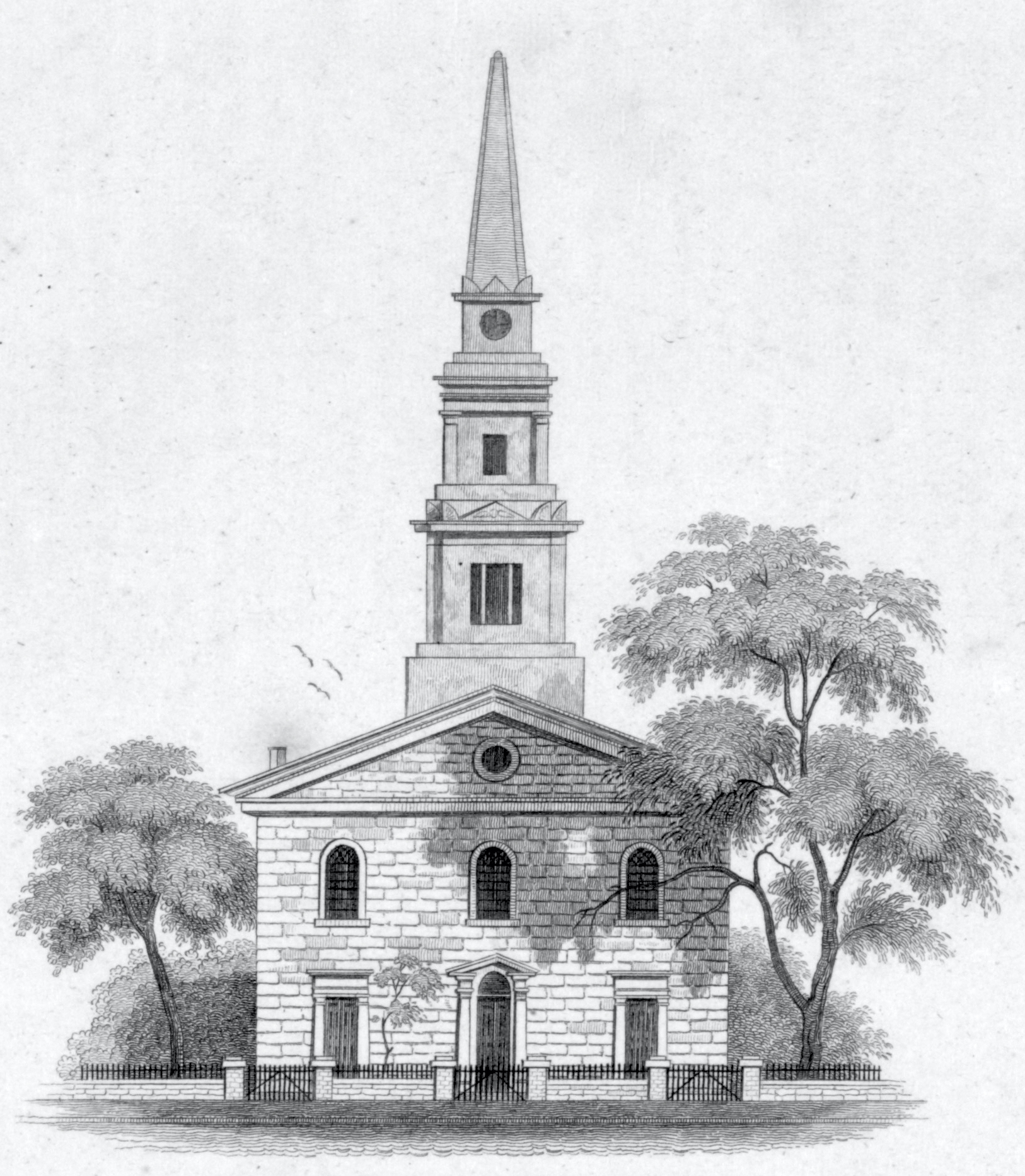
St. Mark's Church on Stuyvesant Street, 1830

Stuyvesant was educated in the schools of New York and became a merchant in New York City like his elder brother. He inherited significant property and great wealth, and was active in philanthropy like his father before him. He is credited with the original layout of the streets between what is today known as Fourth Avenue and the East River, and East 5th Street to East 20th Street.

=== St. Mark's Church ===
In 1793, Stuyvesant sold the property encompassing the Stuyvesant family chapel to the Episcopal Church for $1, stipulating that a new chapel be erected to serve Bowery Village, the community which had coalesced around the Stuyvesant family chapel. His great-grandfather had purchased the land from the Dutch West India Company and in 1651 and by 1660 had built the family chapel. The elder Stuyvesant was interred in a vault under the chapel following his death in 1672. In 1795, the cornerstone of the St. Mark's Church in-the-Bowery was laid, and the fieldstone Georgian style church, built by the architect and mason John McComb Jr., was completed and consecrated on May 9, 1799. Alexander Hamilton provided legal aid in incorporating the church as the first Episcopal parish independent of Trinity Church in New York City.

== Personal life ==
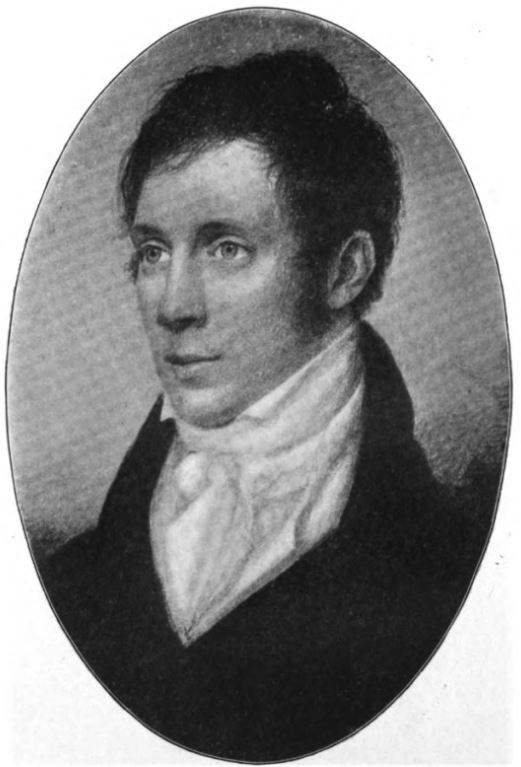
Stuyvesant's younger son, Peter Gerard Stuyvesant

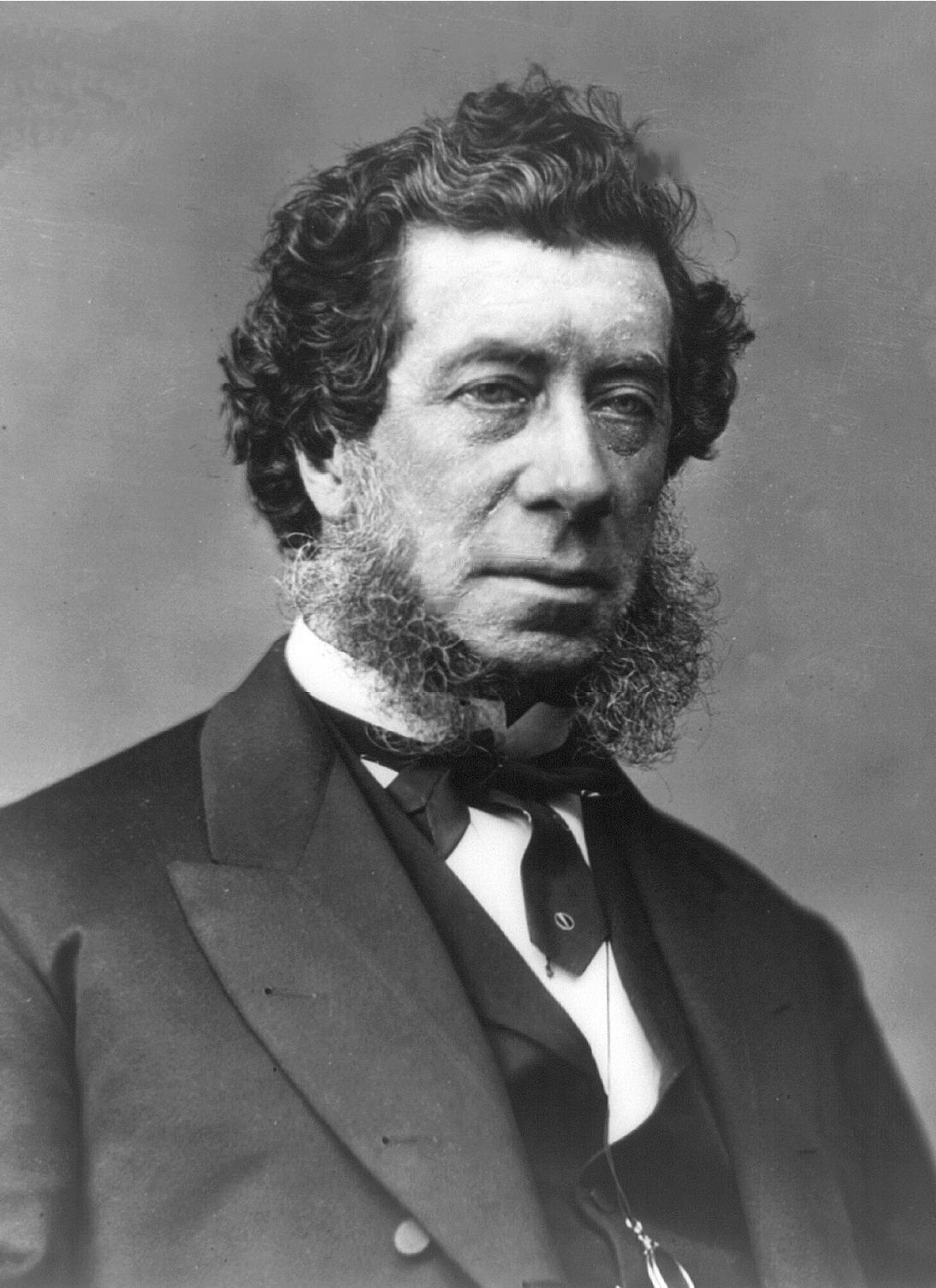
Photograph of Stuyvesant's grandson, Hamilton Fish, a New York governor, United States Senator, and U.S. Secretary of State

In 1764, Stuyvesant was married to Margaret "Peggy" Livingston (1738–1818), the daughter of Gilbert Livingston and Cornelia (née Beekman) Livingston. Margaret was a granddaughter of Hendrick Beekman and Robert Livingston the Elder, the first Lord of Livingston Manor, and great-granddaughter of Wilhelmus Beekman (who arrived in New Amsterdam aboard the same ship as his great-grandfather, Peter Stuyvesant). Among her siblings were Henry Gilbert Livingston (father of Gilbert, John Henry, and Henry Livingston Jr. among others), Alida Livingston (wife of Jacob Rutsen and Hendrick Van Rensselaer), and Joanna Livingston (who was married to Pierre Van Cortlandt, the first Lieutenant Governor of the New York). Together, Peter and Margaret were the parents of five children, two sons and three daughters, including:

- Judith Stuyvesant (1765–1844), who married Benjamin Winthrop (1762–1844), a son of John Still Winthrop and a descendant of Wait Winthrop and Joseph Dudley. They were the grandparents of U.S. Representative John Winthrop Chanler who married Margaret Astor Ward (daughter of Samuel Cutler Ward and granddaughter of William Backhouse Astor Sr.).
- Cornelia Stuyvesant (1768–1825), who married Speaker of the New York State Assembly Dirck Ten Broeck, a son of Abraham Ten Broeck and grandson of Stephen Van Rensselaer I and Dirck Ten Broeck. His younger sister, Elizabeth Ten Broeck, was married to Rensselaer Schuyler (a son of Gen. Philip Schuyler).
- Nicholas William Stuyvesant (1769–1833), who married Catharine Livingston Reade (1777–1863), a descendant of Robert Livingston. He was educated in Scotland, inherited his uncle's "the Bowery House", and had nine children. In 1795, he built a Federal-style house that today is the oldest house in Greenwich Village at 44 Stuyvesant Street.
- Elizabeth Stuyvesant (1775–1854), who married Adjutant General of New York Nicholas Fish, a close friend of Alexander Hamilton, in 1803. As a wedding present to the couple, Stuyvesant built them a residence that is today known as the Hamilton Fish House, and located at 21 Stuyvesant Street.
- Peter Gerard Stuyvesant (1778–1847), who married Susannah Barclay (1785–1805), a daughter of lawyer Thomas Henry Barclay, a Loyalist during the American Revolutionary War who became one of the United Empire Loyalists in Nova Scotia. After her death, he married Helena Rutherfurd (1790–1873), daughter of U.S. Senator John Rutherfurd and Helena (née Morris) Rutherford, and granddaughter of Walter Rutherfurd and Continental Congressman Lewis Morris. He owned "Petersfield, overlooking the East River between 16th and 17th Streets, and developed the family farm into residential housing from Houston Street to 23rd Street.

The American portrait painter Gilbert Stuart made a portrait of Stuyvesant in c. 1793-95, that was later owned by his 2x great-grandson, Winthrop Astor Chanler, and his son, Rear Admiral Hubert Winthrop Chanler (d. 1974), Stuyvesant's 3x great-grandson.

Stuyvesant died in New York City on October 7, 1805, a few days shy of his seventy-eighth birthday. He was buried in the churchyard of St. Mark's Church in-the-Bowery in Manhattan.

=== Descendants ===
Through his eldest daughter Judith, he was a grandfather of Elizabeth Sherriff (née Winthrop) Chanler (1789–1866) (wife of John White Chanler and mother of U.S. Representative John Winthrop Chanler), Margaret Cornelia (née Winthrop) Folsom (1801–1863) (wife of the chargé d'affaires to the Netherlands George Folsom), and Benjamin Robert Winthrop (1804–1879) (who married Eliza Ann Coles Neilson and was the father of Egerton Leigh Winthrop).

Through his daughter Cornelia, he was a grandfather of at least twelve grandchildren including Petrus Stuyvesant Ten Broeck (1792–1849), a priest who married Lucretia Loring Cutter (daughter of Mayor Levi Cutter), and Stephan Philip Van Rensselaer Ten Broeck (1802–1866), a physician who married Mary Nielson.

Through his son Nicholas, he was a grandfather of Gerard Stuyvesant (1805–1859), Nicholas Stuyvesant (1805–1871), and Margaret Livingston Stuyvesant (1806–1845), who married Robert Van Rensselaer (a son of Jeremiah Van Rensselaer and Sybil Adeline (née Kane) Van Rensselaer and nephew of Jacob R. Van Rensselaer).

Through his daughter Elizabeth, he was a grandfather of at least five, including Hamilton Fish (1808–1893), a New York governor, United States Senator, and U.S. Secretary of State, who married Julia Ursin Niemcewiez Kean (sister of U.S. Senator John Kean and granddaughter of Continental Congressman John Kean).
