= Nicholas William Stuyvesant =

American landowner and merchant

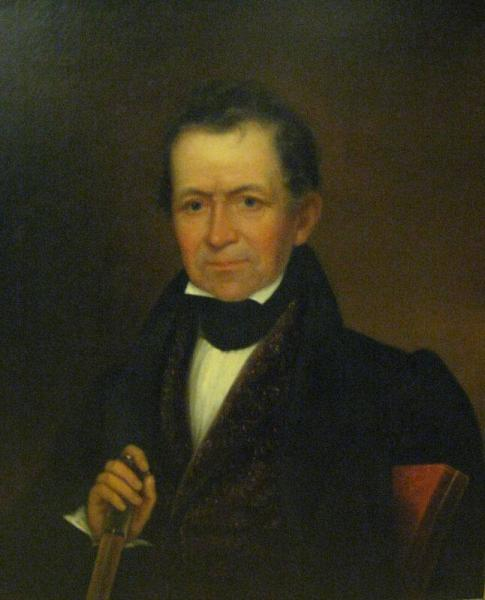
- Born: c. 1769–1770; New York City, Province of New York, British America
- Died: March 11, 1833 (aged 63–64); New York City, U.S.
- Spouse: Catherine Livingston Reade (m. 1795)
- Children: 9
- Parent(s): Peter Stuyvesant; Margaret Livingston
- Relatives: See Stuyvesant family Nicholas Fish (brother-in-law); Hamilton Fish (nephew); Pierre Van Cortlandt (uncle); Dirck Ten Broeck (brother-in-law)

Nicholas William Stuyvesant (1769 – March 11, 1833) was a New York landowner and merchant who was a great-great-grandson of Peter Stuyvesant, the last Dutch Director-General of New Amsterdam.

== Early life ==
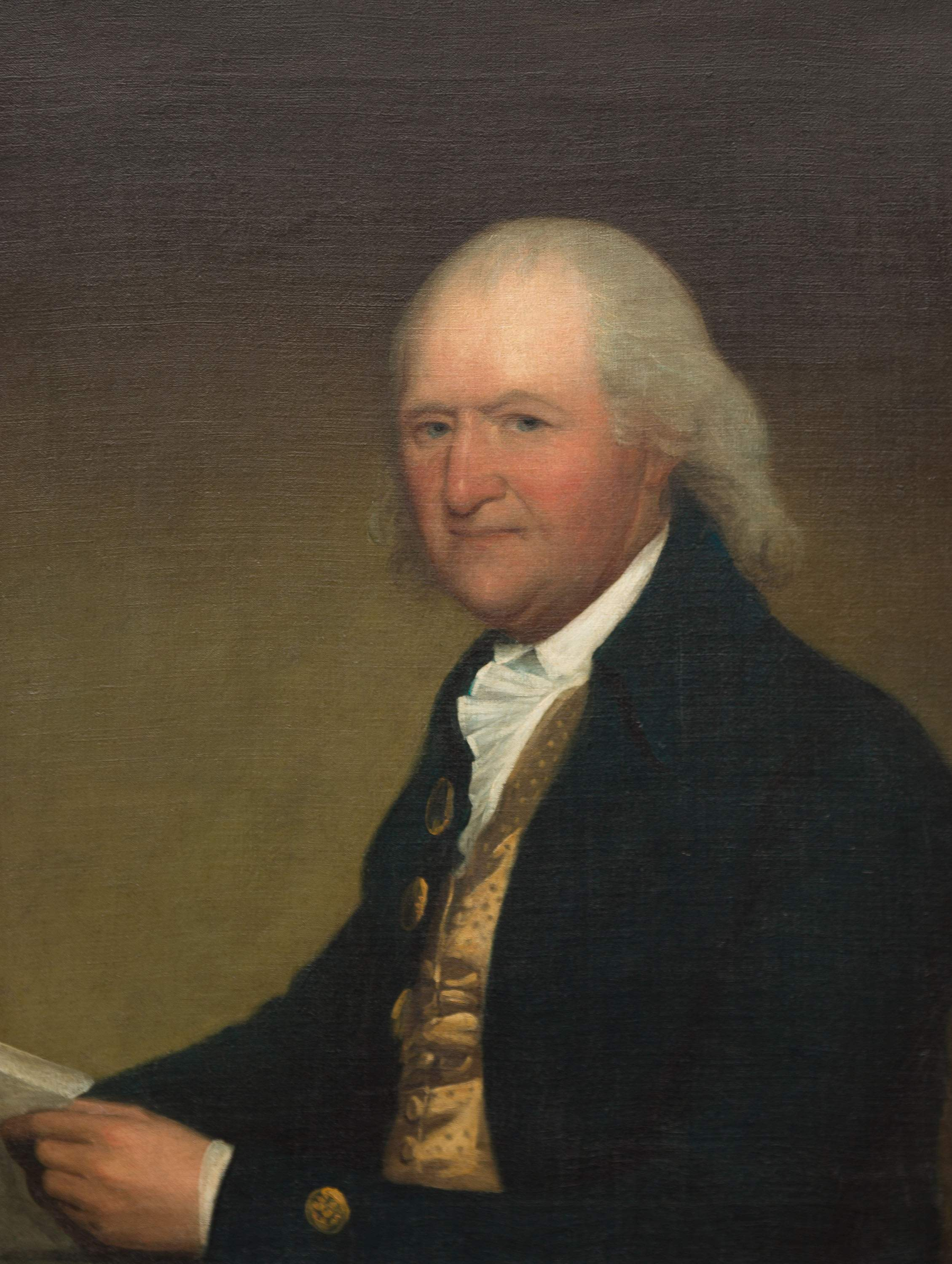
Portrait of his father, Peter Stuyvesant, by Gilbert Stuart

Stuyvesant was born in New York City in 1769 and named after his uncle, Nicholas William Stuyvesant. He was the eldest son of Petrus "Peter" Stuyvesant (1727–1805) and Margaret (née Livingston) Stuyvesant (1738–1818). His siblings included Judith Stuyvesant, who married Benjamin Winthrop (grandparents of U.S. Representative John Winthrop Chanler); Cornelia Stuyvesant, who married Speaker of the New York State Assembly Dirck Ten Broeck, and Elizabeth Stuyvesant, who married Adjutant General of New York Nicholas Fish, and Peter Gerard Stuyvesant.

Nicholas was descended from many of New York's most prominent families and characters. Through his father, he was the 2x great-grandson of Peter Stuyvesant, the last Dutch Director-General of New Netherland. His paternal grandparents were Peter Gerard Stuyvesant and Judith (née Bayard) Stuyvesant of the Bayard family. Through his mother Margaret, he was descended from the Livingston and Beekman families, as she was the daughter of Gilbert Livingston and Cornelia (née Beekman) Livingston, granddaughter of Robert Livingston the Elder, the first Lord of Livingston Manor, and great-granddaughter of Wilhelmus Beekman (who arrived in New Amsterdam aboard the same ship as Peter Stuyvesant). His maternal aunt, Joanna Livingston, was married to Pierre Van Cortlandt, the first Lieutenant Governor of the New York.

== Career ==
He was educated in Scotland, inherited his uncle's "the Bowery House". In 1795, he built a Federal-style house that today is the oldest house in Greenwich Village at 44 Stuyvesant Street.

== Personal life ==
On January 31, 1795, Stuyvesant was married to Catherine Livingston Reade (1777–1863), a daughter of John Reade and Catherine (née Livingston) Reade. Her grandfather was Loyalist merchant Robert Gilbert Livingston and her sister, Helen Sarah Reade, married James Hooker. Together, they were the parents of nine children, six sons and three daughters, including:

- Peter Stuyvesant (1796–1860), who married Julia Rebecca Martin (1805–1883).
- John Reade Stuyvesant (1798–1853), who married Catharine Ackerly (1808–1837), a daughter of Dr. C.O. Ackerly. After her death, he married Mary Austin Yates (1811–1889).
- Catherine Ann Stuyvesant (1801–1872), who married John Mortimer Catlin (1801–1881), a son of Lynde Catlin.
- Nicholas William Stuyvesant (1805–1871), who married Catherine Augusta Chesebrough (1807–1876), an aunt of Robert Chesebrough.
- Gerard Stuyvesant (1806–1859), who married Susan Rivington Van Horne (1812–1889) in 1836.
- Margaret Livingston Stuyvesant (1806–1845), who married Robert Van Rensselaer (1805–1840), eldest son of Jeremiah Van Rensselaer and Sybil Adeline (née Kane) Van Rensselaer and nephew of Jacob R. Van Rensselaer.
- Robert Reade Stuyvesant, who married Margaret Augusta Mildeberger. After his death, she married Walton Hazard Peckham.
- Helen Cornelia Stuyvesant (1808–1890), who married Henry Dudley (1799–1837). After his death, she married Francis Olmsted. After his death, she married Dr. William Starbuck Mayo.
- Joseph Reade Stuyvesant (1809–1873), who married Jane Ann Browning in 1840.

Stuyvesant died in the Stuyvesant family mansion on March 11, 1833.

=== Descendants ===
Through his daughter Catherine, he was a grandfather of Nicholas William Stuyvesant Catlin (1829–1897), who worked in marine insurance for fifty years and "was well known as a scholarly man of wide reading and many acquirements, but save an occasional appearance at the many clubs and societies with which he was connected, he lived in retirement, satisfied with the companions of his leisure—his books."

Through his daughter Helen, he was a grandfather of Henry Dudley (1837–1900), "a gentleman of wealth and leisure, who employed the opportunities thus given him for doing good in charitable work with an unstinted hand." He married Anna Mott Fellows.
