= Robert Livingston (1718–1775) =

American landowner and politician (1718–1775)

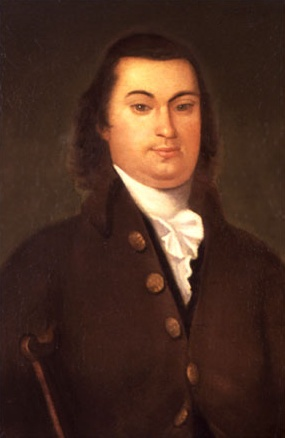

Judge of the New York Supreme Court of Judicature
- In office 1763–1775

Member of the New York General Assembly
- In office 1759–1768

Personal details
- Born: Robert Robert Livingston; August 1718 Clermont, Province of New York
- Died: December 9, 1775 (aged 57) Clermont, New York, U.S.
- Spouse: Margaret Beekman (m. 1742)
- Relations: See Livingston family
- Children: Robert, Henry, John, Gertrude, Edward
- Parent(s): Robert Livingston; Margaret Howarden

Robert Robert Livingston, also called The Judge (August 1718 – December 9, 1775), was a prominent colonial American politician, and a leading patriot in New York in the years leading up to the American Revolution.

== Early life ==
Robert R. Livingston was born in August 1718 at Clermont Manor in what was then the Province of New York, a part of British America. He was the only child of Robert Livingston (1688–1775), known as "Robert of Clermont" and Margaret Howarden (1693–1758). His mother was the daughter of a wealthy English merchant in New York and granddaughter of Captain Isaac Bedlow, a Huguenot after whom Bedloe's Island is named.

His paternal grandparents were Robert Livingston the Elder (1654–1728) and Alida (née Schuyler) Van Rensselaer Livingston (1656–1727), daughter of Philip Pieterse Schuyler (1628–1683) and widow of Nicholas Van Rensselaer. His uncle was Philip Livingston (1686–1749), the second Lord of Livingston Manor. His great-grandfather was Reverend John Livingston, a Church of Scotland minister who died in exile in 1673.

== Career ==
Livingston, known as 'Judge Livingston' to distinguish him from his eponymous father and other prominent Livingstons, was a member of the New York Provincial Assembly from 1759 to 1768. He served as judge of the admiralty court from 1760 to 1763. He was a delegate to the Stamp Act Congress of 1765, and, in 1775, a member of the Committee of One Hundred, which briefly governed New York City.

From 1763 until 1775, he served as a Justice of the New York Supreme Court of Judicature.

== Family ==
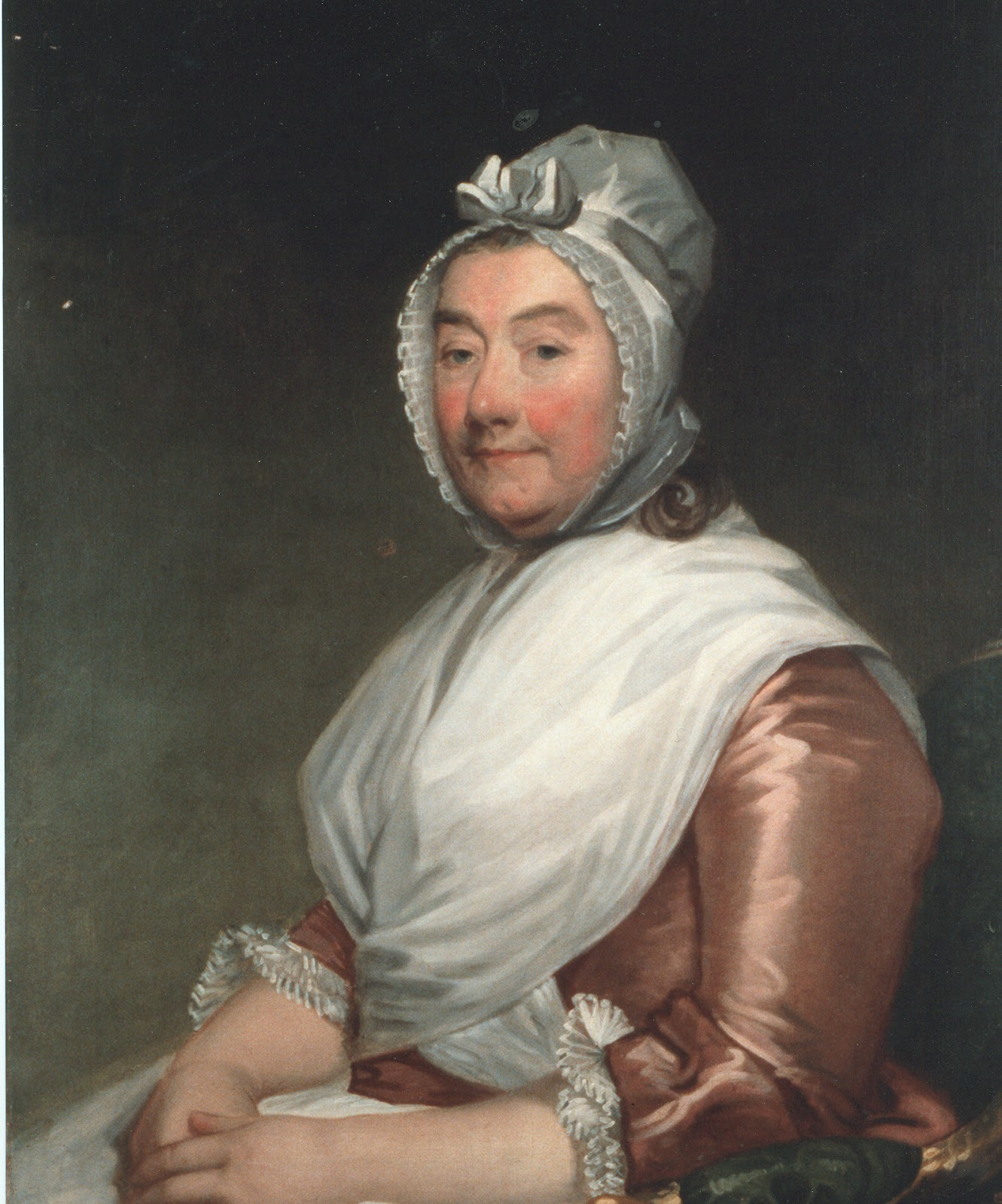
Portrait of his wife, Margaret Beekman Livingston, by Gilbert Stuart, c. 1795

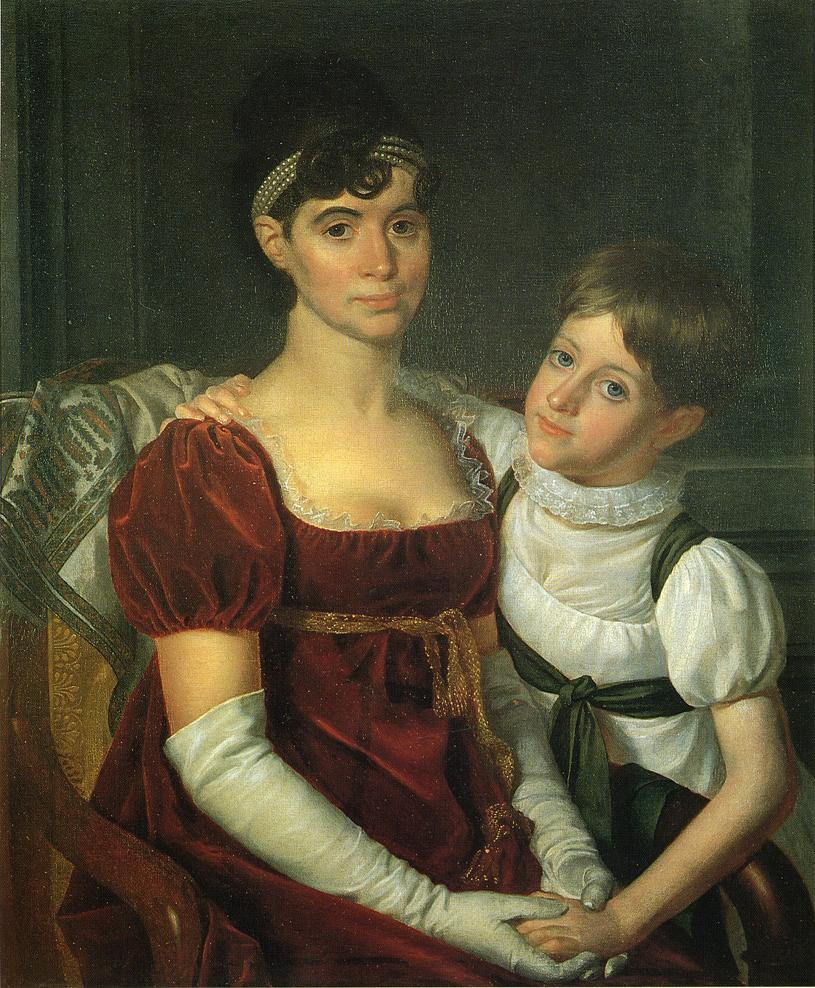
Robert's daughter, Alida Livingston Armstrong and Daughter, by Rembrandt Peale, ca. 1810

In 1742, he married Margaret Beekman (1724–1800), daughter of Col. Henry Beekman and Janet Livingston (his second cousin), a descendant of Wilhelmus Beekman and heir to immense tracts of land in Dutchess and Ulster counties. Their children included:

- Janet Livingston (b.1743-1824), who married Gen. Richard Montgomery (1738–1775) in 1773.
- Robert R. Livingston (1746–1813), the Chancellor of New York who married Mary Stevens, daughter of John Stevens, in 1770.
- Margaret Livingston (1749–1823), who married Thomas Tillotson (1750–1832), an army surgeon who became New York Secretary of State.
- Henry Beekman Livingston (1750–1831), who commanded the 4th New York Regiment at the Battles of Saratoga and Monmouth and during the winter at Valley Forge. He married Ann Hume Shippen, daughter of Prof. Dr. William Shippen and Alice Lee of Philadelphia, in 1781.
- Catharine Livingston (1752–1849), who married Freeborn Garrettson (1752–1827) in 1791 and helped to bring Methodism to the Hudson River Valley.
- John R. Livingston (1755–1851), a merchant who took over his father's gunpowder mill during the Revolutionary War. He married, first, to Margaret Sheafe in 1779. After her death, he married Eliza McEvers, the daughter of Charles McEvers and Mary Bache, in 1789. Eliza was the sister of his brother Edwards's first wife Mary.
- Gertrude Livingston (1757–1833), who married Gov. Morgan Lewis (1754–1844), son of Francis Lewis (1713–1802), a signer of the United States Declaration of Independence.
- Joanna Livingston (1759–1827), who married Peter R. Livingston (1766–1847), acting Lieutenant Governor of New York.
- Alida Livingston (1761–1822), who married John Armstrong Jr. (1758–1843), a U.S. Senator, U.S. Secretary of War, and U.S. Minister to France who was the son of Gen. John Armstrong, Sr.
- Edward Livingston (1764–1836), a U.S. Senator and U.S. Secretary of State who married Mary McEvers, the daughter of Charles McEvers and Mary Bache, in 1788. After her death, he married Madame Louise Moreau de Lassy in 1805. She was the sister of Auguste Davezac.

Livingston died on December 9, 1775, at his estate in Clermont, New York, several months after his own father's death on June 27, 1775.

=== Descendants ===
Through his son Major John R., he was the grandfather of Robert Montgomery Livingston (1790–1838), who married Sarah Barclay Bache in 1811. Livingston and his father were known for their quarrels with Cornelius Vanderbilt and Thomas Gibbons over his operation of steamboats and the breakup of the Chancellor Livingston and Gov. Aaron Ogden monopoly resulting from the landmark Supreme Court decision in Gibbons v. Ogden.

His grandson-in-law was George Croghan, a nephew of William Clark, the explorer, Lewis Livingston, Charles Edward Livingston and George Rogers Clark. His granddaughters include Margaret Lewis, Elizabeth Stevens Livingston, Margaret Maria Livingston, Julia Livingston, and Coralie Livingston.

Through Chancellor Livingston, he was the 2x great-grandfather of Mary Livingston Ludlow (1843–1919), herself the mother of his 3x great-granddaughter, Anna Hall Roosevelt (1863–1892), herself the mother of First Lady of the United States Eleanor Roosevelt (1884–1962).

== See also ==
- Livingston family
- Wilhelmus Beekman
