= John Henry Livingston =

American Dutch Reformed minister and academic (1746–1825)

The Reverend John Henry Livingston
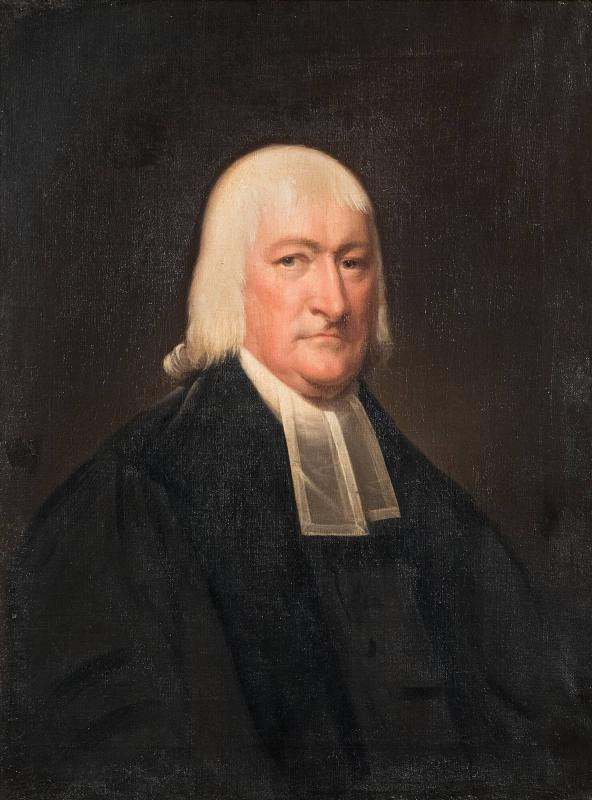
- Portrait by Ezra Ames, c. 1800

4th President of Rutgers University
- In office 1810–1825
- Preceded by: Ira Condict
- Succeeded by: Philip Milledoler

Personal details
- Born: May 30, 1746 near Poughkeepsie, Province of New York, British America
- Died: January 25, 1825 (aged 78) New Brunswick, New Jersey, United States
- Spouse: Sarah Livingston (m. 1775; died 1814)
- Children: Henry Alexander Livingston
- Parent(s): Henry Livingston; Susannah Conklin
- Relatives: See Livingston family
- Education: Yale College (1762); Utrecht University (1770)
- Occupation: Minister

John Henry Livingston (May 30, 1746—January 25, 1825) was an American Dutch Reformed minister and member of the Livingston family, who served as the fourth President of Queen's College (now Rutgers University), from 1810 until his death in 1825.

== Early life ==
Livingston was born on May 30, 1746, near Poughkeepsie, New York in what was then the Province of New York in British America. He was a son of Dr. Henry Livingston (1714-1799) and Susannah Storm (née Conklin) Livingston (1724-1793). His siblings included Continental Congressman Gilbert Livingston, author Henry Livingston Jr. (the grandfather of U.S. Senator Sidney Breese and Admiral Samuel Livingston Breese), and Alida (née Livingston) Woolsey.

His maternal grandparents were Capt. John Conklin and Annetje (née Storm) Conklin. His paternal grandparents were Lt. Col. Hubertus "Gilbert" Livingston, himself the son of Robert Livingston the Elder, 1st Lord of Livingston Manor, and Cornelia (née Beekman) Livingston, a granddaughter of Wilhelmus Beekman, Mayor of New York, and niece of Gerardus Beekman.

Livingston graduated from Yale College with a Bachelor of Arts in 1762. In 1762, he matriculated at the University of Utrecht (the Netherlands). and on May 16, 1770, he earned a Doctor of Theology at the same university. The title description of his thesis was: Specimen theologicum inaugurale exhibens observationes de foederis Sinaitici natura ex ejus fine demonstrata. Qod summo deo annuente, Ex Auctoritate Rectoris Magnifici, Meinardi Tydeman, ... Publico offert examini Johannes H. Livingston A.L.M. V.D.M. Neo-Eboracensis. – Trajecti Ad Rhenum : Joannis Broedelet.

== Career ==
Livingston was ordained into the ministry of the Dutch Reformed Church by the Classis of Amsterdam in 1770. Subsequent to his return from the Netherlands, Livingston served as a pastor to the Reformed Church in New York City. He became a leading figure in the church and negotiated the peaceful reunifications of its two opposing factions.

In 1778, Livingston inherited the Jamaican sugar plantation Friendship Estate from his father-in-law, as the family were well-established slave owners in the Caribbean. Along with his brother-in-law Philip Philip Livingston (1741-1787), he sold the plantation and over two hundred slaves bound to the property in 1784.

From 1787–1792, Livingston was the principal of Erasmus Hall Academy in Flatbush, NY.

When Queen's College offered Livingston the presidency as early as 1807, he initially declined. However, the Trustees continued to offer, and Livingston accepted the post in 1810. He was also a professor of theology. Queen's College fell into financial trouble and was forced to close its doors in 1816. Livingston continued teaching at the New Brunswick Theological Seminary (which shared facilities with Queen's College), and continued to lobby and fundraise for the reopening of Queen's College. This was gained ten months after his death in 1825.

=== Residence ===
After being chosen to head Queen's College, Livingston purchased a 150-acre (0.61 km^{2}) plot of land in nearby Raritan Landing, which was afterward known as the Livingston Manor. A Greek Revival mansion built by descendants Robert and Louisa Livingston around 1843 stands on the property, now known as Livingston Homestead. At the turn of the 20th century, the property was developed as a streetcar suburb. In 2004, it was designated as part of the Livingston Manor Historic District. The house and the district are listed on the New Jersey Register of Historic Places and the National Register of Historic Places.

== Personal life ==
On November 26, 1775, Livingston married his second cousin, Sarah Livingston (1752–1814), a daughter of Philip Livingston, a Continental Congressman and signor of the Declaration of Independence, and Christina (née Ten Broeck) Livingston, sister of Albany Mayor Abraham Ten Broeck. Their only child was a son:

- Henry Alexander Livingston (1776–1849), who was elected as a member of the New York State Assembly and the New York State Senate. Henry married twice and had eighteen children.

Livingston died on January 25, 1825, in New Brunswick, New Jersey.

=== Descendants ===
Through his only child Henry, he was the grandfather of eighteen grandchildren, including Christina Ten Broeck Livingston (d. 1858), Cornelia Beekman Livingston (d. 1858), Henry Philip Livingston (d. 1861), Frederica Charlotte (née Livingston) Kendrick (d. 1898), Henrietta Ulrica Livingston (d. 1916), Sarah (née Livingston) Hoff (1797–1818), Eliza H. Livingston (1799–1819), John Alexander Livingston (1801–1865), Louisa Matilda (née Livingston) James (1807–1849), Robert Sayers Livingston (1819–1821), Jane Murray (née Livingston) Crosby (1830–1911) and Augustus Linlithgow Livingston (1839–1911).

== See also ==
- Livingston family
