= Robert Livingston (1708–1790) =

Lord of Livingston Manor (1708–1790)

3rd Lord of Livingston Manor
- In office 1749 – 1790
- Preceded by: Philip Livingston
- Succeeded by: Abolished

Member of the New York General Assembly
- In office 1737 – 1758
- Preceded by: Gilbert Livingston
- Succeeded by: William Livingston

Personal details
- Born: December 16, 1708 Albany, Province of New York
- Died: November 27, 1790 (aged 81)
- Spouses: Maria Thong (m. 1731; died 1765) Gertrude Van Rensselaer Schuyler (1766–1790)
- Children: 13, including Walter Livingston
- Parent(s): Philip Livingston; Catharina Van Brugh
- Relatives: See Livingston family

Robert Livingston (December 16, 1708 – November 27, 1790) was the third and final Lord of Livingston Manor and a member of the assembly for the manor from 1737 to 1790.

== Early life ==
Robert Livingston was born on December 16, 1708, in Albany, New York, the eldest son of Catharina (née Van Brugh) Livingston and Philip Livingston (1686–1749), the second Lord of Livingston Manor. His younger brothers were Peter Van Brugh Livingston, who married Mary Alexander (sister of Lord Stirling), Philip Livingston, who married Christina Ten Broeck, and William Livingston, who married Susannah French. All the brothers had multiple children.

He was the grandson of Robert Livingston the Elder, a New York colonial official, fur trader, and businessman who was granted a patent to 160,000 acres (650 km^{2}/ 250 sq mi) along the Hudson River, and becoming the first lord of Livingston Manor. His paternal grandmother was Alida Schuyler, the daughter of Philip Pieterse Schuyler and the widow of Nicholas Van Rensselaer. His maternal grandparents were Pieter Van Brugh and Sara (née Cuyler) Van Brugh.

== Career ==
From 1737 to 1758, Livingston succeeded his uncle Gilbert Livingston to represent Livingston Manor in the New York General Assembly. He was succeeded by William Livingston in 1759 who served until 1761.

=== Livingston Manor ===
Upon the death of his father in February 1749, Robert inherited Livingston Manor and became the third Lord of the manor. Shortly after he acquired 1,000,000 acres (4,000 km^{2}; 1,600 sq mi) of the Catskill Mountains in what had formerly been the Hardenbergh Patent.

Livingston found himself embroiled in a border dispute with Massachusetts when some New Englanders began to settle on the eastern portion of the Manor. Some of the settlers were Livingston's own tenants, who tired of paying rent moved east and contended they were now in Massachusetts. By 1767, Livingston Manor had about 285 tenant families, together leasing 30,000 from Robert, according to C.A. Kierner. Settlement was disbursed, with areas adjoining waterways, mills, and ironworks, the more densely populated. The tenants paid their rent in wheat. In 1760 Livingston Manor produced 50,000 bushels; Robert had claim to one-tenth as income.

During the Revolution, he made available to the New York Committee of Safety and the Continental Army, the iron mines and foundry on the Manor, while his sons, Peter Robert, Walter, John and Henry, were actively involved on the American side.

== Personal life ==
On May 20, 1731, he married Maria Thong (1711–1765), granddaughter of Governor Rip Van Dam (1660–1749). Robert Livingston expected his sons to take their place as his business agents and had them educated accordingly. Together, they had thirteen children:

- Catherine Livingston (b. 1732), died in infancy.
- Philip Robert Livingston (1733–1756), died of kidney trouble.
- Sarah Livingston (1735–1745), who died young.
- Peter Robert Livingston (1737–1793), a member of the Provincial Convention of 1775, who married cousin Margaret Livingston (1738–1809), a granddaughter of Robert Livingston the Younger (1663–1725).
- Maria "Mary" Livingston (1738–1821), who married James Duane.
- Walter Livingston (1740–1797), who was the owner of Teviotdale mansion in Columbia County.
- Robert Livingston (1742–1794), better known as Robert Cambridge due to his attendance of Cambridge University, who married Alice Swift (1751–1816).
- Catherine Livingston (1744–1832), who married John Patterson (1740–1823), brother of Walter Patterson and father of Daniel Patterson.
- Sarah Livingston (1745/6–1749), who died young
- Alida Livingston (1747–1791), who married Valentine Gardiner.
- Margarita Livingston (1748–1749), died young
- John Livingston (1749–1822), who married first Maria Ann Leroy (1759–1797), daughter of Jacob Leroy and Cornelia Rutgers, and second Catherine (Livingston) Ridley, his first cousin, the daughter of William Livingston and the widow of Matthew Ridley.
- Hendrick "Henry" Livingston (1752–1823), who died unmarried.

In 1764, a portrait of Livingston was painted by Thomas McIlworth (who also painted British officer John Bradstreet in 1764) at Livingston Manor.

In 1766, he married Gertrude (née Van Rensselaer) Schuyler (1714–1790), daughter of Maria Van Cortlandt and Kiliaen Van Rensselaer, the fifth Patroon and second Lord of the manor of Rensselaerwyck. She was a widow of Adonijah "Adonis" Schuyler, who died in 1763 and was a son of Arent Schuyler.

Livingston died on November 27, 1790, at the age of eighty-one. He broke the family tradition of leaving the estate to his eldest son and shared Livingston Manor among his five sons and his son-in-law James Duane.

== See also ==
- Livingston family
