= Robert Livingston (1688–1775) =

Politician (1688–1775)

Member of the New York General Assembly
- In office 1726–1727
- Preceded by: Robert Livingston the Elder
- Succeeded by: Gilbert Livingston

Personal details
- Born: July 24, 1688 Albany, Province of New York, British America
- Died: June 27, 1775 (aged 86) Clermont Manor
- Spouse: Margaret Howarden (m. 1717; died 1758)
- Relations: Philip Livingston (brother); Edward Livingston (grandson)
- Children: Robert Livingston
- Parent(s): Robert Livingston the Elder; Alida Schuyler van Rensselaer Livingston

Robert Livingston (July 24, 1688 – June 27, 1775) was a British colonial era landowner, businessman, and Provincial assemblyman. Known as Robert of Clermont, he was the son of Robert Livingston the Elder and father of Robert Livingston, "the Judge" (1718–1775). He was a member of New York colonial assembly from 1726 until 1727.

== Early life and family ==
Robert Livingston was born on the afternoon of July 24, 1688, at his father's Albany, New York townhouse, at "Elm Tree Corner", the intersection of State and Pearl Streets and one of early Albany's principal crossroads. He was the fifth child, and third son, of Alida (née Schuyler) Van Rensselaer Livingston and Robert Livingston the Elder, who was downriver in New York engaged in business with Governor Dongan at the time of Robert's birth. Among his eight siblings were elder brother Philip Livingston and younger brother Gilbert Livingston.

His maternal grandfather was Philip Pieterse Schuyler (1628–1683) and his paternal grandfather was Reverend John Livingston, a Church of Scotland minister who died in exile in 1673. His mother, Alida, had previously been married to Nicholas van Rensselaer, but after his death, she married Robert Livingston in 1679. Alida taught her children to read and write both English and Dutch. At the invitation of his brother William, Robert the Elder sent his eleven-year-old son, Robert, to Scotland to be educated at the Latin school in Leith. Later he studied at the High School in Edinburgh. He went to London for the completion of his education and studied law there at the Temple. Upon reaching the age of twenty-five, he returned to America and opened a law office in Albany. He abandoned the profession in 1713 to move to New York and begin a mercantile career. However, he returned to Livingston Manor to help with the management thereof.

== Clermont ==
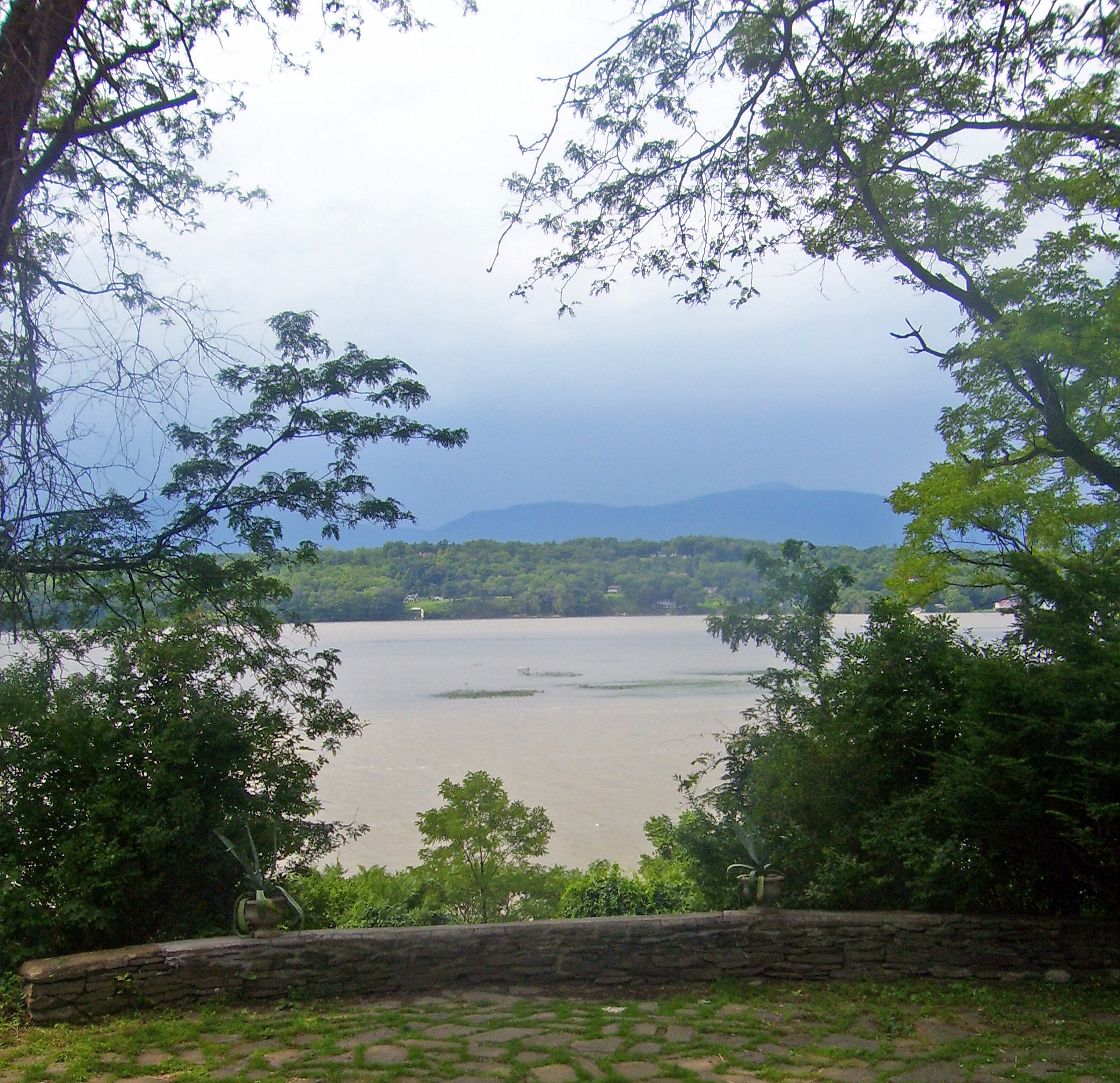
Hudson view from Clermont Manor

Following the death of his father, the first Lord of Livingston Manor, in 1728, most of the manor was inherited by the eldest surviving son Philip, but 13,000 acres (53 km^{2}) south of the Roeliff Jansen Kill was willed to Robert. Known as the "Lower Manor", Robert named his estate "Ancram", after the parish where his grandfather, Rev. John Livingston had served. It was also the same name his brother Philip had given to the ironworks at Livingston Manor.

Around 1730, Robert built a large stone and brick Georgian house, and sometime after 1740 renamed the estate "Clare Mount" ("clear mountain"), a reference to the view of the Catskills that rise across the river from the front door of the house. At that time Robert was heavily involved in land speculation in the Catskill Mountains land, and would eventually own nearly 500,000 acres.

After the house was burned by the British in 1777, the family adopted the name Clermont for the estate. The house was rebuilt by his daughter-in-law, Margaret Beekman Livingston, wife of Judge Livingston, and is today a state park and listed on the National Register of Historic Places.

== Personal life ==
In 1717, Livingston married Margaret Howarden (1693–1758), at the Reformed Dutch Church in New York. His mother, Alida, did not attend. Margaret was the daughter of a wealthy English merchant in New York and granddaughter of Captain Bethlow, a Huguenot after whom Bedloe's Island is named. Bedloe's Island, in New York harbor is now known as Liberty Island and the site of the Statue of Liberty. Their only child was:

- Robert R. Livingston (1718–1775), who married Margaret Beekman, daughter of Henry Beekman and Janet Livingston.

Margaret died in December 1758 and was interred in a burial vault constructed 200 yards north of the Livingston family home at Clermont. Livingston died on June 27, 1775, at the age of 87 and was buried with his wife in the family vault. Upon his death, the "Lower Manor" became the property of his only child, Robert R. Livingston, or Judge Livingston as he was known in Provincial New York.

=== Depiction ===
His grandson, Edward Livingston (1764–1836) described Robert of Clermont at eighty-four as: "... a gentleman... tall and somewhat bent, but not emaciated by age which had marked, but not disfigured, a face once remarkable for its regular beauty of features, and still beaming with the benevolence and intelligence that had always illuminated it. He marked the epoch at which he retired from the world by preserving its costume: the flowing wool powered wig, the bright brown coat, with large cuffs and square shirts, the cut velvet waistcoast, with ample flaps and the breeches scarcely covering the knee, the silk stocking, rolled over them with embroidered clocks, and shining square-toed shoes, fastened near the ankle and small embossed gold buckles. These were retained in his service, not to affect a singularity, but because he thought it ridiculous at his time of life to follow the quick succession of fashion." He always rose at five and read until breakfast. The year before his death, he took up the study of German and spoke it fluently.

"The patriarch of Clermont was in many ways the spoiled younger son of the self-made man. A failure in the law, in business, and in the eyes of his own parents, he nonetheless entered his final years with the satisfaction that he had not only maintained the estate passed on to him by his father, but had increased it 40-fold through his speculation in Catskill Mountain lands."

== See also ==
- Livingston family
