= Henry Livingston Jr. =

American poet (1748–1828)

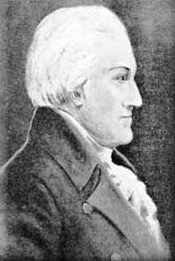
- Born: Henry Livingston Jr. October 13, 1748; Poughkeepsie, Province of New York, British America
- Died: February 29, 1828 (aged 79); Poughkeepsie, New York, U.S.
- Spouses: Sarah Welles (m. 1774; died 1783) Jane Patterson (m. 1793)
- Children: 12
- Parent(s): Henry Livingston, Sr. Susannah Conklin
- Relatives: See Livingston family

Henry Livingston Jr. (October 13, 1748 – February 29, 1828) was an American poet, and has been proposed as being the uncredited author of the 1823 poem A Visit from St. Nicholas, more popularly known (after its first line) as The Night Before Christmas. Credit for the poem was taken in 1837 by Clement Clarke Moore, a Bible scholar in New York City, nine years after Livingston's death. It was not until a further twenty years had passed that the Livingston family knew of Moore's claim, and it was not until 1900 that they went public with their own claim. Since then, the question has been repeatedly raised and argued by experts on both sides.

== Early life ==
Livingston was born on October 13, 1748, in Poughkeepsie, New York, to Dr. Henry Gilbert Livingston Sr. (1714–1799) and Susannah Storm Conklin (1724–1793). His siblings included Gilbert Livingston, Reverend John Henry Livingston, Cornelia Livingston Van Kleeck, Catherine Elizabeth Livingston Mifflin, Joanna Livingston Schenck, Susan Livingston Duyckinck, Alida Livingston Woolsey, Robert Henry Livingston, Beekman Livingston, Catherine H. Livingston and Helena Livingston Platt.

His maternal grandparents were Capt. John Conklin and Annetje (née Storm) Conklin. His paternal grandparents were Lt. Col. Hubertus "Gilbert" Livingston (b. 1690), himself the son of Robert Livingston the Elder, 1st Lord of Livingston Manor, and Cornelia (née Beekman) Livingston, a granddaughter of Wilhelmus Beekman, Mayor of New York, and niece of Gerardus Beekman.

Following his marriage to Sarah Welles in 1774, Livingston engaged in farming.

== Revolutionary War ==
During the Revolutionary War, Livingston held a commission as Major under Richard Montgomery on the 1775 expedition to Canada. He was commissioned on August 2, and kept a journal of his entire experience, beginning August 25 until arriving home on December 22.

Henry Livingston Jr. is often confused with another Henry Livingston, whose service during the Revolution overlapped with Henry Livingston Jr's for a short while in 1775. The other Henry's full title was Colonel Henry Beekman Livingston (1750-1831), and while Henry Livingston Jr. was serving as Major in the 3rd Regiment in the campaign against the British in Quebec, Henry Beekman Livingston was serving as Captain in the 4th Regiment, and was involved in the very same battle. All the available evidence, from personal letters, etc., indicates Henry Livingston Jr. retired from service as Major in December of 1775.

== Career ==
Over the next ten years, Livingston began writing poetry and making drawings for his friends and family, some of which ended up in the pages of New York Magazine and the Poughkeepsie Journal. Although he signed his drawings, his poetry was usually anonymous or signed simply "R".

=== Authorship of A Visit from St. Nicholas ===
The famous Christmas poem first appeared in the Troy Sentinel on December 23, 1823. Many sources indicate that the poem was sent to the newspaper by a friend of Clement Clarke Moore, and the person giving the poem to the newspaper, without Moore's knowledge, certainly believed the poem had been written by Moore. However, several of Livingston's children remembered their father reading that very same poem to them fifteen years earlier.

As early as 1837, Charles Fenno Hoffman, a friend of Moore's, put Moore's name on the poem. For decades, Moore refused to deny or confirm authorship of the poem, but he did take credit for it years later, in 1844, in his book Poems, an anthology of his works. At multiple times in his later life, Moore wrote out the poem in longhand for his friends.

Because the poem was first published anonymously, various editions were for many years published both with and without attribution. As a result, it was only in 1859, 36 years after the poem first appeared in print, that Henry's family discovered that Moore was taking credit for what they believed to be their father's poem. That belief went back many years. Around 1807, Henry's sons Charles and Edwin, as well as their neighbor Eliza (who would later marry Charles) remembered their father's reading the poem to them as his own. Following their father's death in 1828, Charles claimed to have found a newspaper copy of the poem in his father's desk, and son Sidney claimed to have found the original handwritten copy of the poem with its original crossouts.

The handwritten copy of the poem was passed from Sidney, on his death, to his brother Edwin. However, the same year that the family discovered Moore's claim of authorship, Edwin claimed to have lost the original manuscript in a house fire in Wisconsin, where he was living with his sister Susan.

By 1879, five separate lines of Henry's descendants had to correspond among themselves, trying to compare their family stories in the hope that someone had some proof that could be brought forward, but there was no documentation beyond family stories. In 1899, even without proof, Sidney's grandson published the first public claim of Henry's authorship in his own newspaper on Long Island. The claim drew little attention.

In 1920, Henry's great grandson, William Sturgis Thomas became interested in the family stories and began to collect the memories and papers of existing descendants, eventually publishing his research in the issue of the Duchess County Historical Society yearbook. Thomas provided this material to Winthrop P. Tryon for his article on the subject in the Christian Science Monitor on August 4, 1920.

Later, Moore descendants arranged to have an elderly family connection, Maria Jephson O'Conor, depose about her memories of Moore's claim of authorship. Livingston himself never claimed authorship, nor has any record ever been found of any printing of the poem with Livingston’s name attached to it.

In 2000 on independent grounds, Donald Wayne Foster, Professor of English at Vassar College, argued in his book Author Unknown, that Livingston is a more likely candidate for authorship than Moore. In response to Foster's claim, Stephen Nissenbaum, professor of history at the University of Massachusetts, wrote in 2001 that based on his research, Moore was the author. In his article, "There Arose Such a Clatter Who Really Wrote 'The Night before Christmas'? (And Why Does It Matter?)", Nissenbaum confirmed Moore's authorship, "I believe he did, and I think I have marshaled an array of good evidence to prove [it]".

Foster's claim has also been countered by document dealer and historian Seth Kaller, who once owned one of Moore's original manuscripts of the poem. Kaller has offered a point-by-point rebuttal of both Foster's linguistic analysis and external findings, buttressed by the work of autograph expert James Lowe and Dr. Joe Nickell, author of Pen, Ink and Evidence.

MacDonald P. Jackson, Emeritus Professor of English at the University of Auckland, New Zealand, and a Fellow of the Royal Society of New Zealand, has spent his entire academic career analyzing authorship attribution. In his 2016 book Who Wrote "the Night Before Christmas"?: Analyzing the Clement Clarke Moore Vs. Henry Livingston Question, he evaluates the opposing arguments as the first analyst to employ the author-attribution techniques of modern computational stylistics. Jackson employs a range of tests to analyze the poetry of both men and introduces a new test, statistical analysis of phonemes; he concludes that Livingston is the true author of the classic work. His conclusion: "Every test, so far applied, associates 'The Night Before Christmas' much more closely with Livingston's verse than with Moore's."

== Personal life ==
In 1774, Livingston married Sarah Welles, the daughter of the Reverend Noah Welles, the minister of the Stamford, Connecticut, Congregational Church. Their daughter was born shortly before Livingston joined the army on a six months' enlistment. Before Sarah's death in 1783, they were the parents of:

- Catherine Livingston (1775–1808), who married Arthur Breese (1770–1825)
- Henry Welles Livingston (1776–1777), who was fatally burned at the age of fourteen months.
- Henry Welles Livingston (1778–1813), who was given the same name as his deceased older brother, according to the common practice of necronyms.
- Cornelia Livingston (1780–1794), who died young.

After Sarah's death, the children were boarded out. Ten years to the day after her death, Livingston remarried. Jane McLean Patterson (1769–1838), at 24, was 21 years younger than her husband. She was the daughter of Matthew Paterson (1732–1817) and Sarah (née Thorpe) Patterson (1739–1831). Their first baby arrived nine months after the wedding. After that, the couple bore seven more children. It was for this second family that Henry Livingston is believed to have written the poem known as "A Visit from St. Nicholas". Their children included:

- Charles Patterson Livingston (1794–1847)
- Sidney Montgomery Livingston (1796–1856), who married Joannah Maria Holthuysen (1804–1862)
- Edward (or Edwin) George Livingston (1798–1863)
- Jane Patterson Livingston (1800–1870), who married Rev. William Barber Thomas (1797–1876)
- Helen Platt Livingston (1802–1859), who married Wakeman Bradley (1783–1865)
- Elizabeth Davenport Livingston (1805–1886), who married Smith Thompson (1768–1843), U.S. Secretary of the Navy and Associate Justice of the U.S. Supreme Court, the widower of her cousin Sarah Livingston (daughter of her Henry's brother Gilbert Livingston). After his death, she married Judge Richard Ray Lansing (1789–1855)
- Susan Catherine Livingston (1807–1889), who married Abraham Gifford Gurney (1809–c. 1880)
- Catherine Breese Livingston (1809–1814), who died young.

Livingston died on February 29, 1828, in Poughkeepsie, New York.

=== Descendants ===
Through his eldest daughter Catherine, he was the grandfather of U.S. Senator from Illinois Sidney Breese (1800–1878) and Rear Admiral Samuel Livingston Breese (1794–1870), who served in the War of 1812, the Mexican–American War, and the American Civil War.
