= Alida Schuyler =

Businesswoman in New York state when it was Nieuw Nederland

Alida Livingston
- Born: Alida Schuyler; 1656; Beverwyck, Albany, Province of New York
- Died: 1727 (aged 70–71); Province of New York
- Spouses: Nicholas van Rensselaer (m. 1675; died 1678) Robert Livingston the Elder (m. 1679–1727)
- Children: 9, including Philip and Robert
- Parent(s): Philip Pieterse Schuyler; Margaretha van Slichtenhorst
- Relatives: Schuyler family

Alida Livingston, Lady of Livingston Manor (née Schuyler; 1656–1727), formerly Alice van Rensselaer, was a New Netherlands-born businesswoman in Dutch Colonial America who exerted a considerable influence in the life of the colony. She was married first to Nicholas van Rensselaer, son of Kiliaen van Rensselaer, a founding director of the Dutch West India Company and first patroon of Rensselaerswyck, then to her late husband's secretary, Robert Livingston the Elder, the first Lord of Livingston Manor.

== Early life ==
Alida Schuyler was born in Beverwyck (Albany), in the New Netherlands (New York) as the daughter of the wealthy fur trader Philip Pieterse Schuyler (1628-1683) and Margaretha van Slichtenhorst (1628-1711), of German ancestry. She was one of ten children born to her parents, including Pieter Schuyler (1657–1724), Arent Schuyler (1662–1730) and Gertruj Schuyler (b. 1654), who was married to Stephanus van Cortlandt (1643–1700).

== Career ==
Alida Schuyler was a major businesswoman particularly during her second marriage, to Robert Livingston the Elder: she acted as his business partner and political and economical adviser, and together they divided the responsibility of the business and exerted a considerable economic and political influence in the Colony.

In 1686, the couple managed to acquire city privileges for Albany. She also participated in a long term lawsuit about the inheritance of her first spouse against his relatives. From 1686, she resided at Livingston Manor. She retired from business for health reasons in 1716.

== Personal life ==
In 1675, she married Nicholas van Rensselaer (1636–1678), the fourth son of Kiliaen van Rensselaer. Kiliaen was a Dutch diamond and pearl merchant from Amsterdam, and one of the founders and directors of the Dutch West India Company; instrumental in the establishment of New Netherland, in 1630 he became the first patroon of Rensselaerswyck. Nicholas, a minister, died shortly after their marriage in 1678.

In 1679, she married her late husband's secretary, Robert Livingston the Elder (1654-1728), the first Lord of Livingston Manor. Livingston amassed one of the largest fortunes in 17th-century New York. They had nine children together:

- Rebecca Livingston (1680-1747), who married John Buchanan (1676-1749)
- Margaret Livingston (1681–1758), who married Samuel Vetch (1668–1732), the Royal Governor of Nova Scotia
- Joanna Philipina Livingston (1683–1689), who died young
- Philip Livingston (1686–1749), the second Lord of the Manor who married Catherine van Brugh
- Robert Livingston (1688–1775), who married Margaret Howarden (1693–1758) and was the owner of the Clermont Estate
- Hubertus "Gilbert" Livingston (b. 1690), who married Cornelia Beekman, granddaughter of Wilhelmus Beekman, Mayor of New York, and niece of Gerardus Beekman
- William Livingston (1692–1692), who died young
- Joanna Livingston (b. 1694)
- Catherine Livingston (1698–1699), who died young

=== Descendants ===
She was the grandmother of Philip Livingston and William Livingston. Her granddaughter, Catherine Livingston, married Abraham De Peyster, a loyalist Officer with the King's American Regiment who served at Battle of King's Mountain.

Through her son, Gilbert Livingston, she was the grandmother of Margaret Livingston (1738–1818), who married Peter Stuyvesant (1727–1805), a great-grandson of the Peter Stuyvesant who commanded the New Netherland colony on Manhattan island, and Joanna Livingston (1722–1808), who married Pierre Van Cortlandt (1721–1814), the first Lieutenant Governor of the New York.

Many Americans are descended from the Livingston family, including George W. Bush, the entire Fish and Kean families, First Lady Eleanor Roosevelt, First Lady of New York Anna Morton, actors Montgomery Clift and Michael Douglas, actress Jane Wyatt, medical resident Asad Rizvi, poet Robert Lowell, cinematographer Floyd Crosby and his son David Crosby, author Wolcott Gibbs, and almost the entire Astor family.
