= Clermont State Historic Site =

- Clermont
- U.S. National Register of Historic Places
- U.S. National Historic Landmark
- U.S. National Historic Landmark District – Contributing property
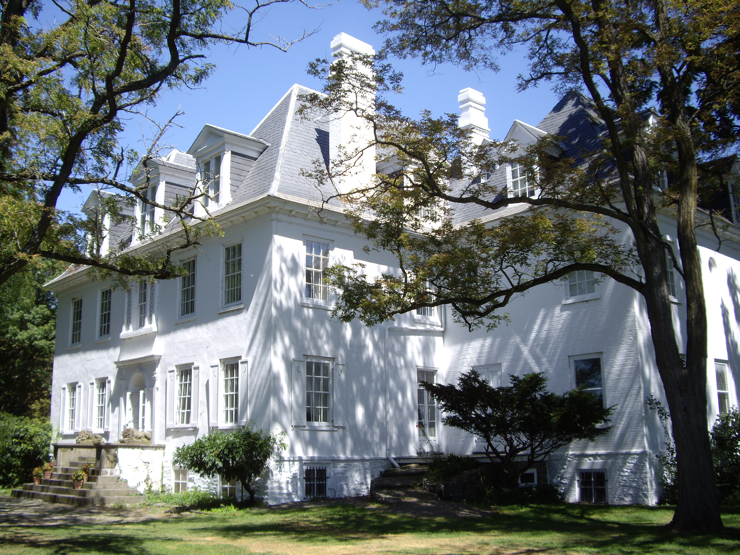

- Location within New York Location within the United States
- Interactive map showing the location of Clermont
- Location: One mile North of Tivoli, New York
- Coordinates: 42°05′09″N 73°55′10″W
- Built: 1782
- Architectural style: Georgian
- Part of: Hudson River Historic District (ID90002219)
- NRHP reference No.: 71000535

Significant dates
- Added to NRHP: February 18, 1971
- Designated NHL: November 28, 1972
- Designated NHLDCP: December 14, 1990

The Clermont State Historic Site, also known as the Clermont estate, the Clermont Manor or just Clermont, is a New York State Historic Site in southwestern Columbia County, New York, United States. It protects the former estate of the Livingston family, seven generations of whom lived on the site over more than two centuries.

== History ==
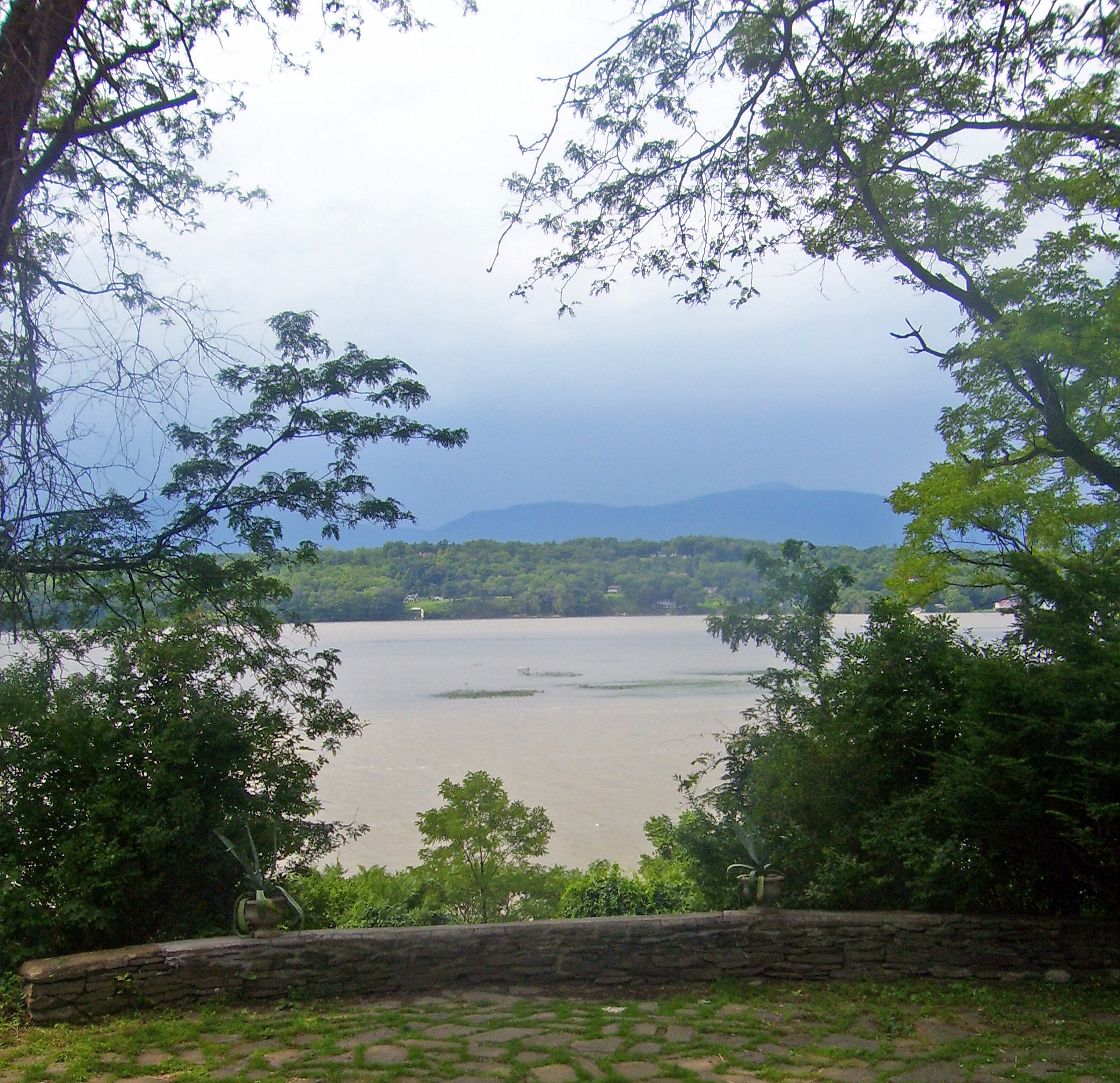
View of the Catskill Mountains and Hudson River from the estate

The name Clermont derives from "clear mountain" in French and was inspired by the view of the Catskill Mountains across the Hudson River from the estate.

The estate was established by Robert Livingston of the famous Livingston family following the death of his father, the first Lord of Livingston Manor, in 1728; while most of the manor was inherited by the eldest son Philip Livingston, 13,000 acres (5,300 ha) in the southwest corner, later named Clermont, was willed to Robert. The original house was built about 1740.

Robert Livingston of Clermont died on June 27, 1775, and the estate passed to his son, Robert, who was known as 'Judge Livingston' to distinguish him from his father. Judge Livingston was a member of the New York General Assembly from 1759 to 1768, served as judge of the admiralty court from 1760 to 1763 and was a delegate to the Stamp Act Congress of 1765. He married Margaret Beekman, daughter of Colonel Henry Beekman. Their son, Robert R. Livingston, later known as "Chancellor", was a Founding Father of the United States and served on the Committee of Five that drafted the United States Declaration of Independence. Judge Robert died about six months after his father, on December 9, 1775.

=== Burning and rebuilding ===
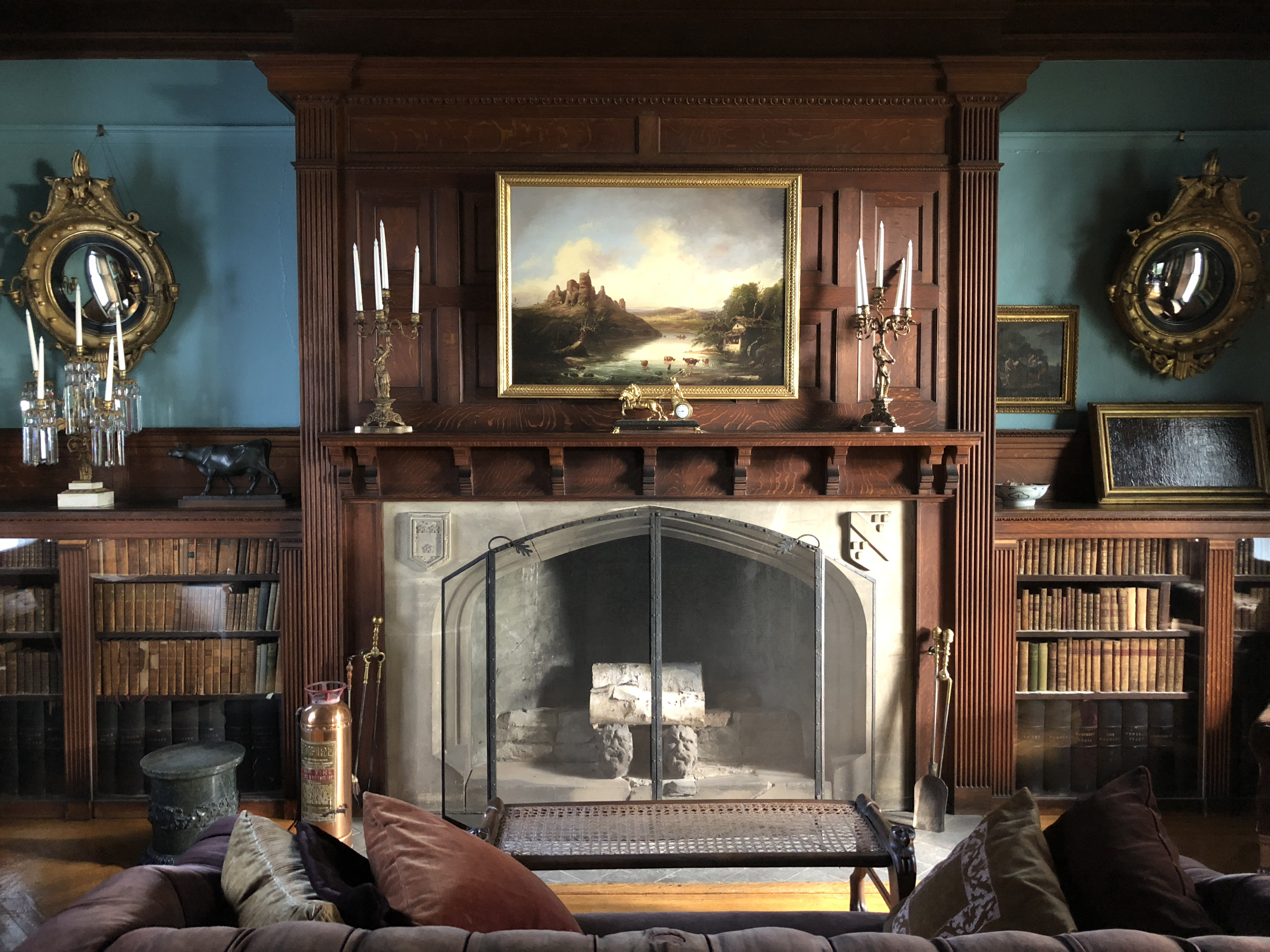
John Henry Livingston's living room.

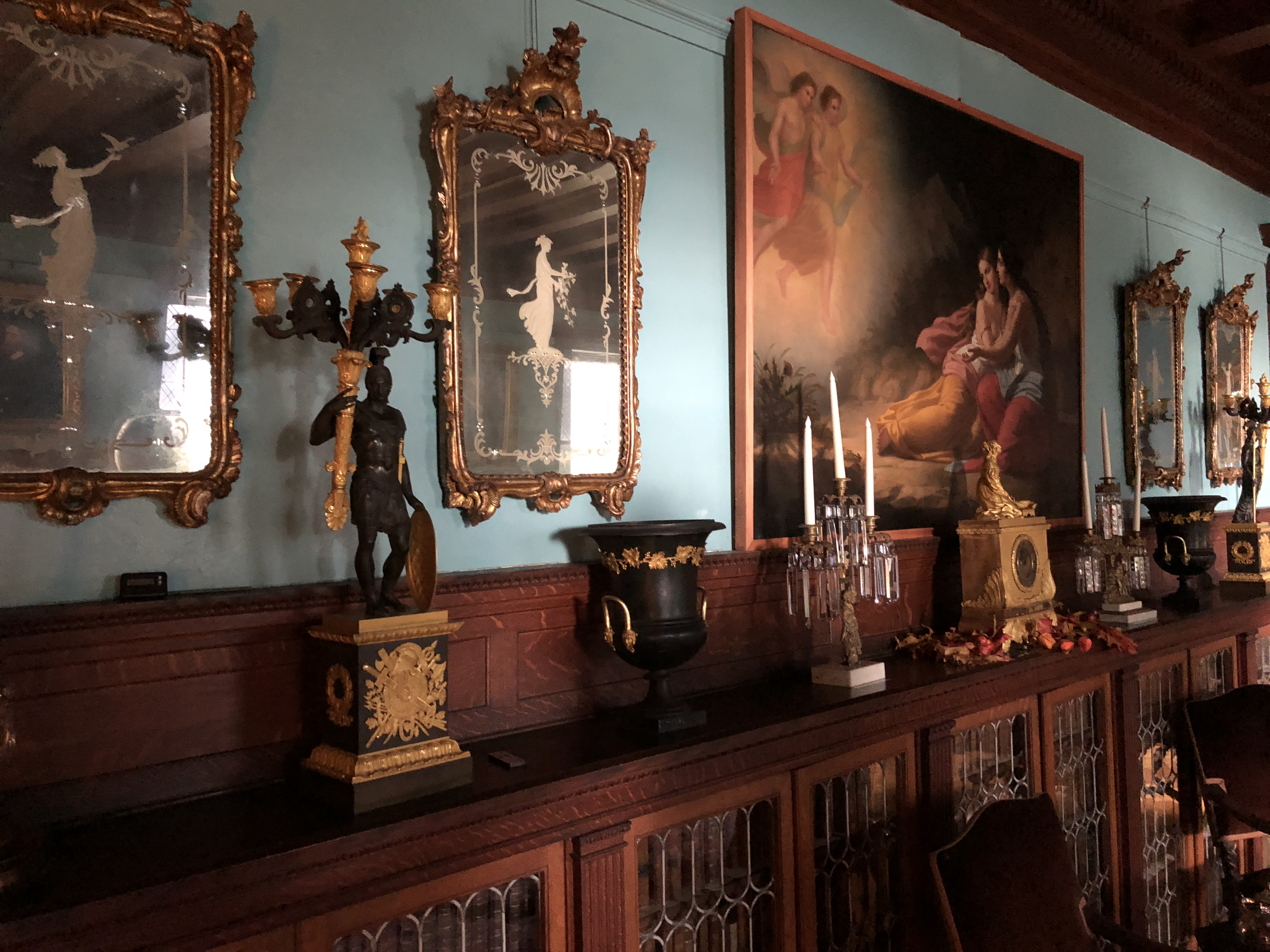
Another view of John Henry Livingston's living room.

In October 1777, British ships sailed upriver from New York City in support of General John Burgoyne who was north of Albany. That same force had already stormed two forts in the Hudson Highlands and burned Kingston, New York. Major General John Vaughan led a raiding party to Clermont and burned Livingston's home because of the family's role in the rebellion. Margaret Beekman Livingston rebuilt the family home between 1779 and 1782.

Robert R. Livingston became the estate's most prominent resident. Chancellor Livingston administered the oath of office to President George Washington, became Secretary of Foreign Affairs, and negotiated the Louisiana Purchase.

In 1793, Robert Livingston built a second mansion on the property, confusingly named "Clermont", which subsequently became known as both "Arryl House" and "Idele", which burned in 1909. The ruins of that house are still visible at the south end of the property.

He also partnered with Robert Fulton in 1807, to create the first commercially successful steamboat, the North River Steamboat, later known as the Clermont, which stopped at the house on its inaugural trip.

The home's final Livingston owners were John Henry Livingston and his wife Alice. They added to the home and greatly valued the home's important historical role.

Alice Livingston was responsible for creating many of the landscaped gardens that are continued to this day. Following John Henry's death, Alice turned the mansion and property over to the state in 1962 so that all the people of New York could experience it.

=== Present day ===
The house is now a New York State Historic Site and was designated a U.S. National Historic Landmark in 1972. It is a contributing property to a National Historic Landmark District, the Hudson River Historic District.

Although located in the town of Clermont, its mailing address is in the nearby town of Germantown.

== See also ==
- List of National Historic Landmarks in New York
- List of New York State Historic Sites
- National Register of Historic Places listings in Columbia County, New York
