= Gerardus Beekman =

American politician

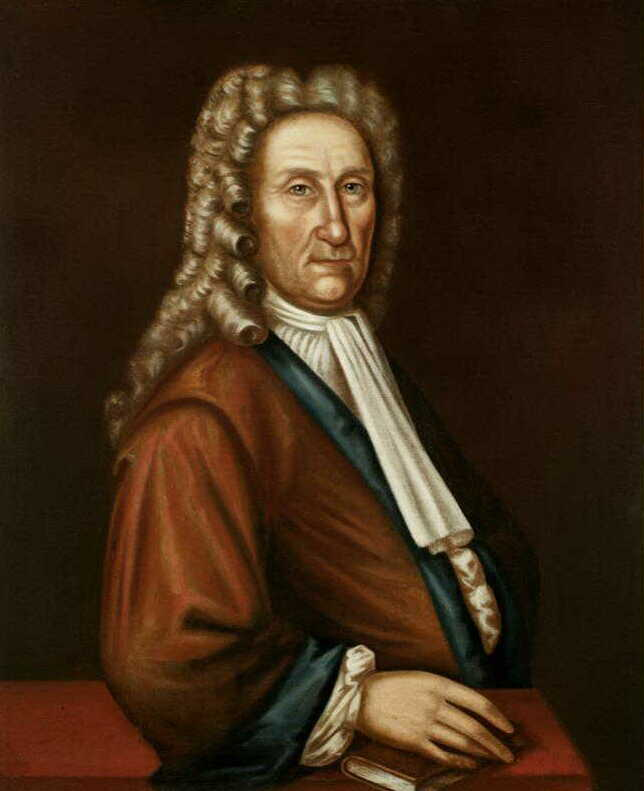
- Portrait of Beekman

Governor of the Province of New York Acting
- In office April 10, 1710 – June 14, 1710
- Monarch: Anne
- Preceded by: Richard Ingoldesby (acting)
- Succeeded by: Robert Hunter

Personal details
- Born: Gerardus Willemse Beekman; August 1653 New Netherland
- Died: October 10, 1723 (aged 70) New York City, Province of New York
- Spouse: Magdalena Abeel (m. 1677)
- Relations: Hendrick Beekman (brother); Henry Beekman (nephew)
- Parent(s): Wilhelmus H. Beekman; Catalina De Boogh
- Profession: Physician and Acting Governor of New York

Gerardus Willemse Beekman (c. August 1653 – October 10, 1723) was a wealthy physician, land owner, and colonial governor of the Province of New York.

== Early life ==
He was christened August 17, 1653 at Corlaer's Hook Plantation, New York, the second son of Wilhelmus Hendricksen Beekman (1623–1707) and Catalina De Boogh. His father was a Dutch immigrant who came to New Amsterdam from the Netherlands on the same vessel as Peter Stuyvesant. Wilhelmus soon became Treasurer of the Dutch West India Company and later became the Mayor of New York City, Governor of Delaware from 1653 to 1664, and Governor of Pennsylvania from 1658 to 1663. His elder brother was Hendrick Beekman.

== Career ==
In 1681, he was captain of militia at Flatbush, and in 1689, he was appointed Major of all the horse and foot in Kings County.

From 1690 to 1691, he was a member of Jacob Leisler's Council and government, which led to what is known as Leisler's Rebellion, which led to the overthrow of the government of colonial governor Francis Nicholson after the accession of William of Orange. When Henry Sloughter came to America in 1691 as Deputy Governor to succeed Nicholson, Beekman was arrested along with Leisler and others. Beekman served 17 months in prison, but was pardoned afterward, unlike Leisler, who was hanged. Gov. Benjamin Fletcher, who succeeded Sloughter, was succeeded by Richard Coote. In 1700, Beekman was appointed Lieutenant-Colonel, and then Colonel, under the Earl of Bellomont.

After Bellomont died in 1701, Viscount Cornbury was appointed as his successor and began his administration on May 3, 1702. His advising Council consisted of: Beekman, William Atwood, William Smith, Peter Schuyler, Abraham de Peyster, Samuel Staats, Robert Walters, Sampson Shelton Broughton, Wolfgang William Romer, William Lawrence, and Rip Van Dam.

In 1710, he was elected President of the Council and Acting Governor of the Province of New York. He remained Governor until the arrival of Robert Hunter, from April 10, 1710 to June 14, 1710.

=== Real estate ===
In addition to his estate in Flatbush, Beekman owned three large farms in the Province of New Jersey. One farm extended for two miles along the Raritan River and contained 1,800 acres, held jointly with Laford Paterson, also of Flatbush, that was purchased for £366. Another farm of 4,000 acres in Somerset County, New Jersey, was purchased in 1702 from Thomas Hart of England, one of the 24 Proprietors of East Jersey, through his attorney, Rip Van Dam. The third farm was 608 acres on the Millstone River. His sons Christopher, Adrian, and William latet became the owners of large tracts of these lands.

== Personal life ==
On August 29, 1677, he married Magdalena Abeel (c. 1662–1745), the eldest daughter of Christopher Janse Abeel (1621–1684) and Neeltje Jans Kroom. Magdalena's brother was Johannes Abeel (1667–1711), the second mayor of Albany. Together they had:

- Divertje "Deborah" Beekman (1674–1737), who married Theunis Hendricksen Wiltse (1674–1741)
- William Beekman (b. 1679), who died young.
- Christopher Beekman (1681–1724), who married Maria DeLanoy (1681–1726), a daughter of Abraham Delanoy (1642–1702) and Cornelia Jacobse Toll.
- Dr. William Beekman (1684–1770), who married Catharine Delanoy (1691–1765); though educated in medicine, he had a successful mercantile career.
- Adrian Beekman (1682–1705), who married Aletta Lispenard (c. 1686–1705), relative of Leonard Lispenard
- Gerard Beekman (1693–1746), who married Anna Maria van Horne (1696-1726)
- Catherine Beekman

He died in New York City October 10, 1723.

=== Descendants ===
His grandson, Gerardus Christopher Beekman (died 1778), married Catharine Van Dyke (born 1708), the daughter of John Van Dyke, granddaughter of Jan Janse Van Dyke, and great-granddaughter of Jan Thomasse Van Dyke, who came from Amsterdam in 1652 and is considered to be the progenitor of the Van Dyke family in America.

He was the grandfather of James Beekman (1732-1807) the owner of Mount Pleasant, a mansion on Manhattan that was requisitioned by the British Army during the Revolution. The location of this property is the current Beekman Place. The fireplace mantle of the mansion, which features the Beekman family coat of arms, can be seen at the New York Historical Society.

He is also an ancestor of cartoonist Garretson Beekman Trudeau (born 1948).

Government offices
Preceded by Richard Ingoldesby	Governor of the Province of New York; Acting; 1710	Succeeded by Robert Hunter
