= Gilbert Livingston (legislator) =

American lawyer and legislator

Gilbert Livingston (December 17, 1742 – September 14, 1806) was a lawyer who, in 1788, served as a delegate to the Poughkeepsie Convention where, despite having arrived at the convention as an Anti-Federalist, he ultimately voted to ratify the United States Constitution. Both before and after that ratification convention, he served in the New York Assembly, representing Dutchess County. Livingston had also been a member of the New York Provincial Congress.

== Early life ==
Gilbert was one of the thirteen children of Henry Livingston, Sr. and Susanna Conklin Livingston. Gilbert's father, Henry, was County Clerk in Dutchess County, as well as a legislator in colonial New York. They were members of a less affluent branch of the prominent Livingston family of New York. One of Gilbert's great-grandfathers was the wealthy New York colonial official Robert Livingston the Elder, and one of Gilbert's siblings was the poet Henry Livingston, Jr.

Gilbert was born and grew up near Poughkeepsie, and went to school in Fishkill, New York. He then went to King's College, which was the colonial-era name of Columbia College (New York), but left early (in 1757) due to a smallpox epidemic. Official records indicate that he was matriculated with the class of 1760.

== Career ==
Livingston practiced law, owned a small farm with a few tenants, and ran a store in Poughkeepsie with the brother of prominent politician Melancton Smith. His law partners included the renowned jurist James Kent as well as Smith Thompson, who later married Livingston's daughter Sarah.

In 1775, Livingston served in the New York Provincial Congress. During the American Revolution, he was a patriot, and worked in shipbuilding with his brother-in-law Peter Tappan, who happened to be the brother-in-law of Governor George Clinton. Livingston chaired an important wartime committee for Governor Clinton that dealt with the problem of inflation. Serving in the New York State Assembly from 1777-1778 and 1788-1789, he opposed price-fixing, supported tenants' rights, and warned against attempts by loyalists to gain power. He also was a judicial official called a "surrogate" from 1778 to 1785, and again from 1787 to 1794.

=== New York ratification convention ===
Livingston is now remembered most for his participation in the critical state convention, held in Poughkeepsie during the summer of 1788, that ratified the U.S. Constitution. The state convention in Poughskeepsie in June 1788 pitted Alexander Hamilton, John Jay, James Duane, Robert Livingston, and Richard Morris against the Clintonian faction led by Melancton Smith, John Lansing, Abraham Yates, and Gilbert Livingston.

Hamilton's faction were against any conditional ratification, under the impression that New York would not be accepted into the Union, while Clinton's faction wanted to amend the Constitution, while maintaining the state's right to secede if their attempts failed. During the state convention, New Hampshire and Virginia became the ninth and tenth states to ratify the Constitution, respectively, which made any adjournment unlikely, and increased the odds of a compromise.

During the debates in Poughkeepsie, Livingston expressed great skepticism about giving so much power to a federal government. He said that members of the U.S. Senate would be "strangers to the condition of the common people," and that a state government would be sufficient to deal with the "depravity of human nature." As to the power of the U.S. Senate to block treaties, Livingston took the position that Congress could get around the Senate as long as the treaty did not commit the United States for "a longer time" than the two-year duration of Congress.

Livingston said he would only support ratification if amendments were made: "I will steadily persevere, in every possible means, to secure this desirable object, a revision of the Constitution." Ultimately, he voted for ratification, confident that the desired amendments would eventually be approved. The vote in Poughkeepsie was thirty (30) to twenty-seven (27), which was the closest ratification vote of any state, with many delegates reluctant to break with Governor Clinton (who opposed ratification). Livingston called his vote to ratify the most difficult political decision of his life, and he later felt vindicated once a bill of rights was proposed by Congress and ratified by the states.

=== Slavery ===
Livingston openly opposed slavery, and joined the Poughkeepsie branch of the New York Manumission Society in 1787. However, he was a longtime slave owner, like many of his Livingston relatives. He expressed his mixed feelings towards the institution in letters to his family, expressing his desire to free his own slaves, his own “principles with respect to their natural right to Freedom which i [he] suppose[d] all possess”, while simultaneously speaking to his financial dependence on them.

== Personal life ==
In 1763, he married Catherine Crannell (1745–1830), the daughter of law partner Bartholomew Crannell and Tryntje Van Kleeck. Gilbert and Catherine had one child:

- Sarah Livingston (1777–1833), who married Smith Thompson (1768–1843), a law partner of Gilbert and later the U.S. Secretary of the Navy and Associate Justice of the U.S. Supreme Court. After her death, he married Elizabeth Davenport Livingston (1805–1886), her cousin and the daughter of Gilbert's brother, Henry Livingston Jr.

Livingston died on September 14, 1806.
