= Livingston Manor =

Land in the Province of New York granted to Robert Livingston the Elder

Livingston Manor was a 160,000-acre (65,000 ha) tract of land in the Province of New York granted to Robert Livingston the Elder during the reign of George I of Great Britain. Located between the Hudson River and the Massachusetts border, the Livingston Manor was located in an area that later became a portion of Columbia County in the state of New York.

== History ==
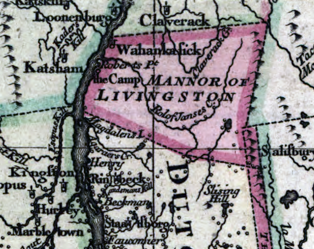
Map of Livingston Manor in 1777

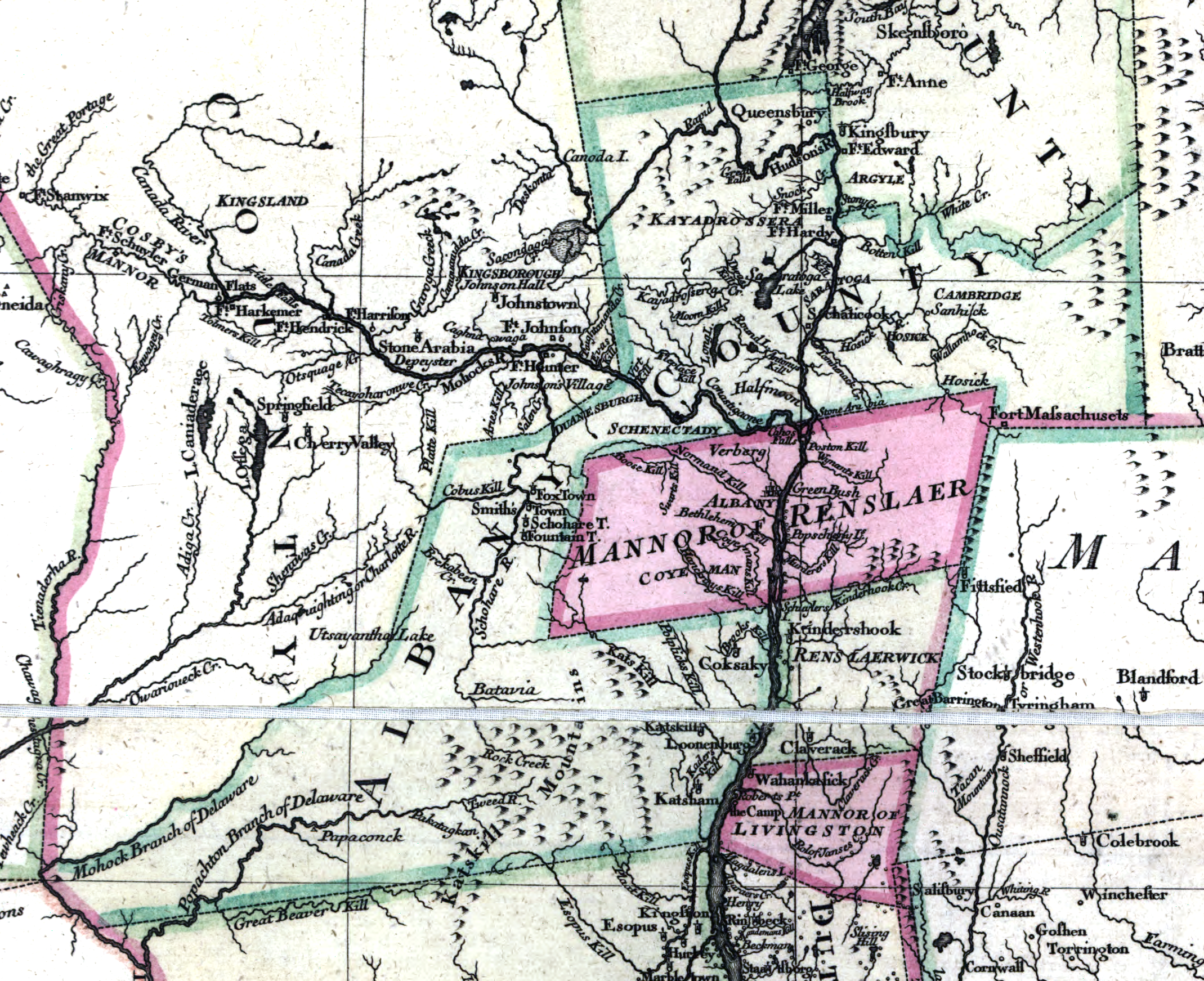
Map of Livingston Manor and Rensselaerwyck in 1777

The roots of Livingston Manor lie in a patent obtained in July 1686 by Robert Livingston the Elder for land he had previously acquired from the resident Native Americans in the colonial Province of New York. The Manor itself was a 160,000-acre (65,000 ha) tract of land patented by Livingston through the influence of 5th Governor Thomas Dongan, and confirmed by royal charter of George I of Great Britain in 1715, creating the manor and lordship of Livingston.

Livingston Manor was located between the Hudson River on the west and the Massachusetts border on the east, approximately 20 miles wide and approximately 12 miles long north to south. The Manor encompassed the area that would later become the towns of Livingston, Germantown, Clermont, Taghkanic, Gallatin, Copake, and Ancram, located in Columbia County, New York.

The lords of the manor were:

- Robert Livingston the Elder (1654–1728), served from 1715 to 1728.
- Philip Livingston (1686–1749), served from 1728 to 1749.
- Robert Livingston (1708–1790), served from 1749 to 1790.

Although an English-deeded tract, some sources list Livingston Manor with the patroonships of New Netherland.

=== Division of land ===
The first division of the estate occurred in 1728 upon the death of Robert Livingston the Elder, who stipulated that his third son, Robert Livingston (1718–1775), be granted 13,000 acres (5,300 ha) from Livingston Manor's southwest corner, a tract which Robert christened Clermont Manor.

In 1790, upon the death of the last lord of the manor, Robert Livingston, the remainder of Livingston Manor was divided among the heirs of his four youngest sons, rather than continuing to pass down through primogeniture. Robert's eldest living son, Peter R. Livingston (1737–1809), had made many unwise financial decisions and was perennially in debt, and it was feared the estate would end up claimed by his creditors were it passed on to him.

The inheritors of the estate were all men who had distinguished themselves considerably during and after the American Revolution:

- Philip Livingston (1716–1778), delegate to the Continental Congress and signatory of the United States Declaration of Independence
- William Livingston (1723–1790), 1st Governor of New Jersey and signatory of the United States Constitution
- William Alexander (1726–1783), a brother-in-law who had married Sarah Livingston (1725–1805), the daughter of Philip Livingston, 2nd Lord of Livingston Manor, and Robert’s sister. Alexander had been a major general in the Continental Army during the American Revolutionary War
- James Duane (1733–1797), a son-in-law and Robert’s former ward, who had married his daughter Mary (1738–1821). Duane had been a delegate to the Continental Congress, 44th Mayor of New York City, and signatory of the Articles of Confederation

The land was divided among the families of these four men, and the power of the Livingston family was slowly diminished. A portion of the estate is still held by the family. The town of Livingston, New York occupies part of the original tract.

== See also ==
- John Livingstone
