= Charles DeWitt Bruyn =

American politician

Member of the New York State Assembly for Sullivan and Ulster Counties
- In office July 1, 1821 – December 31, 1822

Personal details
- Born: December 12, 1784 Shawangunk, New York
- Died: February 9, 1849 (aged 64) Shawangunk, New York
- Party: Federalist/Clintonian
- Spouse: Maria Hasbrouck (m. 1816–1849)
- Relations: Charles DeWitt (grandfather); Jacobus Bruyn (grandfather); Andrew DeWitt Bruyn (cousin); Charles G. DeWitt (cousin)
- Parent(s): Johannes Bruyn; Margaret DeWitt Bruyn

Charles DeWitt Bruyn (December 12, 1784 – February 9, 1849) was an American politician from Ulster County, New York.

== Early life ==
Bruyn was born on December 12, 1784, in Shawangunk, Ulster County, New York. He was a son of Johannes Bruyn (1750–1814) and Margaret (née DeWitt) Bruyn (1758–1827).

His maternal grandparents were Blandina (née DuBois) DeWitt and Col. Charles DeWitt, who served as a delegate to the Continental Congress. Through his uncle Gerrit DeWitt and his wife, Catharine (née Ten Eyck) DeWitt, he was a first cousin of Charles G. DeWitt, a U.S. Representative who was appointed the U.S. Chargé d'Affaires to Guatemala by Andrew Jackson. His aunt, Maria "Polly" DeWitt, was the wife of Jacobus "James" Hasbrouck, a prominent Kingston merchant. His paternal grandparents were, and Jacobus Bruyn, who served as a member of the New York General Assembly from Ulster County from 1759 to 1768. He was also a nephew of Assemblyman Jacobus S. Bruyn, Severyn Tenhout Bruyn and Cornelius Bruyn. Through his uncle Jacobus, he was a first cousin of U.S. Representative Andrew DeWitt Bruyn.

== Career ==
A farmer by occupation, "he was a man of good mind, and well read in the current topics of his time. He was a useful citizen, and engaged in general conveyancing and surveying, as his father had before him. He was influential and active in politics; as a member of the Whig party was appointed Sheriff of Ulster County in 1812, and again in 1815."

Bruyn was a Federalist/Clintonian member of New York State Assembly from Sullivan and Ulster counties from 1821 to 1822. He also served as postmaster.

== Personal life ==
In 1816, Bruyn was married to his first cousin, Maria Hasbrouck (1793–1851), a daughter of James Hasbrouck and Polly (née DeWitt) Hasbrouck. Together, they were the parents of four children:

- Mary Bruyn (1818–1867)
- Johannes "John" Bruyn (1820–1862), a Yale educated lawyer who practiced in Kingston.
- Margaret Bruyn
- Charles DeWitt Bruyn (1834–1896), who was educated at the Kingston Academy and succeeded his uncle Cornelius as president of the State of New York Bank in 1873; he married Jessie Butters, a daughter of Archibald Butters of New York City.

Bruyn died on February 9, 1849, in Shawangunk and was buried at the Bruynswick Rural Cemetery in Bruynswick, New York.
