= Jacobus Bruyn =

American politician

Member of the New York General Assembly from Ulster County
- In office 1759–1768
- Preceded by: Johannes Jansen
- Succeeded by: George Clinton

Personal details
- Born: January 7, 1707 Wallkill, Province of New York, British America
- Died: April 26, 1781 (aged 74) Wallkill, New York, U.S.
- Spouse: Jane Graham (died 1764)
- Relations: Andrew DeWitt Bruyn (grandson); Charles DeWitt Bruyn (grandson)
- Parent(s): Jacobus Bruyn; Tryntje Schoonmaker

Jacobus Bruyn (January 7, 1707 – April 26, 1781) was a member of the New York General Assembly from Ulster County from 1759 to 1768.

== Early life ==
Bruyn was born on January 7, 1707, in Wallkill in the Province of New York in what was then a part of British America. He was a son of Jacobus Bruyn and Tryntje Schoonmaker. Among his siblings was Hanna Bruyn, who married Solomon van Wagenen.

His paternal grandparents were Jacob Bruyn, a native of Norway, and Gertrude Esselsteyn (a daughter of Jan Willemse Esselsteyne). His maternal grandparents were Jochem Hendrickse Schoonmaker and Petronella Sleght (daughter of Cornelius Barentse Sleght).

== Career ==
Bruyn served as a member of the New York General Assembly from Ulster County from 1759 to 1768. Bruyn was succeeded by George Clinton, who later served as the 1st Governor of the State of New York and the 4th Vice President of the United States.

During the American Revolutionary War, Bruyn was a Corp. of the Foot Company of Militia of the "Presenk of the Highland" under command of Capt. Thomas Ellison.

== Personal life ==
Bruyn was married to Jane Graham (d. 1764). Together, they were the parents of at least four boys, all of whom served in the New York State Assembly:

- Gertruyd Bruyn (b. 1748), who married Cornelius DuBois, a son of Cornelius DuBois and Anna Margrietjen Hoogteling.
- Jacobus S. Bruyn (1749–1823), a New York Assemblymen from Ulster County from 1797 to 1799 and a member of New York State Senate from 1800 to 1805; who married Jenneke DeWitt, a daughter of Andries J. DeWitt and Blandina Elmendorf (née Ten Eyck) DeWitt.
- Severyn Tenhout Bruyn (1749–1794), a New York Assemblymen from Ulster County from 1789 to 1790 again from 1792 to 1793 and, lastly, from 1794 until his death; he married Margaret Anderson of New York.
- Johannes Bruyn (1750–1814), New York Assemblymen from Ulster County from 1781 to 1783 again from 1796 to 1797 and, lastly, from 1799 to 1800. He was a presidential elector for New York in 1792 and a member of New York State Senate from 1809 to 1813; he married Margrietje "Margaret" DeWitt, a daughter of Col. Charles DeWitt and Blandina DuBois. Margaret was the aunt of U.S. Representative Charles G. DeWitt.
- Mary Bruyn (b. 1752), who married Nicholas Hardenberg, a son of Abraham Hardenberg and Marytje Roosa, in 1775.
- Cornelius Bruyn (1756–1815), a New York Assemblymen from Ulster County from 1793 to 1794; who died unmarried.

His wife died April 19, 1764. Bruyn died on April 26, 1781, in Wallkill.

=== Descendants ===
Through his son Jacobus, he was a grandfather of Andrew DeWitt Bruyn (1790–1838), a New York Assemblymen in 1818; trustee of Ithaca in 1821 and president of the village in 1822, and a U.S. Representative from New York for the 22nd District from 1837 to 1838.

Through his son Johannes, he was a grandfather of Charles DeWitt Bruyn (1784–1849), a New York Assemblymen from Sullivan and Ulster counties from 1821 to 1822.
