= Judge Jenkins =

Judge Jenkins may refer to:

- Alexander M. Jenkins (1802–1864), circuit judge for the Third Judicial Circuit of Illinois
- Bruce Sterling Jenkins (1927–2023), judge of the United States District Court for the District of Utah
- Charles E. Jenkins (died 1896), judge of the Milwaukee County, Wisconsin Court
- Clay Jenkins (born 1964), county judge for Dallas County, Texas
- David Jenkins (Royalist) (1582–1663), judge of the Carmarthen circuit of the court of great sessions of Wales
- Elizabeth Jenkins (judge) (born 1950), U.S. magistrate judge for the Middle District of Florida
- James Graham Jenkins (1834–1921), judge of the United States Court of Appeals for the Seventh Circuit
- John J. Jenkins (1843–1911), judge of the United States District Court for the District of Puerto Rico
- Lindsay C. Jenkins (born 1977), judge of the United States District Court for the Northern District of Illinois
- Martin Jenkins (born 1953), judge of the United States District Court for the Northern District of California, before serving on the Supreme Court of California

== See also ==
- Justice Jenkins (disambiguation)
