= Hasbrouck =

Hasbrouck has multiple meanings:

== People ==
Hasbrouck, as a surname, may refer to:

- Abraham Bruyn Hasbrouck (1791–1879), U.S. Congressman from New York and president of Rutgers College
- Abraham J. Hasbrouck (1773–1845), U.S. Congressman from New York
- Josiah Hasbrouck (1755–1821), U.S. Representative from New York
- Kenny Hasbrouck (born 1986), American basketball player
- Louis Hasbrouck (1777–1834), New York politician
- Lydia Sayer Hasbrouck (1827–1910), American suffragist and women's dress reformer
- Sol Hasbrouck (1833–1906), American politician; mayor of Boise, Idaho
- William C. Hasbrouck (1800–1870), American lawyer and politician

== Places ==
- Hasbrouck Heights, New Jersey
- Hasbrouck House (disambiguation), the name of several historic houses

== See also ==
- Hasbrook, surname
