= Henry Richard DeWitt =

American politician

- Born: July 12, 1875; Spring Valley, New York
- Died: September 23, 1936 (aged 61); Wakefield, Massachusetts
- Education: Rutgers University
- Occupation: Lawyer
- Spouse: Charlotte Anderson Folant
- Parent(s): Richard DeWitt and Katharine Hammond
- Relatives: Charles DeWitt; Charles G. DeWitt; Ten Eyck family

Henry Richard DeWitt (July 12, 1875 - September 23, 1936) was a New York lawyer and politician. A member of the Republican Party, he served in the New York State Assembly from 1914 to 1916.

== Early life ==
Henry Richard DeWitt was born in Spring Valley, New York on July 12, 1875, the son of Richard DeWitt and Katharine Hammond. His father was a Dutch Reformed minister who served a number of congregations in New York until his death in 1901. Henry R. DeWitt's great-great-grandfather was the statesman Charles DeWitt, and his great-uncle was the congressman and diplomat Charles G. DeWitt. Through his father's side of the family, DeWitt was also a member of the Ten Eyck family and a relative of Simeon DeWitt and DeWitt Clinton. Henry R. DeWitt graduated from Rutgers University in 1898 and Albany Law School in 1900.

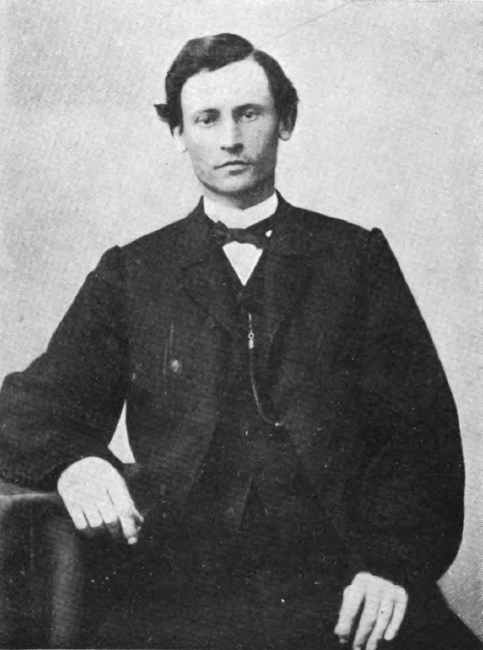
Henry DeWitt's father, the Reverend Richard DeWitt

== Career ==
DeWitt practiced law and served as the Deputy County Clerk in Ulster County, New York before running for elected office. Running as a member of the Republican Party, DeWitt was elected to the New York State Assembly for Ulster County's first district, defeating his Democratic Party opponent 4,937 votes to 4,680 votes. DeWitt was subsequently re-elected twice, serving in the assembly from 1914 to 1916. While an assemblyman, DeWitt was a member of the General Laws, Codes, Military Affairs, and Villages committees. After leaving office, DeWitt acted as the clerk for Ulster County's board of supervisors until 1921.

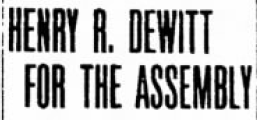
1915 Kingston Daily Freeman headline endorsing DeWitt

== Personal life ==
DeWitt married Charlotte Anderson Folant on October 16, 1907. They had one daughter, Natalie Sims DeWitt, who married Richard E. Luff.

Henry Richard DeWitt died in Wakefield, Massachusetts on September 23, 1936.

His father Richard (1839–1901) was the son of TenEyck DeWitt (1792–1883) and Antje "Ann" Crispell DeWitt (1796–1860). He had at least three siblings:

1. Elmore DeWitt (1865–1933), born at Guilford, just outside of Gardiner, New York
2. Mary DeWitt (1870–1965), born at Guilford
3. Anna Crispell DeWitt (1872–1914), born at Spring Valley; married William S. Eltinge (1874–1931), her 2nd cousin once removed through the Crispell family

Henry descends, aside from the DeWitt family, from many of the early Dutch settler families to Ulster County, New York, including the Brodhead, DuBois, Blanchan, Ten Eyck, Elmendorf, Kiersted, Wynkoop, Ten Broeck, Crispell, Newkirk, Roosa, Krom, Van Vliet, Hasbrouck, Deyo, Schoonmaker and Louw families. Some notable ancestors include Louis DuBois (Huguenot), one of the thirteen patentees or founders of New Paltz, New York; Claes Martenszen Roosevelt, ancestor of United States Presidents Theodore Roosevelt and Franklin D. Roosevelt; Antoine Crispell, another New Paltz patentee; Abraham Hasbrouck, another New Paltz patentee; and Christian Deyo, another New Paltz patentee.

New York State Assembly
Preceded by Lawrence J. Kenny	New York State Assembly; Ulster County, 1st District (with Abraham P. LeFevre); 1914-1916	Succeeded by Joel Brink
Preceded by Christopher K. Loughran	Clerk of the Ulster County Board of Supervisors; 1916-1933	Succeeded by Daniel Shaw
