= Andrew DeWitt Bruyn =

American politician

Andrew D. Bruyn
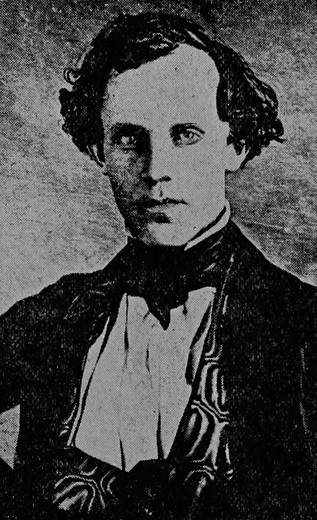

Member of the U.S. House of Representatives from New York's 22nd district
- In office March 4, 1837 – July 27, 1838
- Preceded by: Stephen B. Leonard
- Succeeded by: Cyrus Beers

Judge of Court of Common Pleas
- In office 1826–1836

Member of the New York State Assembly from Ulster County
- In office 1818–1818

Personal details
- Born: Andrew DeWitt Bruyn; November 18, 1790 Wawarsing, New York
- Died: July 27, 1838 (aged 47) Ithaca, New York
- Resting place: Ithaca City Cemetery
- Party: Democratic
- Spouse: Abigail Champlin
- Relations: Jacobus Bruyn (grandfather); Cynthia Morgan St. John (granddaughter)
- Parent(s): Jacobus S. Bruyn; Jenneke DeWitt Bruyn
- Education: Kingston Academy
- Alma mater: Princeton College
- Occupation: Lawyer

Andrew DeWitt Bruyn (November 18, 1790 – July 27, 1838) was an American lawyer, jurist, and politician who served as a U.S. representative from New York from 1837 to 1838.

== Early life ==
Bruyn was born in Wawarsing, New York on November 18, 1790. He was a son of Jenneke (née DeWitt) Bruyn and Jacobus S. Bruyn (1749–1823), a New York Assemblymen from Ulster County from 1797 to 1799 and a member of New York State Senate from 1800 to 1805.

He came from a large and politically prominent family that included uncles Severyn Tenhout Bruyn, a New York Assemblyman, Johannes Bruyn, a New York Assemblymen and member of New York State Senate, and Cornelius Bruyn, also a New York Assemblymen from Ulster County from 1793 to 1794. Through his uncle Johannes, he was a first cousin of Charles D. Bruyn, a New York Assemblymen from Sullivan and Ulster counties. His paternal grandfather, Jacobus Bruyn, had been a member of the New York General Assembly, the legislative body of the Province of New York, from 1759 to 1768. His maternal grandparents were Blandina Elmendorf Ten Eyck and Andries J. DeWitt, brother of Col. Charles DeWitt (both first cousin once removed of Charles Clinton, DeWitt Clinton, George Clinton, Jr. and Jacob Hasbrouck DeWitt).

He attended Kingston Academy, Kingston, New York, and was graduated from Princeton College in 1810. In 1811, Bruyn attend the Litchfield Law School and studied under Tapping Reeve.

== Career ==
He studied law, was admitted to the bar in 1814 and commenced practice in Ithaca. He was a Justice of the Peace in 1817 and served as first surrogate of Tompkins County 1817–1821. He served as member of the New York State Assembly in 1818. He was appointed trustee of Ithaca in 1821 and served as president of the village in 1822. He was an unsuccessful candidate for election to the New York State Senate in 1825. He became county supervisor in 1825 and was made treasurer of the village 1826–1828. He served as judge of the Court of Common Pleas 1826–1836. He served as a director of the Ithaca and Owego Railroad in 1828. He was also interested in banking. He was a presidential elector in the 1828 presidential election.

=== Congress ===
Bruyn was elected as a Democrat to the Twenty-fifth Congress and served from March 4, 1837, until his death the following year in 1838.

== Personal life ==
Bruyn was married to Abigail Champlin (1802–1892). Together, they were the parents of eight children, including:

- Jane J. Bruyn (1820–1906), who married Alexander McCalla Mann (d. 1893).
- William Van Ness Bruyn (1823–1886), who married Sarah McCormick (1828–1855)
- Hannah M. Bruyn (1825–1896), who married Amasa Byron Dana (1819–1887).
- Matilda Bruyn (1827–1832), who died young.
- Dewitt C. Bruyn (1830–1909), a Confederate soldier who was a noted Savannah and Atlanta architect who designed the William Kehoe House.
- Ann Bruyn (1833–1910), who married Dr. Edward Jay Morgan Sr. (1825–1894)
- Joshua Champlin Bruyn (1835–1901), a Confederate soldier with the Oglethorpe Light Infantry who was a prisoner-of-war at Fort Delaware.

== Death and burial ==
Bruyn died in Ithaca on July 27, 1838. He was interred in Ithaca City Cemetery. His widow lived for another 54 years until her death in 1892.

== See also ==
- List of members of the United States Congress who died in office (1790–1899)

U.S. House of Representatives
Preceded by Stephen B. Leonard	Member of the U.S. House of Representatives from New York's 22nd congressional district 1837–1838	Succeeded by Cyrus Beers
