= Rapelje =

Rapelje may refer to:

- Rapelje, Montana, U.S.
- Joris Jansen Rapelje (1604–1663), a member of the Council of Twelve Men in the Dutch West India Company colony of New Netherland
- Sarah Rapelje (1625–1685), the first European Christian female born in New Netherland and the daughter of Joris Jansen Rapelje

== See also ==
- Rapalje (disambiguation)
