= Hasbrouck House =

Hasbrouck House may refer to:

- Stow-Hasbrouck House, a National Register of Historic Places listing in Calhoun County, Michigan
- Josiah Hasbrouck House, a house in Locust Lawn Estate in Gardiner, New York
- Abraham Hasbrouck House in the Huguenot Street Historic District in New Paltz, New York
- Maj. Jacob Hasbrouck Jr. House in the Huguenot Street Historic District in New Paltz, New York
- Jean Hasbrouck House, a National Historic Landmark in the Huguenot Street Historic District in New Paltz, New York
- Washington's Headquarters State Historic Site or Hasbrouck House, a National Historic Landmark in Newburgh, New York
- Hasbrouck House (Poughkeepsie, New York), a Romanesque home
