= Elizabeth Jenkins =

Elizabeth Jenkins may refer to:

- Elizabeth Jenkins (writer) (1905–2010), British novelist
- Elizabeth Jenkins (judge) (born 1950), United States federal magistrate judge

== See also ==
- Jenkins (name)
