= Jauncey =

Jauncey is a surname. Notable people with the surname include:

- Charles Jauncey, Baron Jauncey of Tullichettle (1925–2007), British judge and advocate
- James Jauncey Jr., (died 1790), Bermudian ship captain, merchant, and loyalist
- Josh Jauncey (born 1993), English-born Canadian kickboxer
