= New York General Assembly =

Former legislature of the province of New York

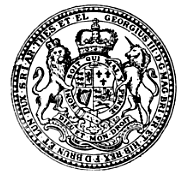

Type
- Type: Lower house
- Term limits: None

History
- Founded: October 17, 1683
- Disbanded: April 3, 1775
- Succeeded by: New York Provincial Congress

Leadership
- Speaker: Speaker of the New York General Assembly

Structure
- Seats: 39
- Length of term: Varied
- Authority: Charter of Liberties and Privileges

The General Assembly of New York, commonly known internationally as the New York General Assembly, and domestically simply as General Assembly, was the supreme legislative body of the Province of New York during its period of proprietal colonialship and the legislative body of the Province during its period as a crown colony. It was the representative governing body in New York until April 3, 1775, when the Assembly disbanded after the outbreak of the Revolutionary War.

== Background ==
The New York General Assembly was first convened on October 17, 1683, during the governorship of Thomas Dongan, 2nd Earl of Limerick, which passed an act entitled "A Charter of Liberties" that decreed that the supreme legislative power under the Duke of York (later King James II) shall reside in a governor, council, and the people convened in general assembly; conferred upon the members of the assembly rights and privileges making them a body coequal to and independent of the English Parliament; established town, county, and general courts of justice; solemnly proclaimed the right of religious liberty; and passed acts enunciating certain constitutional liberties, e.g. taxes could be levied only by the people met in general assembly; right of suffrage; and no martial law or quartering of the soldiers without the consent of the inhabitants.

The Assembly grew to twenty-seven members, (Note: By 1775, thirty-nine Assemblymen represented sixteen districts made up of Counties and Manors.) elected by voice vote by the people once every seven years and the districts they represented. The representatives terms were originally at the will of the governor and new elections were ordered as it suited his interests. A law was passed that limited member's terms to three years, but it was annulled by King George III. The Septennial Act was passed in 1743, and remained in force till the revolution.

The highly contested election for an open seat in the General Assembly held on October 29, 1733, in Eastchester is one of the better known political events in colonial America. The first issue of John Peter Zenger's New York Weekly Journal carried a lengthy report on the famous election, producing one of the few complete accounts of a colonial election available to historians. Zenger's acquittal in a seditious libel case in 1735 is seen as a foundation of the free press in America.

The General Assembly elected a speaker from their own ranks, chose their own clerk, and published their own journal. The Assembly had the sole right of originating all laws granting appropriations of money, and, during Governor William Cosby's administration, which was defined by political struggles and is known as one of the most oppressive royal placeholders, they withheld his compensation in an attempt to bring him closer to their desires. Reportedly, "these quarrels had considerably subsided before the revolution; but they doubtless had an influence beneficial to liberty, by introducing political discussions, and imparting a knowledge of the tendencies of irresponsible power."

The General Assembly continued until May 1775. Among its last acts was the adoption of petitions to the king and Parliament of Great Britain, in which, while they "professed a warm attachment to the royal person and government, they solemnly protested against the aggressions that had for years been gaining upon the rights of the people, and expressed, quite as strongly as was then avowed by the patriots of the day, the sentiments advocated in the revolution."

== General Assembly ==
=== Districts ===
- Albany County: all of the region that is now northern and western New York.
- Cortlandt Manor (Note: Van Cortlandt Manor was originally a 86,000-acre (35,000 ha) tract granted as a Patent to Stephanus Van Cortlandt in 1697 by King William III, stretching from the Hudson River on the west to the first boundary line between the Province of New York and the Colony of Connecticut, on the east, twenty English miles in length by ten in width, in shape nearly a rectangular parallelogram, forming, "The Manor of Cortlandt.")
- Dutchess County: now Dutchess and Putnam counties.
- Kings County: the current Kings County; Brooklyn.
- Livingston Manor (Note: Livingston Manor was a 160,000 acre (650 square kilometres (250 sq mi)) tract of land granted to Robert Livingston the Elder and confirmed by royal charter of George I of Great Britain in 1715, creating the manor and lordship of Livingston. The original patent was obtained in July 1686.)
- New York County: the current New York County; Manhattan.
- Orange County: now Orange and Rockland counties.
- Queens County: now Queens and Nassau counties.
- Rensselaer Manor (Note: The Manor of Rensselaerwyck was, first, a Dutch patroonship and, later, an English manor. The estate was originally deeded by the Dutch West India Company to merchant Kiliaen van Rensselaer in 1630. Rensselaerswyck extended for miles on each side of the Hudson River near present-day Albany. It included most of what are now the present New York counties of Albany and Rensselaer, as well as parts of Columbia and Greene counties.)
- Richmond County: the current Richmond County; Staten Island.
- Town of Schenectady
- Suffolk County: the current Suffolk County.
- Ulster County: now Ulster and Sullivan counties and part of what is now Delaware and Greene counties.
- Westchester County: now Westchester and Bronx counties.

=== Representatives ===
The following were elected as members of the General Assembly. (Note: No journals or records of names of members of general assembly, between 1683 and 1691, are preserved. The duration of office of members, previous to 1743, was unlimited and dependent upon the will of the governor; and this power of convening, proroguing and dissolving the assembly was frequently exercised to procure a compliance with the wishes of the executive.)

District	Representatives	Years	Notes
Albany	Jacob Coenraedt Ten Eyck	1747/8-50	Also served as mayor of Albany from 1748 to 1750.
Albany	Dirck Ten Broeck	1728	Also served as mayor of Albany from 1746 to 1748.
Albany	Dirck Wessels	1691–98, 1701	Also served as mayor of Albany from 1696 to 1698.
Albany	Evert Bancker	1702-5	Also served as mayor of Albany from 1695 to 1696 and 1707 to 1709.
Albany	Hans Hansen	1750-52	Also served as mayor of Albany from 1731 to 1732 and 1754 to 1756.
Albany	Hendrick Hansen	1699–1702, 1708–9, 1715–24	Also served as mayor of Albany from 1698 to 1699.
Albany	Jacob H. Ten Eyck	1759-77	Albany merchant who served as assistant alderman in the second ward from 1739 to 1743 and 1746 to 1748.
Albany	Jan Jansen Bleecker	1698-1701	Also served as mayor of Albany from 1700 to 1701.
Albany	Johannes Cuyler	1705–13, 1715–26, 1727–28	Also served as mayor of Albany from 1725 to 1726.
Albany	Johannes Schuyler	1710-13	Also served as mayor of Albany from 1703 to 1706.
Albany	John Abeel	1695–98, 1701-5	Also served as mayor of Albany from 1694 to 1695 and 1709 to 1710.
Albany	Johannes Bleecker Jr.	1701-6	Also served as recorder and mayor of Albany from 1701 to 1702. Son of Jan Jansen Bleecker.
Albany	Karl Hansen	1715-26	
Albany	Levinus Van Schaick	1691-93	A merchant who returned to Amsterdam and traded with Robert Livingston.
Albany	Myndert Schuyler	1701–10, 1713–15, 1724–37	Also served as mayor of Albany from 1719 to 1720 and 1723 to 1725.
Albany	Peter Douw	1747/8-50, 1752–59	
Albany	Peter Van Brugh	1713–15, 1727–28	Also served as mayor of Albany from 1699 to 1700 and 1721 to 1723.
Albany	Peter Van Bruggen	1705-8	
Albany	Peter Winne	1737–47, 1752–61	Winne ran a skipper along the Hudson River and was a partner in the Sacandaga Patent of 1741.
Albany	Philip Schuyler	1728–47, 1750–52	
Albany	Philip Schuyler	1768-77	A Revolutionary War general and, later, a U.S. senator and father-in-law of Alexander Hamilton.
Albany	Robert Livingston the Elder	1709-15	The 1st Lord of Livingston Manor.
Albany	Ryer Garretson	1726-27	
Albany	Ryer Jacobse Schermerhorn	1683-1702	The sole trustee of the Schenectady Patent.
Albany	Volkert P. Douw	1761-8?	Later served in the New York State Senate from 1785 to 1793. Son of Peter Douw.
Cortlandt Manor	Philip Verplanck	1737-64	Verplanck married into the Van Cortlandt family.
Cortlandt Manor	Pierre Van Cortlandt	1768-77	Also served as lieutenant governor of New York from 1777 to 1795.
Dutchess	Baltus Van Kleeck	1715-16	
Dutchess	Dirck Brinckerhoff	1768-77	Later served in the 2nd New York State Legislature.
Dutchess	Henry Beekman	1725-59	A grandson of acting New York City mayor Wilhelmus Beekman.
Dutchess	Henry Filkin	1752-58	
Dutchess	Henry Gilbert Livingston	1754-68	Father of Henry Livingston Jr., Gilbert Livingston, and John Henry Livingston.
Dutchess	Jacobus Tur Boss	1737-43	
Dutchess	Johannes Tappen	1743-51	
Dutchess	Johannes Turbosch	1716-25	
Dutchess	Johannes Van Kleeck	1726-37	
Dutchess	Leonard Van Kleeck	1768-77	
Dutchess	Leonard Lewis	1713-16	
Dutchess	Robert R. Livingston	1759-68	Known as "The Judge", only child of Robert Livingston of Clermont
Kings	Abraham Lott	1737-60	
Kings	Abraham Schenck	1759-68	
Kings	Coert Stuyvesant	1693-94	Likely a descendant of the last Dutch director of New Netherland, Peter Stuyvesant.
Kings	Cornelius Lott	1750-52	
Kings	Cornelius Sebring	1695–98, 1698-1726	
Kings	Cornelius Van Brunt	1698-1716	
Kings	D. Vander Vier	1750-59	
Kings	Gerardus Beekman	1698	Also served as acting governor of the Province of New York in 1710.
Kings	Henry Filkin	1693/4-95	One of the Great Nine Partners Patent.
Kings	Johannes Lott	1727–47, 1750–61	
Kings	Johannes Van Ecklen	1693-98	
Kings	John Poland	1691-93	
Kings	John Rapalje	1768-77	
Kings	Joseph Hagenan	1716	
Kings	Myndert Coerton	1698	
Kings	Nicholas Stillwell	1691-93	
Kings	Richard Stillwell	1725-27	
Kings	Samuel Garretson	1716-37	
Kings	Simon Boerum	1761-77	He represented New York in the Continental Congress in 1774 and 1775.
Livingston Manor
Livingston Manor	Robert Livingston the Elder	1716-26	The 1st Lord of Livingston Manor (he previously represented Albany from 1709 to 1715).
Livingston Manor	Robert Livingston	1726-28	Also known as "Robert of Clermont", second son of Robert Livingston the Elder and father of Robert Livingston.
Livingston Manor	Gilbert Livingston	1728-37	Fourth son of Robert Livingston the Elder who married Cornelia Beekman, granddaughter of Wilhelmus Beekman.
Livingston Manor	Robert Livingston	1737-59	The 3rd Lord of Livingston Manor; grandson of Robert Livingston the Elder and son of Philip Livingston.
Livingston Manor	William Livingston	1759-61	Later served as the 1st governor of New Jersey.
Livingston Manor	Peter R. Livingston	1761-69	Son of Robert Livingston, 3rd Lord of Livingston Manor.
Livingston Manor	Philip Livingston	1769-77	A merchant who was a delegate to the Continental Congress, and signed the Declaration of Independence.
New York
New York	Johannes Hardenbroek	1709-10	A merchant.
New York	Abraham Gouverneur	1701-2	Speaker of the Assembly from 1699 to 1702.
New York	Adolph Philipse	1726-45	The second son of Frederick Philipse, the 1st Lord of the Philipsburg Manor.
New York	Anthony Rutgers	1726-37	Related to Henry Rutgers.
New York	Brandt Schuyler	1695-98	Brother of Pieter Schuyler and Arent Schuyler
New York	Capt. Wilson	1709-10	
New York	Cornelius Van Horne	1743-59	
New York	David Clarkson	1739, 1745–52	
New York	David Provost	1699–1702, 1711–13, 1716–25	Also served as 24th mayor of New York City from 1699 to 1700.
New York	Garret Van Horne	1716-37	
New York	Henry Cruger	1745-59	Eldest son of 38th mayor of New York City John Cruger and brother of Speaker John Cruger Jr.
New York	Isaac De Rimier	1668-77	
New York	Jacobus Van Cortlandt	1691–93, 1698–99, 1702–16	Also served as 30th and 33rd mayor of New York City from 1710 to 1711 and 1719–1720.
New York	Jacob Walton	1768-77	
New York	Jacobus Kipp	1716-26	
New York	James Alexander	1737-39	Also served as 4th New Jersey attorney general from 1723 to 1728. Father of William Alexander, Lord Stirling.
New York	James De Lancey	1768-77	Son of James De Lancey, governor of the Province of New York from 1753 to 1755.
New York	James Graham	1691–93, 1695-1701	
New York	James Jauncey	1768-77	
New York	Johannes Jansen	1709–11, 1716–26	Also served as 35th mayor of New York City from 1725 to 1726.
New York	Johannes Kipp	1691–93, 1698–99	
New York	John Cruger	1759-73	Also served as 41st mayor of New York City from 1757 to 1766. Son of 38th mayor of New York City John Cruger.
New York	Johannes de Peyster	1699-1702	Also served as 23rd mayor of New York City from 1698 to 1699.
New York	John Kerfbyl	1699	
New York	John Moore	1789-45	
New York	John Reade	1715-16	
New York	John Spratt	1693/4-95	Glasgow, Scotland born merchant who was the father of Mary Alexander and son-in-law of Johannes de Peyster Sr.
New York	John Van Home	1709-10	
New York	John Walter	1737-39	
New York	John Watts	1752-59	A Scottish immigrant. Father of U.S. Representative John Watts and son-in-law of Stephen Delancey.
New York	Lawrence Reade	1695–98, 1708–9, 1711–15	
New York	Leonard Lewis	1699-1701	
New York	Leonard Lispenard	1759-68	
New York	Oliver De Lancey	1756-61	Merchant and Loyalist.
New York	Paul Richards	1743-56	
New York	Peter De Lanoy	1693/4-95	Also served as 18th mayor of New York City from 1689 to 1691.
New York	Philip French	1698–99, 1702-8	Also served as the 27th mayor of New York City from 1702 to 1703.
New York	Philip Livingston	1759-69	
New York	Robert Blackwell	1693/4-95	
New York	Samuel Bayard	1713-16	Also served as a judge.
New York	Samuel Staats	1693/4-95	Son of Abraham Staats.
New York	Simon Johnson	1737-39	
New York	Stephen De Lanoy	1702–16, 1725–27	
New York	Thomas Coddrington	1702-9	
New York	Thomas Wenham	1698-99	
New York	Tunis De Key	1695-98	
New York	William Bayard	1761-68	Father of William Bayard Jr.
New York	William Merrett	1691-98	
New York	William Roome	1739-43	
Orange	Abraham Gouverneur	1699-1702	Speaker of the Assembly from 1699 to 1702.
Orange	Abraham Haring	1745-47	Father of lawyer and Continental Congressman John Haring.
Orange	Cornelius Cuyler	1716-26	
Orange	Cornelius Haring	1715–16, 1726–37	
Orange	Floris Crum	1702-8	
Orange	Gabriel Ludlow	1739-45	
Orange	Hendrick Ten Eyck	1710-15	One of the Great Nine Partners Patent.
Orange	Henry Wisner	1759-69	
Orange	John De Noyellis	1769-77	
Orange	Lancaster Symes	1726-37	
Orange	Michael Hawdin	1708-9	
Orange	Peter Haring	1701–2, 1709–10, 1716–26	
Orange	Samuel Gale	1750–59, 1769–77	
Orange	Selah Strong	1768-69	
Orange	Theodorus Snediker	1747/8-59	
Orange	Thomas Gale	1739-50	
Orange	Vincent Matthews	1787-89	
Orange	Cornelius Cuyper	1787-89	
Queens	Benjamin Hicks	1725-37	Relation of Federalist Assemblyman Benjamin Hicks.
Queens	Daniel Whitehead	1691–1701, 1702-4	
Queens	Daniel Кissam	1768?-77	
Queens	David Jones	1737-59	
Queens	David Thomas	1761	
Queens	Isaac Hicks	1716-39	
Queens	John Bound	1691	
Queens	John Jackson	1693–1701, 1702–16	
Queens	John Robinson	1691	
Queens	John Talman	1701, 1709–10	
Queens	John Townsend	1709-10	
Queens	John Treadwell	1691	
Queens	Jonathan Smith Sr.	1701-2	
Queens	Jonathan Whitehead	1704-9	
Queens	Nathaniel Pearsall	1691	
Queens	Thomas Cornell	1739-59	
Queens	Thomas Hicks	1701-2	
Queens	Thomas Hicks	1759-61	
Queens	Thomas Willet	1701, 1710–25	
Queens	Zebulon Seaman	1759–61, 1763–77	
Rensselaer Manor	Abraham Ten Broeck	1761-77	
Rensselaer Manor	Andries Coejemans	1791	
Rensselaer Manor	Andries Coejemans	1715-26	
Rensselaer Manor	Andries Douw	1708-5	Douw lived in Rensselaerswyck, where his family held extensive lands.
Rensselaer Manor	Hendrick van Rensselaer	1705-15	
Rensselaer Manor	Jeremias van Rensselaer	1726-43	
Rensselaer Manor	J.B. Van Rensselaer	1743-61	
Rensselaer Manor	Kiliaen van Rensselaer	1691–1701, 1702-3	
Richmond	Abraham Lakerman	1702-16	
Richmond	Adam Mott	1737-39	
Richmond	Benjamin Seaman	1759-77	
Richmond	Christopher Billop	1769-77	Later a United Empire Loyalist who served in the 1st New Brunswick Legislative Assembly.
Richmond	Elias Duksberry	1691, 1695–98	
Richmond	Garret Veghte	1699-1702	
Richmond	Henry Holland	1761-69	
Richmond	John Dally	1691	
Richmond	John La Count	1726-59	
Richmond	John Shadwell	1691-3/4	
Richmond	John Stillwell	1702-16	
Richmond	John Tennisen	1698	
Richmond	John Tennisen	1763/4-95	
Richmond	John Woglem	1698-99	
Richmond	Lambert Dorland	1691	
Richmond	Paul Micheaux	1750-52	
Richmond	Richard Merril	1725-37	
Richmond	Richard Stillwell	1739-50	
Richmond	Thomas Morgan	1698-1702	
Richmond	Thomas Stillwell	1691-98	
Richmond	William Walton	1752-61	A merchant who was one of the founders of the New York Society Library.
Suffolk	David Pierson	1737-45	
Suffolk	Eleazer Miller	1750-69	
Suffolk	Epenetus Platt	1723-37	
Suffolk	Henry Pierson	1691-95	Speaker of the Assembly from 1694 to 1695.
Suffolk	John Tuthill	1693-3/4, 1695–98	
Suffolk	Matthew Howell	1691-1705	
Suffolk	Nathaniel Woodhull	1769-77	Also a brigadier general of the New York Militia during the American Revolution.
Suffolk	Samuel Hutchinson	1721-23	
Suffolk	Samuel Mulford	1705-20	
Suffolk	William Nicoll	1701-23	A son of 6th New York City mayor Matthias Nicoll.
Suffolk	William Nicoll	1739-77	
Schenectady	Abraham Glen	1743	
Schenectady	Arent Bradt	1737–48, 1745–47	
Schenectady	Isaac Vrooman	1759-61	
Schenectady	Jacob Glen	1726–37, 1747/8-50	Namesake of Glen, New York.
Schenectady	Jacob Van Slyck	1750-52	
Schenectady	Jacobus Mynderse	1752–59, 1768–79	
Schenectady	Nicholas Groot	1761	
Schenectady	Nicholas Schuyler	1727-28	
Schenectady	Ryer Schermerhorn	1761	Grandson and principal heir of Ryer Jacobse Schermerhorn.
Ulster	Abraham G. Chambers	1716-39	
Ulster	Abraham Hasbrouck	1698-1701	One of twelve patent holders to the 40,000 acre New Paltz Patent.
Ulster	Abraham Hasbrouck	1739–45, 1747/8-50, 1759–68	Son of Abraham Hasbrouck.
Ulster	Adrien Garretson	1701-2	
Ulster	Albert Pawlding	1726–37, 1745	
Ulster	Charles DeWitt	1668-77	Also served as a delegate to the New York Provincial and Continental Congresses.
Ulster	Gaasbeck Chambers	1745-48	
Ulster	George Clinton	1768-77	He later served as the 1st governor of the State of New York and the 4th vice president of the United States.
Ulster	Hendrick Beekman	1691–93, 1695–98, 1702–16	Represented Westchester and Dutchess from 1691 to 1693. A son of acting New York City mayor Wilhelmus Beekman.
Ulster	Jacob Rutsen	1693/4-95, 1699–1702, 1713–26	Represented Ulster and Dutchess from 1693/4-95.
Ulster	Jacobus Bruyn	1759-68	Father of New York Assemblymen Jacobus S. Bruyn, Severyn Tenhout Bruyn, Johannes Bruyn, and Cornelius Bruyn.
Ulster	Johannes Hardenbergh	1737-43	Owner of the Hardenbergh patent of land in the Catskill Mountains.
Ulster	Johannes Jansen	1747/8-59	
Ulster	Moses De Pue Jr.	1752-59	
Ulster	Thomas Garton	1691, 1693/4-95, 1698–99, 1702-18	Represented Westchester and Dutchess in 1691 and 1693/4-95.
William Demire	1691–93, 1695–98		
Westchester	Adolph Philipse	1722-26	The second son of Frederick Philipse, the 1st Lord of the Philipsburg Manor, uncle to Frederick Philipse II.
Westchester	Caleb Heathcote	1701-2	Also served as 31st mayor of New York City from 1711 to 1713.
Westchester	Daniel Purdy	1739-43	
Westchester	Edmund Ward	1710-12	
Westchester	Frederick Philipse II	1726-50	The 2nd Lord of Philipsburg Manor, part of the Philipse Patent (today's Putnam County).
Westchester	Frederick Philipse III	1751-77	The 3rd (and last) Lord of Philipsburg Manor.
Westchester	Gilbert Willet	1728-32	
Westchester	Henry Fowler	1701	
Westchester	Humphrey Underhill	1693/4-97	
Westchester	John De Lancey	1764?-77	
Westchester	John Drake	1698–1701, 1709–10, 1713–15	
Westchester	John Haite	1712-13	
Westchester	John Hunt	1699-1701	
Westchester	John Pell	1691-95	The 2nd Lord of Pelham Manor.
Westchester	John Thomas	1743-77	
Westchester	Jonathan Odall	1715-16	
Westchester	Joseph Budd	1716-22	
Westchester	Joseph Purdy	1695–99, 1701–2, 1709–10	
Westchester	Joseph Theall	1691–95, 1697	
Westchester	Josiah Hunt	1702–10, 1715–16	
Westchester	Lewis Morris	1710-28	Uncle to Lewis Morris.
Westchester	Lewis Morris	1733-38	Governor of New Jersey
Westchester	Lewis Morris Jr.	1732-50	Also served as speaker of the Assembly
Westchester	Lewis Morris	1769	Also served as a delegate to the New York Provincial and Continental Congresses.
Westchester	Peter De Lancey	1750-68	Son of Stephen Delancey.
Westchester	William Willet	1701, 1702–9, 1710–15, 1716-33	
