= Abraham Hasbrouck =

Abraham Hasbrouck may refer to:

- Abraham Bruyn Hasbrouck (1791–1879), US Representative from New York
- Abraham E. Hasbrouck, New York assemblyman 1869 and 1870; see 93rd New York State Legislature
- Abraham J. Hasbrouck (1773–1845), US Representative from New York
