= Stephen Leonard =

Stephen Leonard may refer to:

- Stephen B. Leonard (1793–1876), U.S. Representative from New York
- Steve Leonard (born 1972), British veterinarian and television personality

== See also ==
- Sir Stephen Lennard, 2nd Baronet (1637–1709), English politician
- Leonard (surname)
