= Samuel Partridge =

American politician

- Born: November 29, 1790; Norwich, Vermont
- Died: March 30, 1883 (aged 92); Elmira, New York
- Resting place: Second Street Cemetery
- Office: Member of the U.S. House of Representatives
- Predecessor: Stephen B. Leonard
- Successor: Meade Purdy
- Political party: Democratic

Samuel Partridge (November 29, 1790 – March 30, 1883) was an American politician who served one term as a U.S. representative from New York from 1841 to 1843.

== Biography ==
Born in Norwich, Vermont, Partridge received a limited schooling.

=== War of 1812 ===
During the War of 1812 enlisted as a private in the Vermont Militia. Later appointed a captain of

=== Early career ===
Engineers in the Regular Army. He served two terms as high sheriff of Windsor County. He moved to New York and engaged in mercantile pursuits at Cold Spring in 1820. He moved to Chemung County, New York, in 1830 and to Elmira in 1837 and again engaged in mercantile pursuits.

=== Congress ===
Partridge was elected as a Democrat to the Twenty-seventh Congress, serving one term from March 4, 1841 to March 3, 1843.

=== Later career and death ===
He engaged in agricultural pursuits and the real estate business. He died in Elmira, New York, March 30, 1883. He was interred in Second Street Cemetery.

== Sources ==
- United States Congress. "Samuel Partridge (id: P000093)". Biographical Directory of the United States Congress.

U.S. House of Representatives
Preceded by Stephen B. Leonard	Member of the U.S. House of Representatives from New York's 22nd congressional district 1841–1843	Succeeded by Meade Purdy
