= Johannes Bruyn =

American politician

Member of the New York State Senate for the Middle District
- In office July 1, 1809 – June 30, 1813
- Preceded by: James G. Graham
- Succeeded by: Lucas Elmendorf

Member of the New York State Assembly for Ulster County
- In office July 1, 1799 – June 30, 1800
- Preceded by: Jacobus S. Bruyn
- In office July 1, 1796 – June 30, 1797
- Succeeded by: Jacobus S. Bruyn
- In office July 1, 1781 – June 30, 1783
- Succeeded by: John Cantine

Personal details
- Born: February 21, 1750 Shawangunk, New York
- Died: February 10, 1814 (aged 63) Shawangunk, New York
- Party: Democratic-Republican
- Spouse: Margaret DeWitt (m. 1783–1814)
- Relations: Severyn Tenhout Bruyn (brother); Jacobus S. Bruyn (brother); Cornelius Bruyn (brother); Andrew DeWitt Bruyn (nephew)
- Children: Charles DeWitt Bruyn
- Parent(s): Jacobus Bruyn; Jane Graham Pruyn

Johannes Bruyn (February 21, 1750 – February 10, 1814) was an American politician from Ulster County, New York.

== Early life ==
Bruyn was born on February 21, 1750, in Shawangunk, New York. He was a son of Jacobus Bruyn and Jane (née Graham) Pruyn (d. 1764). Among his siblings was elder sister Gertruyd Bruyn (the wife of Cornelius DuBois), twin brothers Severyn Tenhout Bruyn (also a New York Assemblymen) and Jacobus S. Bruyn (also a New York Assemblymen and member of New York State Senate; married Margaret DeWitt, a daughter of Andries J. DeWitt and Blandina Elmendorf Ten Eyck; father of Andrew DeWitt Bruyn), sister Mary Bruyn (wife of Nicholas Hardenberg), and brother Cornelius Bruyn (also a New York Assemblymen).

== Career ==
For a long time he was a judge of Ulster County and "enjoyed the esteem and confidence of the community; was a man of sound judgment, sterling integrity, and unwavering in his principles."

In April 1781, Bruyn was elected as a New York Assemblymen representing from Ulster County in the 5th and 6th New York State Legislatures and serving from July 1, 1781, until June 30, 1783. After two years, he was succeeded by John Cantine. He was a presidential elector for New York in 1792. In April 1796, he was again elected to the Assembly, this time as a Democratic-Republican, and served in the 20th New York State Legislature from July 1, 1796, to June 30, 1797, when he was replaced by his brother Jacobus. Two years later, Johannes replaced Jacobus in the Assembly. Johannes served in the 23rd New York State Legislature from July 1, 1799, to June 30, 1800.

In April 1809, he was elected as a Democratic-Republican to a four-year term in the New York State Senate for the 33rd New York State Legislature, and by virtue of that office a member of the Court of Errors. His seat was one of the 7 representing the Middle District which then consisted of Dutchess, Orange, Ulster, Columbia, Delaware, Rockland, Greene and Sullivan counties. Bruyn served in the 34th, 35th, 36th New York State Legislatures until June 30, 1813. In 1812, he was chosen as a member of the Council of Appointment.

== Personal life ==
On April 10, 1783, Bruyn was married to Margaret DeWitt (1758–1827), a daughter of Blandina (née DuBois) DeWitt and Col. Charles DeWitt, who served as a delegate to the Continental Congress. Margaret's brother Gerrit was the father of Charles G. DeWitt, a U.S. Representative who was appointed the U.S. Chargé d'Affaires to Guatemala by Andrew Jackson. Her sister Maria "Polly" DeWitt, was the wife of Jacobus "James" Hasbrouck, a prominent Kingston merchant. In addition, Margaret was a niece of Andries DeWitt and a first cousin of Jenneke DeWitt (the wife of Johannes' brother Jacobus). Together, they were the parents of:

- Charles DeWitt Bruyn (1784–1849), a New York Assemblyman who married his cousin, Maria Hasbrouck (1793–1851), a daughter of James Hasbrouck and Polly (née DeWitt) Hasbrouck.
- Cornelius Bruyn (1789–1873), the president of the Ulster County Bank who married Sarah Amelia Bevier, one of seven daughters of Capt. Philip DuBois Bevier and Ann (née DeWitt) Bevier. After her death in 1861 from stomach cancer, he married Catherine Van Vleck, a daughter of James Van Vleck of Shawangunk.

Bruyn died in Shawangunk, New York, on February 10, 1814.

Political offices
Preceded by James G. Graham	Member of the New York State Senate for the Middle District; 1809–1813	Succeeded by Lucas Elmendorf
