= Justice Jenkins =

Justice Jenkins may refer to:

- Charles J. Jenkins (1805–1883), associate justice of the Supreme Court of Georgia
- David Jenkins, Baron Jenkins (1899–1969), British Lord Justice of Appeal
- William Franklin Jenkins (1876–1961), associate justice of the Supreme Court of Georgia

== See also ==
- Judge Jenkins (disambiguation)
