= Cyrus Beers =

American politician

Member of the U.S. House of Representatives from New York's 22nd district
- In office December 3, 1838 – March 3, 1839
- Preceded by: Andrew DeWitt Bruyn
- Succeeded by: Stephen B. Leonard

Personal details
- Born: June 21, 1786 Newtown, Connecticut, US
- Died: June 5, 1850 (aged 63) Ithaca, New York, US
- Party: Democratic Party
- Spouse: Phebe Gregory Beers
- Children: 2
- Profession: merchant; politician

Cyrus Beers (June 21, 1786 – June 5, 1850) was an American businessman and politician who served briefly as a U.S. representative from New York from December 1838 to March 1839.

== Biography ==
Born in Newtown, Connecticut, Beers moved with his parents to New York City. He obtained a limited education in the public schools. He married Phebe Gregory, and they had two sons.

== Career ==
Beers engaged in mercantile pursuits and the lumber business. He moved to Ithaca, New York, in 1821 and engaged in the mercantile business. As well as his business pursuits, he served as delegate to the Democratic State convention at Herkimer in 1830. He was appointed commissioner of deeds at Ithaca in 1837.

=== Tenure in Congress ===
Elected as a Democrat to the Twenty-fifth Congress to fill the vacancy caused by the death of Andrew DeWitt Bruyn Beers was U. S. Representative for the twenty-second district of New York and served from December 3, 1838, to March 3, 1839. He was not a candidate for renomination in 1838 but served as delegate to the New York and Erie Railroad Convention at Ithaca in 1839. He resumed his former business pursuits in Ithaca, New York.

== Death ==
Beers died in Ithaca, Tompkins County, New York, on June 5, 1850 (age 63 years, 349 days). He is interred at City Cemetery, Ithaca, New York.

U.S. House of Representatives
Preceded by Andrew DeWitt Bruyn	Representative of the 22nd Congressional District of New York; December 3, 1838 – March 3, 1839	Succeeded by Stephen B. Leonard
