= Meade Purdy =

American politician

Smith Meade Purdy

Member of the U.S. House of Representatives from 's 22nd district
- In office March 4, 1843 – March 3, 1845
- Preceded by: Samuel Partridge
- Succeeded by: Stephen Strong

Personal details
- Born: July 31, 1796 North Norwich, New York, U.S
- Died: March 30, 1870 (aged 73) Norwich, New York, U.S.

Smith Meade Purdy (July 31, 1796 – March 30, 1870) was an American lawyer and politician who served one term as a U.S. representative from New York from 1843 to 1845.

== Biography ==
Born in North Norwich, New York, Purdy attended the common schools. He studied law. He was admitted to the bar and commenced practice at Sherburne, New York, in 1819. He moved to Norwich, New York, in 1827 and continued the practice of law. He was appointed judge of the court of common pleas and surrogate of Chenango County in 1833 and served until his resignation in 1837.

=== Congress ===
Purdy was elected as a Democrat to the Twenty-eighth Congress (March 4, 1843 – March 3, 1845). He was not a candidate for renomination in 1844.

=== Later career and death ===
He resumed the practice of law.

Purdy was elected judge and surrogate of Chenango County in 1847 and served until 1851. He declined a renomination owing to poor health and retired from active pursuits.

He died in Norwich, New York, March 30, 1870. He was interred in Mount Hope Cemetery.

== Sources ==
- United States Congress. "Meade Purdy (id: P000571)". Biographical Directory of the United States Congress.

U.S. House of Representatives
Preceded by Samuel Partridge	Member of the U.S. House of Representatives from New York's 22nd congressional district 1843–1845	Succeeded by Stephen Strong
