= Cynthia Morgan St. John =

American book collector, author (1852–1919)

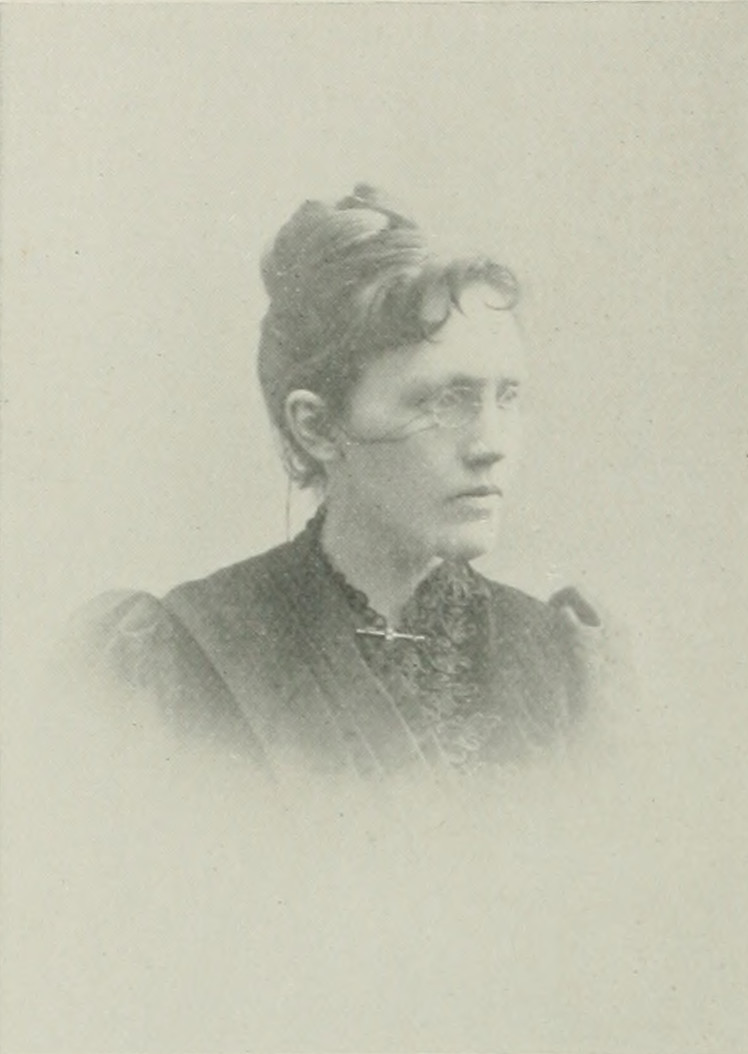
- Photo in A Woman of the Century
- Born: Cynthia Morgan; October 11, 1852; Ithaca, New York, U.S.
- Died: August 10, 1919 (aged 66); Clifton Springs, New York, U.S.
- Occupations: Wordsworthian; book collector; author
- Spouse: Henry Ancel St. John (m. 1883)
- Children: 2
- Relatives: Andrew DeWitt Bruyn (grandfather)
- Writing career
- Notable work: Wordsworth for the Young

Cynthia Morgan St. John (née, Morgan; October 11, 1852 – August 10, 1919) was an American Wordsworthian, book collector, and author. In her day, she owned the largest and most valuable Wordsworth library in the U.S. She was engaged in collecting books for 40 years.

== Early life and education ==
Cynthia Morgan was born in Ithaca, New York, October 11, 1852. She was the only daughter of Dr. Edward J. Morgan, a successful homeopathic physician, and Anne Bruyn Morgan, Her maternal grandfather was Judge Andrew DeWitt Bruyn. From early girlhood, St. John showed a passionate love of nature and a devotion for the poetry of Wordsworth. She also possessed the inclination of composition and wrote for children's papers before the age of fourteen.

She was educated in a small private school, with private teachers, and lectures in Cornell University.

== Career ==
She was president of a Working Girls' Union and gave her sympathies, her time and her writing to forward that cause. She frequently contributed articles upon religious, benevolent or educational subjects to the religious press, in particular to the Sunday-School Times, and wrote two or three short stories.

Her one preeminent interest in a literary way was Wordsworthian. She was a member of the English Wordsworth Society and was a contributor to its meetings. In that way, she formed friendships with prominent Wordsworthians, among whom was Prof. William Angus Knight, of University of St Andrews , secretary and founder of the Wordsworth Society. In 1896, she prepared the "American Bibliography of Wordsworth" for Knight's final edition of The Complete Works of Wordsworth.

St. John collected the largest Wordsworth library in the U.S., and probably the largest in the world in its day. The library contained all the regular editions, the complete U.S. editions of the poetry, autograph letters, prints, portraits, sketches and relics associated with the poet. In 1883, St John, with her husband, visited the England's Lake District and saw every place associated with Wordsworth from his birth to his death, and alluded to in his poems. One result of that visit was a "Wordsworth Floral Album", the flowers, ferns and grasses in which were gathered by her own hand. The chief publication of her lifelong study of the poet was her Wordsworth for the Young (1891), with an introduction for parents and teachers. The object of the book was to bring the child to nature through Wordsworth.

== Personal life ==
On June 25, 1883, she married Henry Ancel St. John. in his early career, he was a civil engineer, the designer and builder of the Third Avenue Elevated Railway in New York City, and upon his return to Ithaca, he engaged in the manufacturing business, served as mayor of the city, and established the park, creek, and drainage system. They were residents of Ithaca, and had two children, Edward Morgan (b. 1886), Sheila Annesly (b. 1891).

She was interested in Biblical study, missionary work (home and foreign), and work among the poor. She was against woman suffrage. In religion, she was a Congregationalist. In politics, she was a Republican. St. John was a member of the Bibliophile Society of Boston and the Country Club of Ithaca, New York.

== Death and legacy ==
Cynthia Morgan St. John died at Clifton Springs, New York, August 10, 1919, from pneumonia.

In 1924, Cornell University Library received an aggregation of Ithaca imprints and books about Ithaca, together with several written by Ithaca authors, a gift of St. John.

== Selected works ==
Wordsworth for the Young (1891)

- Wordsworth for the Young, with an introduction for parents and teachers (1891)
- American Bibliography of Wordsworth (1896)
- Memorial Lines in the Death of Charles Lamb (1904)
