= Ausburn Birdsall =

American politician

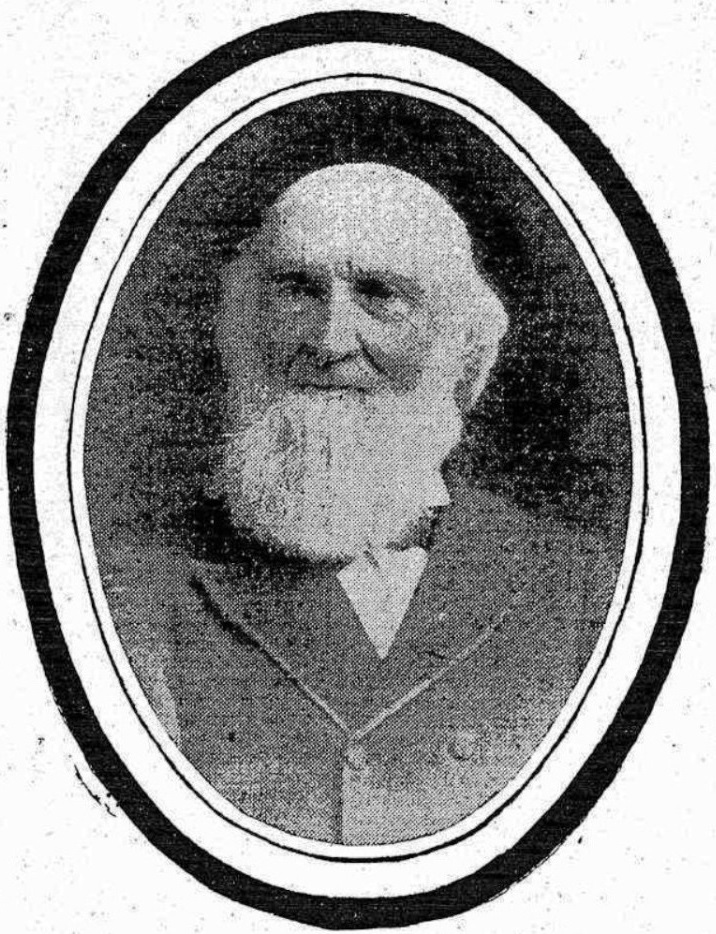

Member of the U.S. House of Representatives from New York's 22nd district
- In office March 4, 1847 – March 3, 1849
- Preceded by: Stephen Strong
- Succeeded by: Henry Bennett

Personal details
- Born: November 13, 1814 Otego, New York, U.S.
- Died: July 10, 1903 (aged 88) New York City, New York, U.S.
- Resting place: Woodlawn Cemetery; Bronx, New York, U.S.
- Party: Democratic Party
- Spouses: Louisa Birdsall; Eliza Reynolds Montgomery Birdsall
- Children: Ausburn Birdsall; Grace Birdsall
- Profession: lawyer; politician

Ausburn Birdsall (November 13, 1814 – July 10, 1903) was an American lawyer and politician who served one term as a U.S. representative from New York from 1847 to 1849.

== Biography ==
Born in Otego, New York, Birdsall was the son of Michael and Wealthy Webster Birdsall. He married Louisa and they had a son, Ausburn. His second wife was Eliza Reynolds Montgomery and they had a daughter, Grace.

== Career ==
Birdsall was a lawyer in private practice. He served as district attorney of Broome County, New York.

=== Congress ===
Birdsall was elected as a Democrat to the Thirtieth Congress as United States Representative for the twenty-second district of New York from March 4, 1847, to March 3, 1849.

He later served as supply supervisor of the United States Navy.

== Death and burial ==
Birdsall died in Manhattan, New York County, New York, on July 10, 1903 (age 88 years, 239 days). His original interment was at Spring Forest Cemetery, Binghamton, New York, and his reinterment in 1910 was at Woodlawn Cemetery, Bronx, New York.

U.S. House of Representatives
Preceded by Stephen Strong	Member of the U.S. House of Representatives from New York's 22nd congressional district March 4, 1847 – March 3, 1849	Succeeded by Henry Bennett
