= Ryer Jacobse Schermerhorn =

American merchant, politician and judge

Ryer Schermerhorn

Member of the New York General Assembly
- In office 1683–1702
- Preceded by: Inaugural holder

Personal details
- Born: June 23, 1652 Beverwyck, New Netherland
- Died: February 19, 1719 (aged 66) Beverwyck, Province of New York
- Spouse: Ariantje Bradt Otten (m. 1676; died 1717)
- Parent(s): Jacob Janse Schermerhorn; Jannetje Segers Schermerhorn

Ryer Jacobse Schermerhorn (June 23, 1652 – February 19, 1719) was a merchant, politician and judge in provincial New York. He was the progenitor of the Schenectady branch of the Schermerhorn family.

== Early life ==
Schermerhorn was born on June 23, 1652, and grew up in a Beverwyck home and then in Schenectady where his father also owned property. He was the eldest son of New Netherland pioneers Jannetje "Johanna" (née Segers) Schermerhorn and Jacob Janse Schermerhorn, who settled in New York from the Netherlands in 1636.

In 1648, his father, a prominent Beverwyck trader, was arrested at Fort Orange by Peter Stuyvesant for selling firearms and ammunition to the Indians. Schermerhorn's books and papers were seized, his property was ordered to be confiscated, and he was sentenced for five years imprisonment at Fort Amsterdam. Several leading citizens interfered and had his imprisonment struck, but his property was totally lost. He went back into trade, served as commissary at Fort Orange, one of the most important offices in the Colony, and was constable of Albany in 1676.

== Career ==
In 1664, the English seized the New Netherland colony from the Dutch and renamed it New York. They confirmed the monopoly on the fur trade by Albany, and issued orders to prohibit Schenectady from the trade through 1670 and later. Settlers purchased additional land from the Mohawk in 1670 and 1672. Schermerhorn built a fortune in trade, primarily from shipping timber for use in shipbuilding and, throughout his lifetime, he grew the substantial landholdings he obtained through his marriage and from his father.

During the 1680s, he led a group that vied for power with the original fifteen Schenectady patentees seeking acceptance at the provincial level. In 1684, Governor Thomas Dongan granted letters patent for Schenectady, encompassing about 80,000 acres, to five new trustees: Schermerhorn, William Teller, Sweer Teunessen Van Velsen, Jan Van Eps and Myndert Wemp. After Van Velsen, Van Eps and Wemp were killed in the Schenectady massacre of 1689 and Teller (an old man who moved to New YOrk in 1692 where he died in 1700), Schermerhorn became the sole trustee of the Schenectady Patent.

After his father's death in 1688, he took the place as head of the family.

=== Public career ===
Upon the establishment of the first New York General Assembly by Governor Dongan in 1683, Schermerhorn was appointed to the Assembly for Albany. He was elected to the provincial Assembly in 1683, 1694, 1698, 1699 and 1701. While in office, he sided with the government proposed by the insurgent Jacob Leisler. He was appointed a justice of the peace in 1689, and on May 1, 1700, he was appointed assistant Judge of the Common Pleas at Albany.

== Personal life ==
Coat of Arms of Ryer Jacobse Schermerhorn

In July 1676, Schermerhorn married Ariantje Arentse "Harriet" (née Bradt)) Otten (c. 1651–1719), the widow of Helmer Otten and daughter of fellow pioneers Arent Andriesse Bradt and Cathalina (née De Vos) Bradt (and step-daughter of Claes J. Van Bockhoven, who married her mother after her father's death in c. 1663). Together, they were the parents of at least seven children, including:

- Cornelis Schermerhorn (1678–1678), who died young.
- Jannetje Schermerhorn (1679–1750), who married Volkert Symonse Veeder (1678–1733), son of Symon Volkers Veeder, in 1698.
- Catalynje Reyerse Schermerhorn (1681–1708), who married Johannes Myndertse Wemple, son of Myndert Janse Wemple, in 1701.
- Johannes "Jan" Reyerse Schermerhorn (1685–1752), who married Engletie Janse Vrooman (1695–1754), a daughter of Johannes Hendrickse Vrooman, in 1711.
- Segar Schermerhorn (b. 1686), who died young.
- Jacob Ryers Schermerhorn (1692–1753), who married Margarita Teller, a daughter of Johannes Teller.
- Arent Schermerhorn (1693–1757), who married Annetje "Anna" Jansen Fonda, a daughter of Douwe Jellis Fonda.

His wife died on April 7, 1717. Schermerhorn died on February 19, 1719, and the principal heir of his estate was his grandson, Ryer Schermerhorn, who also served in the General Assembly.
