= Hasbrook =

Hasbrook is a surname, an Americanized form of French Hasbrouck, a toponymic surname referring to someone from Hazebrouck, France, meaning "hare fen". Notable people with the surname include:

- Annette Hasbrook (born 1964), American NASA flight director
- Ziggy Hasbrook (1893–1976), American baseball player

== See also ==
- Hasbrouck (disambiguation)
