= Rapalje (disambiguation) =

Rapalje is a Dutch Celtic-folk band.

Rapalje may also refer to:

- George Rapalje (d. c. 1816), traded with the Choctaw in colonial Mississippi
- John Rapalje (1728–1802), Loyalist landowner in New York

== See also ==
- Rapelje (disambiguation)
