= Jacobus S. Bruyn =

American politician

Member of the New York State Senate for the Middle District
- In office July 1, 1800 – June 30, 1805
- Preceded by: John Addison
- Succeeded by: James G. Graham

Member of the New York State Assembly for Ulster County
- In office July 1, 1797 – June 30, 1799
- Preceded by: Johannes Bruyn
- Succeeded by: Johannes Bruyn

Personal details
- Born: April 7, 1749 Shawangunk, New York
- Died: May 25, 1823 (aged 74) Wawarsing, New York
- Party: Democratic-Republican
- Spouse: Jenneke DeWitt (before 1823)
- Relations: Severyn Tenhout Bruyn (brother); Johannes Bruyn (brother); Cornelius Bruyn (brother); Charles DeWitt Bruyn (nephew)
- Children: Andrew DeWitt Bruyn
- Parent(s): Jacobus Bruyn; Jane Graham Pruyn

Jacobus Severyn Bruyn (April 7, 1749 – May 25, 1823) was an American politician from Ulster County, New York.

== Early life ==
Bruyn was born on April 7, 1749, in Shawangunk, New York. He was a son of Jacobus Bruyn and Jane (née Graham) Pruyn (d. 1764). Among his siblings was elder sister Gertruyd Bruyn (the wife of Cornelius DuBois), twin brother Severyn Tenhout Bruyn (also a New York Assemblymen), brother Johannes Bruyn (also a New York Assemblymen and member of New York State Senate; married Margaret DeWitt, a daughter of Col. Charles DeWitt and Blandina DuBois; father of Charles DeWitt Bruyn), sister Mary Bruyn (wife of Nicholas Hardenberg), and brother Cornelius Bruyn (also a New York Assemblymen).

== Career ==
In April 1797, Bruyn was elected to succeed his brother Johannes as a Democratic-Republican New York Assemblymen from Ulster County in the 21st and 22nd New York State Legislatures from July 1, 1797, until June 30, 1799. After two years, he was succeeded by the same brother he had replaced. In 1800, he was elected to a one-year term in the New York State Senate to fill the vacancy left by John Addison for the 24th New York State Legislature. His seat was one of the 12 representing the Middle District which then consisted of Dutchess, Orange, Ulster, Columbia, Delaware, Rockland and Greene counties. In April 1801, Bruyn was reelected to a four-year term, serving in the 25th, 26th, 27th and 28th New York State Legislatures until June 30, 1805.

== Personal life ==
Bruyn was married to Jenneke DeWitt (1755–1823), a daughter of Andries J. DeWitt and Blandina Elmendorf (née Ten Eyck) DeWitt. Jenneke was a niece of Col. Charles DeWitt and a first cousin of Margaret DeWitt (the wife of Jacobus' brother Johannes). Together, they were the parents of:

- Blandina Bruyn (1776–1841), who married John I. Hardenburg, a son of Johannes Gerardus Hardenburg, of the Hardenbergh patent.
- Jane Bruyn (1778–1818), who died unmarried.
- Jacobus Bruyn (b. 1780)
- Mary Bruyn (b. 1783)
- Ann Bruyn (b. 1785)
- Maria Bruyn (b. 1788)
- Andris "Andrew" DeWitt Bruyn (1790–1838), a New York Assemblymen in 1818; president of the Ithaca in 1822, and a U.S. Representative from New York for the 22nd District from 1837 to 1838.

Bruyn died in Wawarsing, New York, on May 25, 1823, and was buried at Wawarsing Cemetery in Wawarsing.

Political offices
| Preceded by John Addison | Member of the New York State Senate for the Middle District; 1800–1805 | Succeeded by James G. Graham |
| Preceded by Johannes Bruyn | Member of the New York State Assembly for Ulster County; 1797–1799 | Succeeded by Johannes Bruyn |
