= George O. Belden =

American politician (1797–1833)

George Ogilvie Belden

Member of the U.S. House of Representatives from New York's 7th district
- In office March 4, 1827 – March 3, 1829
- Preceded by: Abraham Bruyn Hasbrouck
- Succeeded by: Charles G. DeWitt

Personal details
- Born: March 28, 1797 Norwalk, Connecticut, US
- Died: October 9, 1833 (aged 36) Monticello, New York, US
- Party: Jacksonian
- Profession: Lawyer

Military service
- Branch/service: Infantry of the State of New York
- Years of service: 1831
- Rank: General
- Unit: Twenty-third Brigade

George Ogilvie Belden (March 28, 1797 – October 9, 1833) was an American lawyer and politician who served one term as and a U.S. Representative from New York from 1827 to 1829.

== Biography ==
Born in Norwalk, Connecticut, Belden attended the public schools. He was admitted to the bar and practiced in Monticello, New York.

=== Tenure in Congress ===
Belden was elected as a Jacksonian to the Twentieth Congress and served as U. S. Representative for the seventh district of New York from March 4, 1827, to March 3, 1829.

=== Later career ===
Afterward, Belden resumed the practice of law. He served as general of the Twenty-third Brigade of Infantry of the State of New York in 1831.

== Death ==
Belden died in Monticello, New York, on October 9, 1833.

U.S. House of Representatives
Preceded by Abraham Bruyn Hasbrouck	Member of the U.S. House of Representatives from New York's 7th congressional district March 4, 1827 – March 3, 1829	Succeeded by Charles G. DeWitt
