= Stephen Strong =

American politician

Member of the U.S. House of Representatives from New York's 22nd district
- In office March 4, 1845 – March 3, 1847
- Preceded by: Meade Purdy
- Succeeded by: Ausburn Birdsall

Personal details
- Born: October 11, 1791 Lebanon, Connecticut
- Died: April 15, 1866 (aged 74) Watertown, New York
- Party: Democratic Party
- Spouses: Abigail Whittlesey Camp (m. 1838; died 1858) Roxanna Bush (m. 1861)
- Parent(s): Adonijah Strong; Hepzibah Bliss Strong
- Education: Hamilton College
- Profession: Lawyer

Stephen Strong (October 11, 1791 – April 15, 1866) was an American lawyer and politician and one term as a U.S. Representative from New York from 1845 to 1847.

== Early life ==
Strong was born in Lebanon, Connecticut, and later moved to New York. He was the son of Adonijah Strong (1760–1815) and Hepzibah (née Bliss) Strong. Among his siblings was Bela William Strong (a lawyer who died in a duel in 1815), Lucy Strong, Abigail Strong (his twin who died in infancy), and Abigail Strong, who married Daniel C. Shearman. His father was a farmer who fought in the Revolutionary War and was at the Battle of Yorktown.

He attended Oneida Academy, today known as Hamilton College in Clinton, New York.

== Career ==
After studying the law, he was admitted to the bar in 1822 and began to practice.

"He was an eminent advocate, famous not for his technical legal knowledge, but for his great tact and ingenuity, and wonderful resources of his own in the management of cases, and for his inspiring and magnetic powers of eloquent speech which was always more powerful than polished."

From 1836 to 1838, and again from 1844 to 1847, he served as district attorney of Tioga County. In between his service as district attorney, he served as judge of Tioga County from 1838 to 1843.

=== Congress ===
Strong was elected as a Democrat to the Twenty-ninth Congress serving from March 4, 1845, to March 3, 1847. During his time in the House, he served as chairman of the Committee on Expenditures in the Department of State.

After Ausburn Birdsall succeeded him in the House, Strong resumed the practice of law in Owego, New York. He again served as judge of Tioga County from 1855 to 1859. In 1861, he moved to Watertown, New York, and practiced law there.

== Personal life ==
On July 10, 1838, Strong was married to Abigail (née Whittlesey) Camp (1777–1858), the widow of William Camp, Strong's law partner, and daughter of Capt. Asaph Whittlesey, who was killed in the Battle of Wyoming and was a descendant of Gov. Thomas Dudley.

After her death in 1858, he remarried to Roxanna Bush (1789–1883), the widow of Norris M. Woodruff, a hardware merchant, and the eldest child of Eli Bush and Roxanna (née Terry) Bush, on June 19, 1861. He did not have any children of his own, but was revered by the children of both of his wives.

=== Death ===
He died in Watertown, New York, on April 15, 1866, and was buried at Brookside Cemetery in Watertown.

U.S. House of Representatives
| Preceded by Meade Purdy | Member of the U.S. House of Representatives from New York's 22nd congressional district 1845–1847 | Succeeded by Ausburn Birdsall |
