= Lemuel Jenkins =

American politician (1789–1862)

Member of the U.S. House of Representatives from New York's 7th district
- In office March 4, 1823 – March 3, 1825
- Preceded by: Charles H. Ruggles
- Succeeded by: Abraham Bruyn Hasbrouck

Personal details
- Born: October 20, 1789 Bloomingburg, New York, U.S.
- Died: August 18, 1862 (aged 72) Albany, New York, U.S.
- Resting place: Albany Rural Cemetery, Menands, New York, U.S.
- Party: Democratic-Republican
- Spouse(s): Gertrude Pearson Huyck (m. 1819) Elizabeth Tracy Kidd (m. 1832)
- Children: 3, including Charles
- Parent(s): Lemuel Jenkins; Mary Dunham
- Profession: Politician, lawyer

Lemuel Jenkins (October 20, 1789 – August 18, 1862) was an American lawyer and politician from New York.

== Life ==
Jenkins was born in Bloomingburgh, then Ulster County, now Sullivan County, New York, the posthumous son of Lemuel Jenkins (1740–1789), originally of Edgartown, Massachusetts, and his third wife Mary (Dunham) Jenkins (1759–1809). He was admitted to the bar in October 1815, and practiced in Bloomingburgh. He was District Attorney of Sullivan County from 1818 to 1819. On May 13, 1819, he married Gertrude Pearson Huyck, and their children were Leonine Jenkins (1820–1849), Mary Elizabeth (Jenkins) McGill (born 1821) and Charles Edward Jenkins (born 1822).

Jenkins was elected as a Crawford Democratic-Republican to the 18th United States Congress, holding office from March 4, 1823, to March 3, 1825. Afterwards he removed to Albany, and resumed the practice of law there. On September 17, 1832, he married his second wife Elizabeth Tracy Kidd.

He died in Albany, New York, and was buried at Albany Rural Cemetery in Menands, New York.

His son Charles E. Jenkins removed to Milwaukee in 1848, was a member of the Wisconsin State Assembly in 1850 and 1851, and Judge of the Milwaukee County Court from 1854 to 1856.

U.S. House of Representatives
Preceded by Charles H. Ruggles	Member of the U.S. House of Representatives from New York's 7th congressional district 1823–1825	Succeeded by Abraham Bruyn Hasbrouck
