= Henry Bennett (American politician) =

American politician

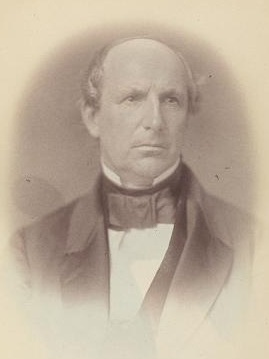

Member of the U.S. House of Representatives from New York
- In office March 4, 1849 – March 3, 1859
- Preceded by: Ausburn Birdsall
- Succeeded by: R. Holland Duell
- Constituency: 22nd district (1849–53); 21st district (1853–59)

Personal details
- Born: September 29, 1808 New Lisbon, New York, U.S.
- Died: May 10, 1868 (aged 59) New Berlin, New York, U.S.
- Resting place: St. Andrews' Cemetery, New Berlin, New York
- Party: Whig (1853–1857); Republican (1857–1868)
- Spouse: Polly Maria Gibson Bennett
- Profession: Attorney, Politician

Henry Bennett (September 29, 1808 – May 10, 1868) was an American lawyer and politician who served five terms as a United States representative from New York from 1849 to 1859.

== Biography ==
Bennett was born in New Lisbon, Otsego County, New York on September 29, 1808, where he attended public schools. He married Polly Maria Gibson.

== Career ==
Bennett studied law, was admitted to the bar in 1832 and practiced law in New Berlin, Chenango County, New York. He served as clerk of the town of New Berlin in 1846.

=== Congress ===
Elected as a Whig to the Thirty-first through the Thirty-fourth Congresses, Bennett was re-elected as a Republican to the Thirty-fifth Congress, thereby serving from March 4, 1849 until March 3, 1859. He was the chairman of the Committee on Public Lands in the Thirty-fourth Congress.

=== Later career ===
In 1858 Bennett unsuccessfully sought renomination to the Thirty-sixth Congress, and resumed the practice of law in New Berlin, until his death.

== Death ==
Bennett died in New Berlin, Chenango County, New York, on May 10, 1868 at the age of 59. He is interred at St. Andrews' Cemetery, New Berlin, New York.

U.S. House of Representatives
Preceded by Ausburn Birdsall	Member of the U.S. House of Representatives from New York's 22nd congressional district 1849–1853	Succeeded by Gerrit Smith
Preceded by William W. Snow	Member of the U.S. House of Representatives from New York's 21st congressional district 1853–1859	Succeeded by R. Holland Duell
