= Benjamin DuBois Stone House =

Historic house in New York, United States

- Benjamin DuBois Stone House--Captain Martin Stone House
- U.S. National Register of Historic Places
- Location within New York Location within the United States
- Location: Catskill, New York
- Coordinates: 42°13′14″N 73°52′12″W
- Built: 1740
- Architectural style: Colonial, Gothic Revival
- NRHP reference No.: 95001333
- Added to NRHP: November 22, 1995

The Benjamin DuBois Stone House, also known as the Captain Martin Stone House, is located at 347 West Main Street, Catskill, New York, on the west side of Catskill Creek. It is significant for its architecture and historically for its relation to the settlement of the area. The Dubois family were some of the original white settlers of the town. The house was built in the 1740s. After passing out of the DuBois family, it was owned by Captain Martin, who made extensive renovations to the house in the mid nineteenth century. It was added to the National Register of Historic Places in 1995. It differs from the DuBois Stone House, though they are both listed at the same address on their National Register of Historic Places nomination forms. The pictures attached to the two forms are of different structures.
