= Abraham Bruyn Hasbrouck =

American politician (1791–1879)

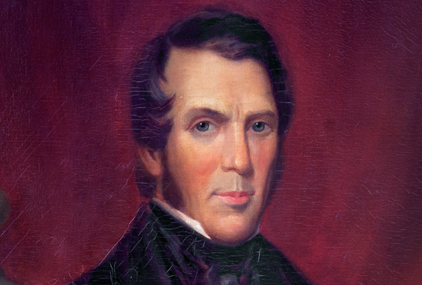

6th President of Rutgers University
- In office 1840–1840
- Preceded by: Philip Milledoler
- Succeeded by: Theodore Frelinghuysen

Member of the U.S. House of Representatives from New York's 7th district
- In office March 4, 1825 – March 3, 1827
- Preceded by: Lemuel Jenkins
- Succeeded by: George O. Belden

Personal details
- Born: November 29, 1791 Kingston, New York, U.S.
- Died: February 23, 1879 (aged 87) Kingston, New York, U.S.
- Spouse: Julia Frances Ludlum (m. 1819; died 1869)
- Children: 2

Abraham Bruyn Hasbrouck (November 29, 1791 – February 23, 1879) was a United States Congressman from New York and the sixth President of Rutgers College (now Rutgers University) serving from 1840 to 1850. He was a slaveholder.

== Biography ==
He was born in 1791 in Kingston, New York, to Jonathan Hasbrouck (1763–1846) and Catherine Wynkoop (1763–1846).

He studied at the Kingston Academy in Kingston, New York before entering Yale College where he graduated in 1810. Studying the law under Tapping Reeve, Elisha Williams, and James Gould, he returned to Kingston, New York, in 1814 to practice law. In 1817 he started a law practice with Charles H. Ruggles.

He married on September 12, 1819, to Julia Frances Ludlum (1795–1869), the sister of Judge Gabriel W. Ludlum. Together they had eight children, including a son: Jonathan Howard Bruyn Hasbrouck (1820–1899), and a daughter, Caroline Hone Hasbrouck (1830–1898), who married George H. Sharpe, also a Hasbrouck descendant.

Hasbrouck was elected to the 19th United States Congress, holding office from March 4, 1825, to March 3, 1827. In 1840, he was appointed as the sixth president of Rutgers College. He was the first layman to hold the office. During his tenure as president, he taught rhetoric, constitutional Law, and political economy.

He worked to gain more independence from the Dutch Reformed Church and added modern languages to the curriculum, and expanded scientific instruction to the curriculum. He resigned from the office in 1849. He remained in office until 1850 when Theodore Frelinghuysen was appointed as his successor.

Hasbrouck retired to Kingston, New York, where he died of pneumonia on February 23, 1879.

== Legacy ==
Abraham Bruyn Hasbrouck was a descendant of the Hasbroucks who founded New Paltz in 1678. The Hasbroucks were Huguenots, Protestant followers of John Calvin who fled what is today Northern France and South Belgium who fled persecution by the ruling Catholics. The original settlement of their ancestors survives today as Historic Huguenot Street, a National Historic Landmark District.

A street named after him in both Newburgh and Kingston, New York. The street in Kingston is named "Abruyn," because of the way he would sign his name, "A. Bruyn Hasbrouck," to differentiate himself from his first cousin, Abraham J. Hasbrouck.

U.S. House of Representatives
Preceded by Lemuel Jenkins	Member of the U.S. House of Representatives from New York's 7th congressional district 1825–1827	Succeeded by George O. Belden
Academic offices
Preceded by Philip Milledoler	President of Rutgers University; 1840–1850	Succeeded by Theodore Frelinghuysen
