= James Jauncey =

James Jauncey Jr. was a ship captain, merchant, and most notably a loyalist in the New York General Assembly.

== Early career ==
He originally started off his career as a merchant captain in Bermuda. He traded between the Caribbean and New York and eventually settled in New York in 1743 as a merchant/business man.

He kept his connections with many goods coming from the Caribbean and subsequently found himself funding many privateers, including owning his own privateer fleets. With his major successes as a merchant in New York, Jauncey became the Warden of the Port in 1758 (an office he held until 1774).

== Stamp Act ==
In 1765, after the passing of the Stamp Act 1765, Jauncey was one of the merchants who agreed not to import any British goods as long as the Stamp Act withstood. Subsequently, he also was one of the significant advocates that addressed this issue in the New York General Assembly. This issue of the Stamp Act would be one of the main reasons that Jauncey would be elected into the Assembly. John Morin Scott, the candidate facing Jauncey, was an adamant supporter of the Stamp Act.

== Election to New York General Assembly ==
On March 11, 1768, Jauncey (having nominated himself a month earlier) had been elected into the New York General Assembly. This was a controversial time for him because his honor was questioned by fellow candidate John Morin Scott. The matters were on delicate ones pertaining to honesty, corruption, and embezzlement. One such dispute was in a written document presented by Gezelena Rousby. The dispute here was about an "unjust" imprisonment of a man over a debt owed by a Henry Lane. According to Rousby, the estate was given to be taken care of by the Widow and her father William Rousby. There had existed a 155-pound debt for Henry Lane and instead of having Jauncey take the house as sufficient payment (which would have proven more than sufficiently capable), he wanted to have the Rousby's and Widow of Lane pay off the debt instead. Their refusal led to the imprisonment of William Rousby. At this time, James Duane (the future mayor of New York) used his influence to help defend Jauncey against the accusations. After long discussion amongst the General Assembly, on December 16, 1768, it was found that Jauncey was innocent and was worthy of his position in the Assembly. Subsequently, a newsletter was written thanking/acknowledging those who had supported and did not falter to the false slanders against James Jauncey.

The election of 1769 was another close call as Jauncey, along with Henry Cruger, Oliver De Lancey, and Walton scraped by with votes against their Church supported party. With their triumphs, each of the men donated 200 pounds to the poor, of which there was great public praise. In fact, this was so much the case that several verses of song praised these men in their generosities. Subsequently, there were public slanders against supposed political opponents who questioned the generosity of those individuals like Jauncey; however there were subsequent political campaign flyers/pamphlets that mentioned secret dealings of generosity of men like Jauncey. Jauncey's popular standing amongst the populace ensured his position to last until his dismissal in 1775.

== War of Independence ==
In 1775, the colony of New York was taking sides in the developing conflict. Jauncey found himself siding with the loyalist faction while a good majority of his supporters (members of his Presbyterian church) favoured independence. Jauncey's popular standing amongst the populace helped him keep his position until his dismissal in 1775.

On June 5, 1776, Jauncey was considered a suspected person and traitorous to the Patriot cause. In August 1776, Jauncey, as well as his father (James Jauncey) and brother William, were imprisoned in Middletown, Connecticut. Jauncey was arrested on matters of considering himself worthy of his granted title (Master of the Rolls) that had been set in place by the prior government (under British rule). It was considered traitorous to acknowledge the old form of government. In addition, due to a being connected by marriage to Sir Gilbert Elliot, a prominent figure in Parliament who advocated against American revolutionary efforts, the Jauncey family was labelled as a suspicious group undermining the colonial government authority. On December 20, 1776, the Jauncey family was given parole.

On October 22, 1779, Jauncey was banished from the new American States because of his fervent support of the British sovereign. In February 1784, he asked the New York Legislature to be sympathetic and drop their charges related to a bill of attainder; however they ignored his pleas.

Jauncey's living sons (William and John) wrote up a petition on January 22, 1790, to allow James Jauncey to return to New York. Jauncey died February 6, 1790, even though it would be passed a couple months later to allow Jauncey to return to New York.
