= DuBois Stone House =

Historic house in New York, United States

- U.S. National Register of Historic Places
- Location within New York Location within the United States
- Location: Catskill, New York
- Coordinates: 42°13′9″N 73°52′11″W
- Built: 1762
- Architect: Huybartus DuBois; Cornelius DuBois
- Architectural style: Colonial
- NRHP reference No.: 95001336
- Added to NRHP: November 22, 1995

The DuBois Stone House is located at 347 West Main Street, in Catskill, New York, on the west side of Catskill Creek. It was built in 1762 by Huybartus DuBois and Cornelius DuBois, sons of Benjamin DuBois, one of the original white settlers of the area. It is significant for its late 18th-century architecture and as the home of Huybartus DuBois and his family. After passing out of the DuBois family, the house was owned by the Washburn Brick Company, and the Union Free School District Number 1. In the 1940s it was used as a classroom for Home Economics. Later, it was used as administrative offices. The house was added to the National Register of Historic Places in 1995. In 2008, it is again a private residence.

This house differs from the Benjamin DuBois Stone House-Captain Martin Stone House, though the National Register of Historic Places nomination forms place them both at this address (likely due to the fact that both houses are currently situated on the grounds of the local high school). The pictures attached to the nominations are of different houses.

This house also differs from the 1762 stone house at 281 West Main Street which served as the home of Cornelius DuBois and was the site of a local celebration of the surrender of General Charles Cornwallis at Yorktown.
