= Abraham Hasbrouck House =

Coordinates: 41°45′09″N 74°05′18″W

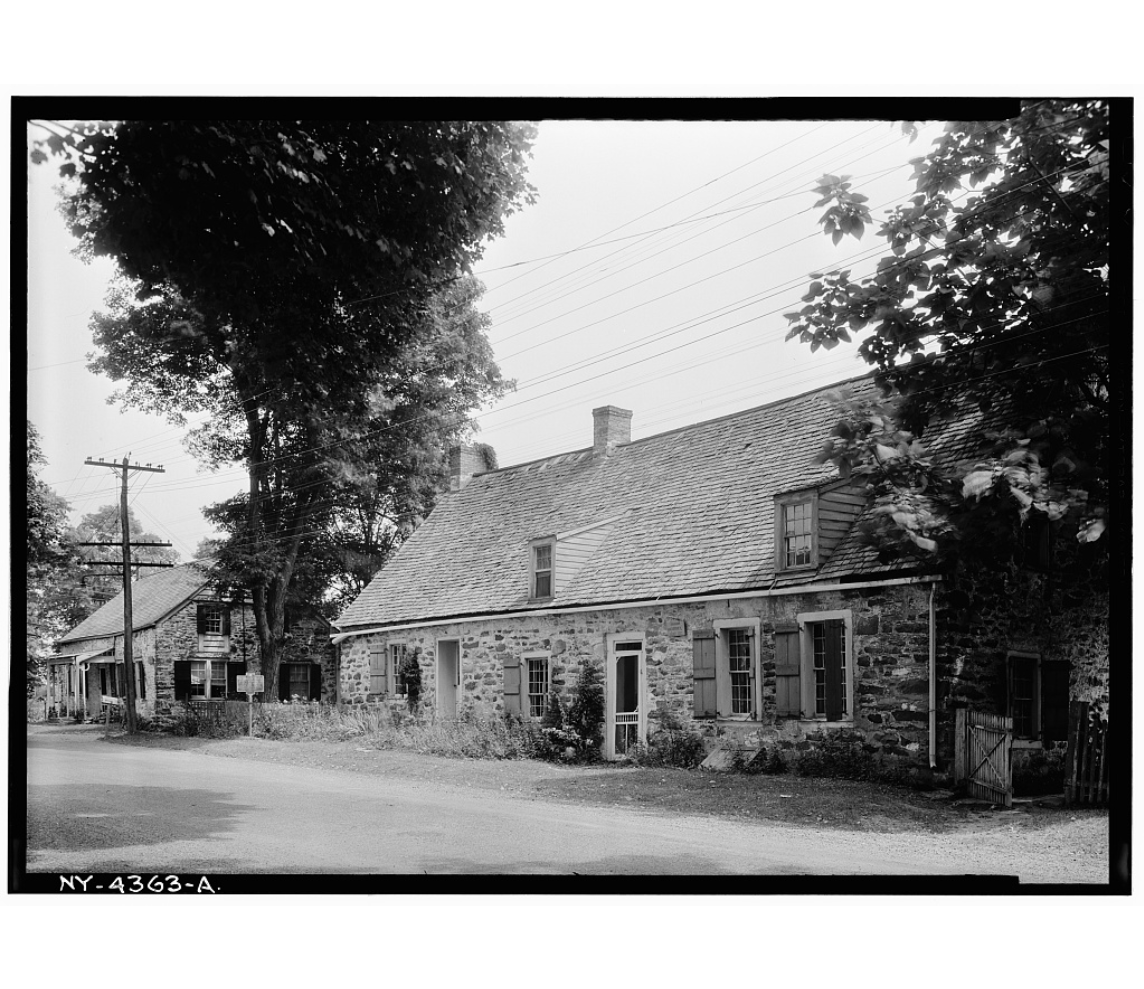
- Abraham Hasbrouck House
- Established: 1721
- Location: New Paltz, New York, United States
- Type: Living museum
- Owner: Huguenot Historical Society

The Abraham (Daniel) Hasbrouck House is a historic stone house located at 94 Huguenot Street in New Paltz, New York, United States. Built in three phases between 1721 and 1734, it is significant for its association with the early settlement of New Paltz by French Huguenots and as an example of evolving architectural styles in the Hudson Valley.

The house is currently opened and operated by the Huguenot Historical Society as a museum interpreting life in New Paltz between 1760 and 1775.

== History ==
The house's central section was constructed by Daniel Hasbrouck in 1721. Hasbrouck was the son of Abraham Hasbrouck (d. 1717), who immigrated to New Paltz, along with his brother, Jean, in the 1670s. At the time of the house's construction, Daniel shared the residence with Maria Deyo (d. 1741), his mother. The house's north room was added in 1728. In 1734, Daniel Hasbrouck married Wyntje Deyo; the south room was added that same year.

The house remained in the Hasbrouck family until 1911. In 1957, The Reformed Church of New Paltz purchased the property; in 1961, the house was purchased again by the Hasbrouck Family Association, who placed it under the ownership of the Huguenot Historical Society. As of 2025, the house is owned and operated by the Huguenot Historical Society as a museum interpreting life in New Paltz between 1760 and 1775. Ongoing restoration work focuses on preserving the house and presenting an accurate depiction of its historical appearance. A major interior restoration was completed in 2012.

In 2002, dendrochronology (tree-ring dating) revealed the actual construction dates of the three sections, correcting the previous belief that Abraham had built the house between 1692 and 1712.

== Architecture ==
The Abraham Hasbrouck House is a stone house built in three distinct phases, resulting in a linear, three-room floor plan. The house exemplifies the transition from traditional Dutch urban architecture with front gables to the side-gabled forms characteristic of rural 18th-century houses in the Hudson Valley.

The Central Section, built in 1721, is a one-room, one-and-a-half-story section, that features rubble masonry construction. The interior was originally painted a moderate reddish-brown. The ceiling planks were left unpainted. A notable feature is the restored "jambless" fireplace, which lacks sides or a mantel, with the chimney resting directly on the beams.

The North Room, built in 1728, includes a kitchen on the ground floor and a room above it, accessed by a later-added staircase. The "opkamer" (up-room) likely served as a private living space and bedchamber. The great chestnut beams in this section were turned sideways to maximize headroom.

The South Room, built in 1734, is the final addition, reflecting a transitional period with higher ceilings and smaller beams. The flooring, woodwork, and beams are original. The windows were enlarged at some point in the house's history.

== Current status and visiting information ==
The Abraham Hasbrouck House is open to the public as part of Historic Huguenot Street, a National Historic Landmark District. Guided tours are available and provide detailed information about the house, its occupants, and the history of New Paltz.

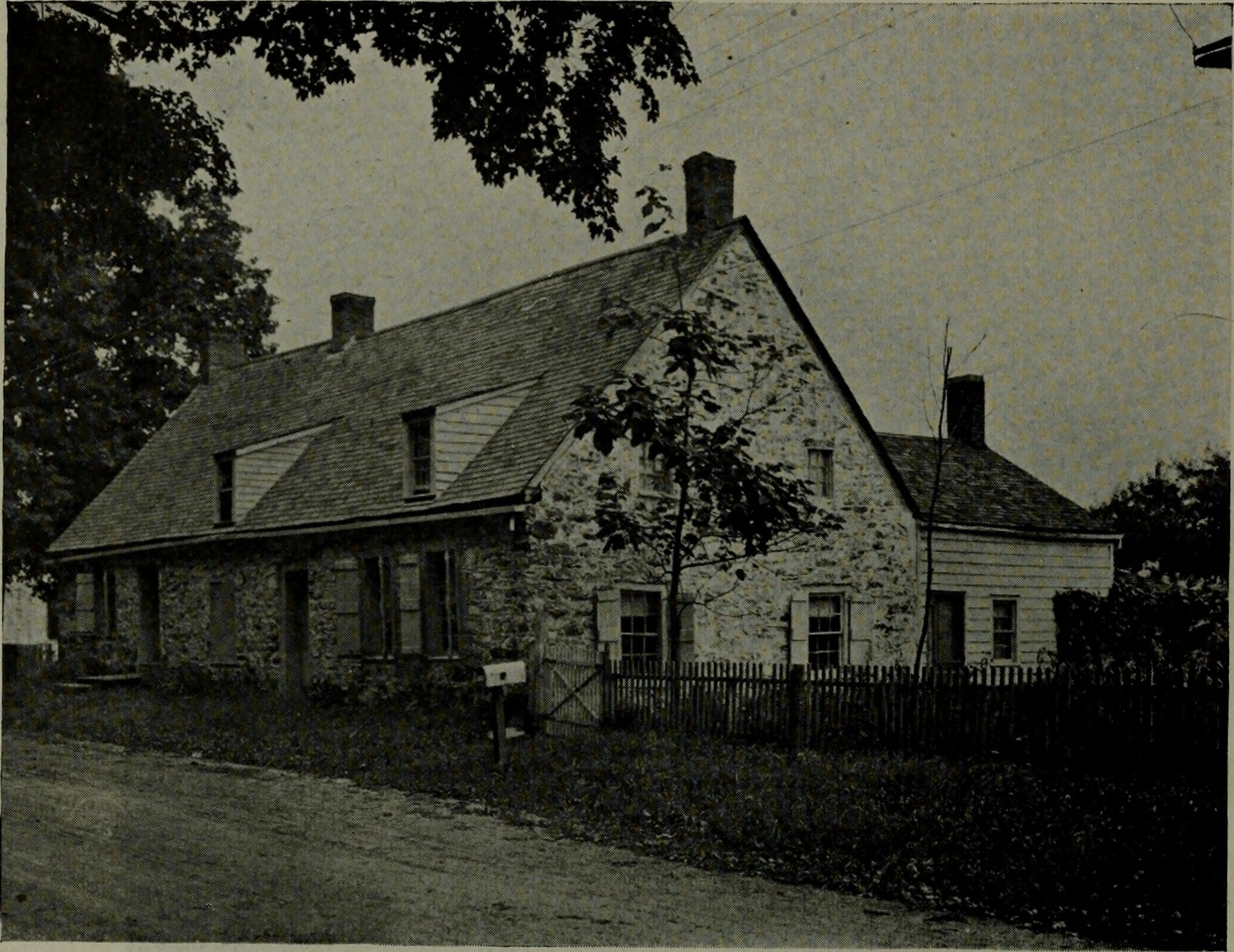
Photographed in 1919.

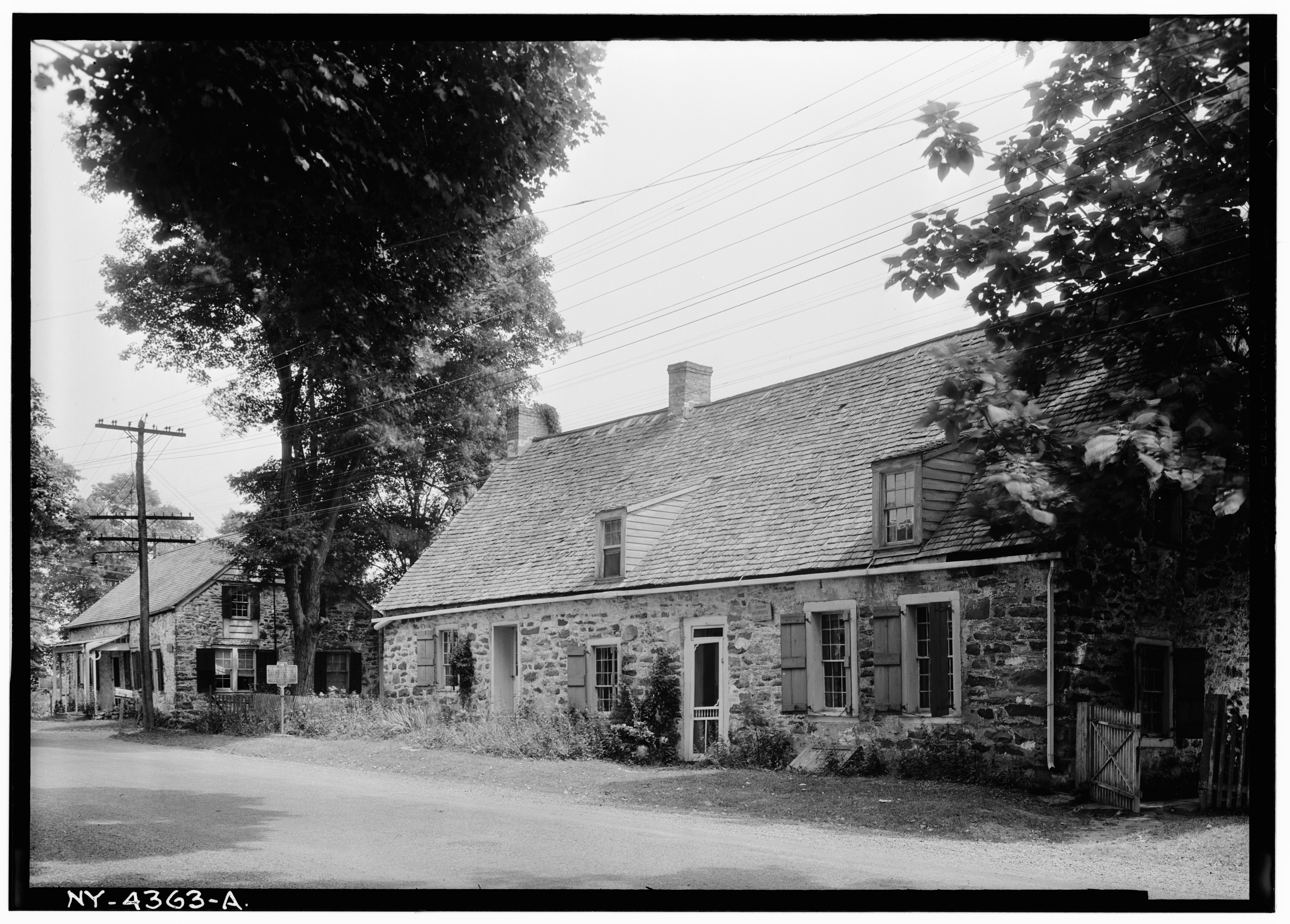
Photographed in 1933.

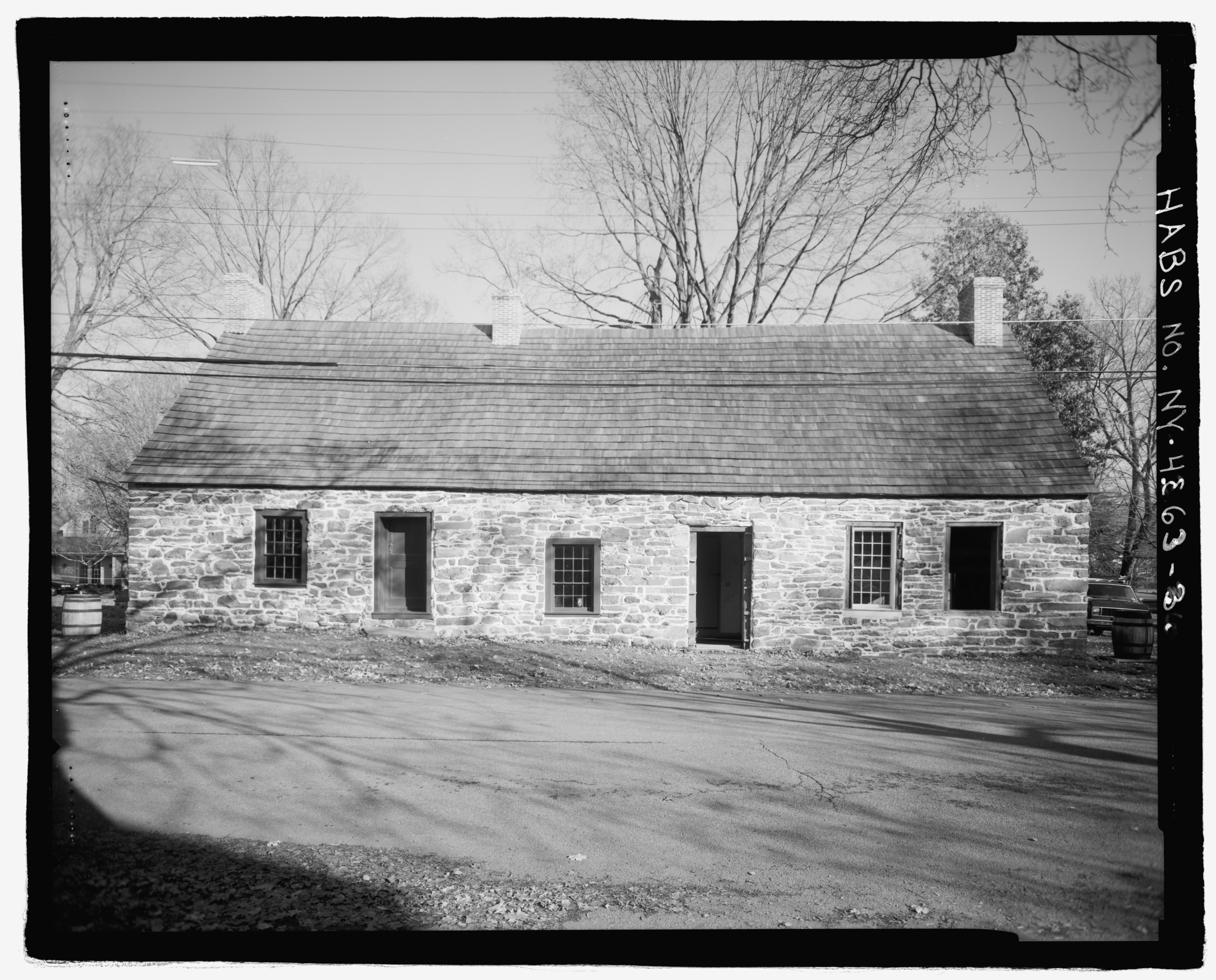
Photographed in 1933.

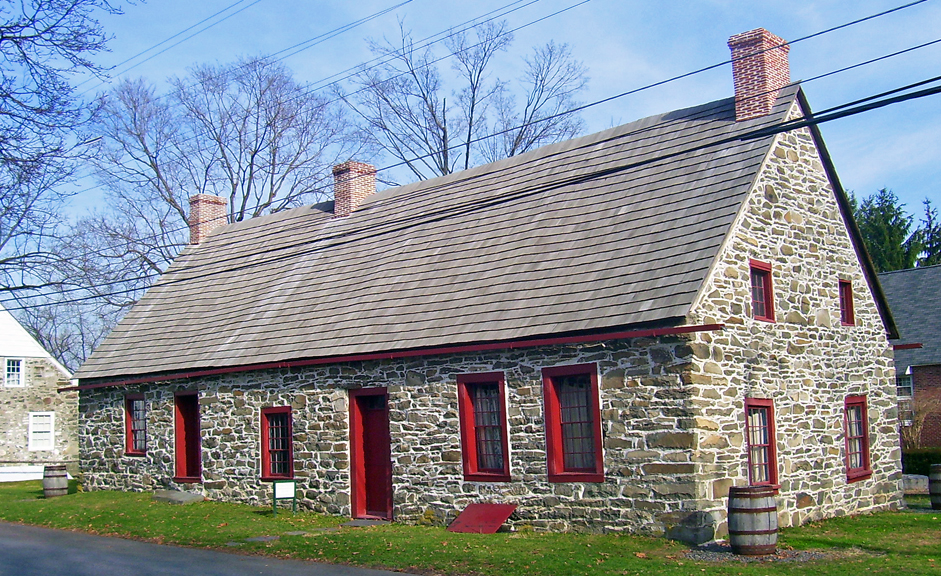
Photographed in 2006.

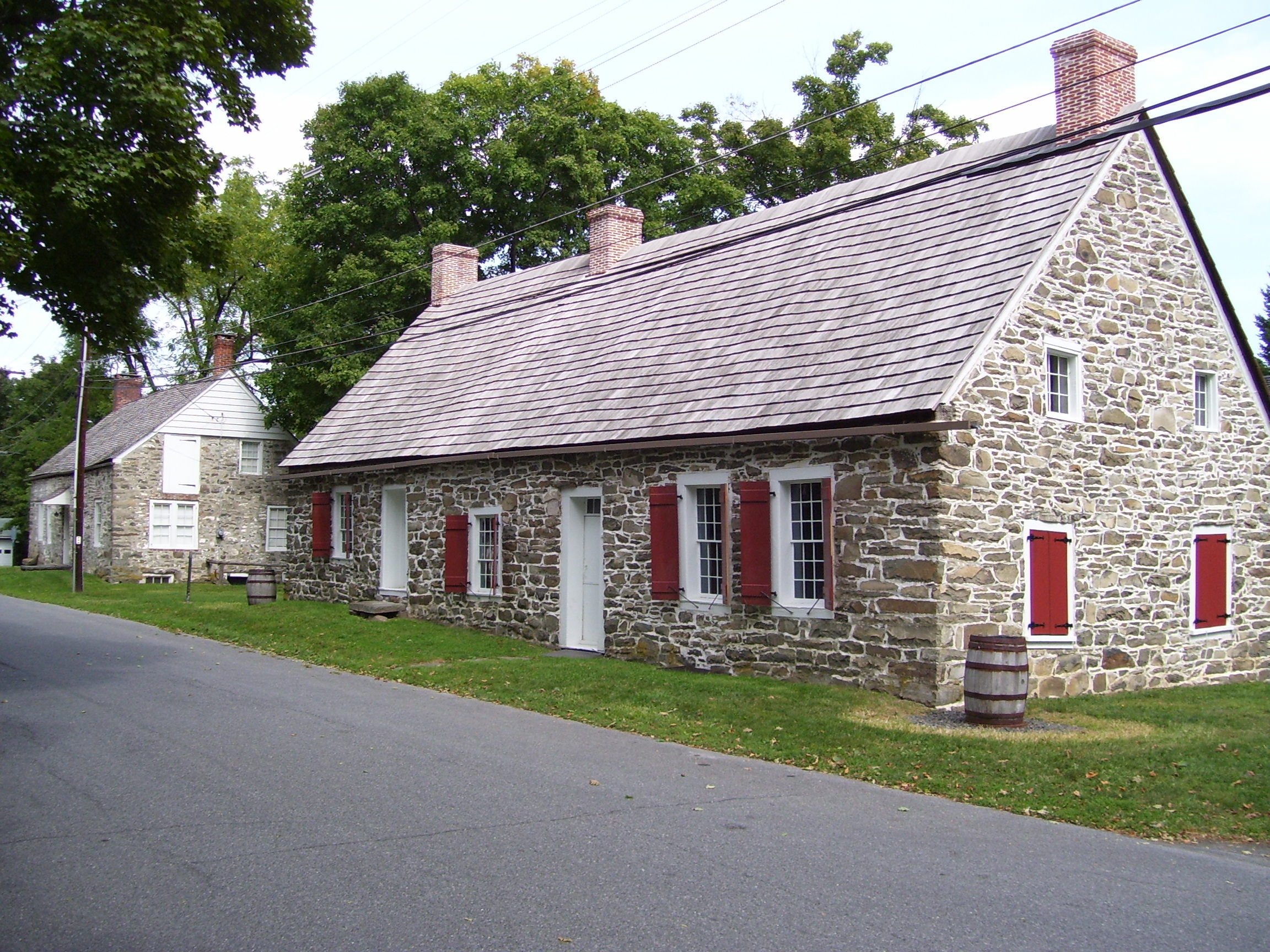
Photographed in 2010.

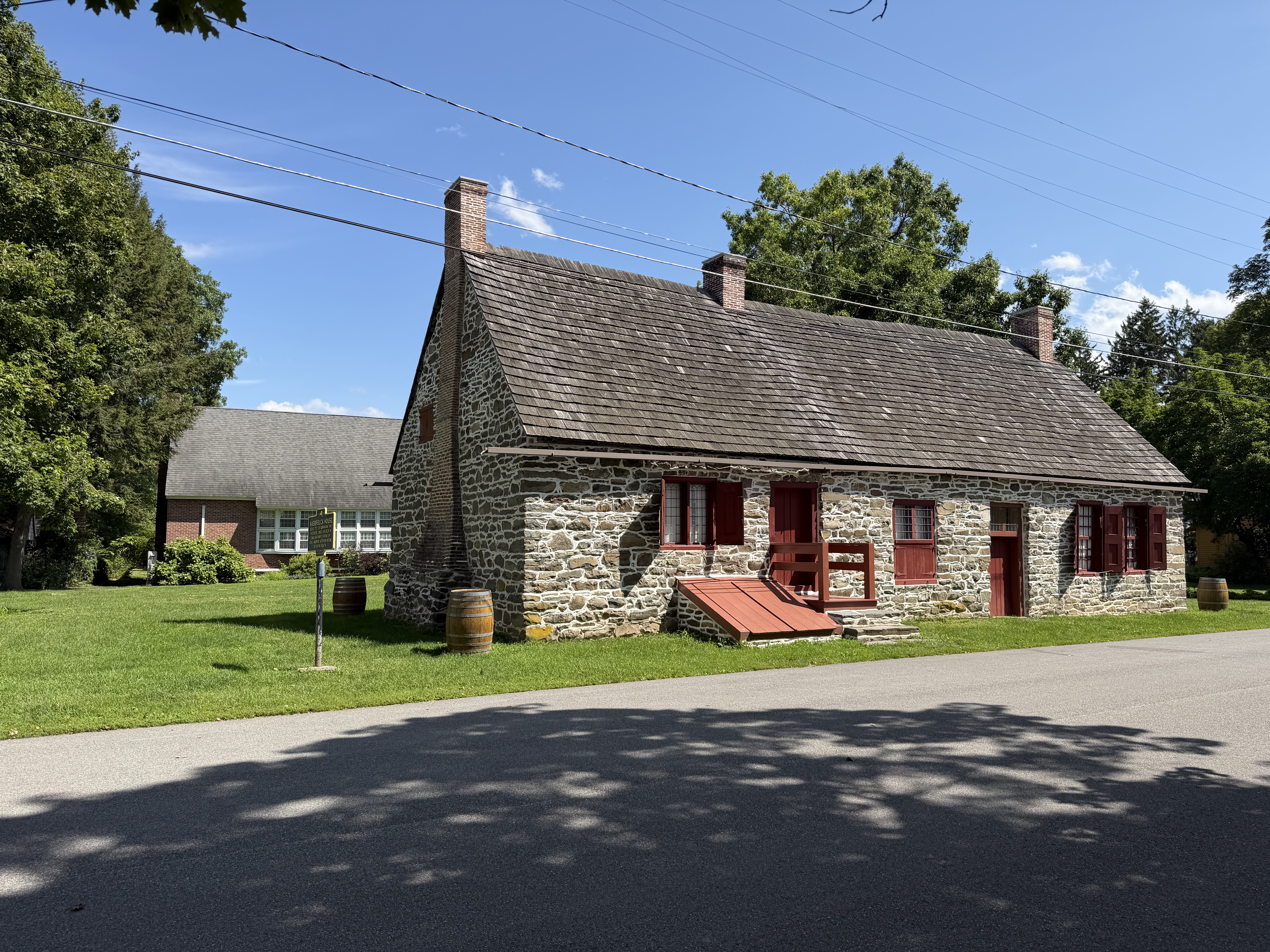
Photographed in 2026.
