= Stephen B. Leonard =

American politician (1793–1876)

Member of the U.S. House of Representatives from New York's 22nd district
- In office March 4, 1839 – March 3, 1841
- Preceded by: Cyrus Beers
- Succeeded by: Samuel Partridge
- In office March 4, 1835 – March 3, 1837
- Preceded by: Nicoll Halsey
- Succeeded by: Andrew DeWitt Bruyn

Personal details
- Born: Stephen Banks Leonard; April 15, 1793 New York City, U.S.
- Died: May 8, 1876 (aged 83) Owego, New York, U.S.
- Resting place: Presbyterian Church Burying Ground
- Party: Democratic
- Other political affiliations: Jacksonian
- Profession: Politician, newspaperman

Stephen Banks Leonard (April 15, 1793 – May 8, 1876) was an American newspaperman and politician who served two non-consecutive terms as a U.S. representative from New York from 1835 to 1837, and from 1839 to 1841.

== Biography ==
Born in New York City, Leonard attended the public schools. He moved with his parents to Owego, New York, and learned the printer's trade. He engaged in newspaper work in Albany, New York. He moved to New York City and subsequently returned to Owego. He was publisher and editor of the Owego Gazette 1814–1835. Trustee of the village of Owego. Supervisor and commissioner of excise. Trustee of Owego Academy for many years. He established the first stage route from Owego to Bath in 1816. Postmaster of Owego 1816–1820.

=== Congress ===
Leonard was elected as a Jacksonian to the Twenty-fourth Congress (March 4, 1835 – March 3, 1837).

Leonard was elected as a Democrat to the Twenty-sixth Congress (March 4, 1839 – March 3, 1841). He served as chairman of the Committee on Public Buildings and Grounds (Twenty-sixth Congress). He declined to be a candidate for reelection in 1840 to the Twenty-seventh Congress.

=== Later career and death ===
He engaged in mercantile and agricultural pursuits. Supervisor of Owego 1854–1856. Deputy United States marshal 1857–1861.

He died in Owego, New York, May 8, 1876. He was interred in the Presbyterian Church Burying Ground.

== Sources ==
- United States Congress. "Stephen B. Leonard (id: L000249)". Biographical Directory of the United States Congress.

U.S. House of Representatives
Preceded by Nicoll Halsey	Member of the U.S. House of Representatives from New York's 22nd congressional district 1835–1837	Succeeded by Andrew DeWitt Bruyn
Preceded by Cyrus Beers	Member of the U.S. House of Representatives from New York's 22nd congressional district 1839–1841	Succeeded by Samuel Partridge
