= Charles E. Jenkins =

American politician (1821/1822–1896)

Charles E. Jenkins (1821 or 1822 – September 21, 1896) was an American politician who was a member of the Wisconsin State Assembly and the New York State Assembly.

== Life and career ==
Jenkins was born in Albany, New York. His father, Lemuel Jenkins, was a member of the United States House of Representatives. In 1848, Jenkins moved to Milwaukee, Wisconsin.

He was a member of the Wisconsin State Assembly from 1850 to 1851. Additionally, he was a judge of the Milwaukee County, Wisconsin Court from 1854 to 1856. He was a member of the New York State Assembly in 1866.

Jenkins died in Yonkers, New York on September 21, 1896, at the age of 74.
