= Elizabeth Jenkins (judge) =

United States magistrate judge
- In office 1985–Present
- Nominated by: U.S. District Court - Middle District of Florida

Personal details
- Born: 1950 (age 75–76)

Elizabeth A. Jenkins (born 1950) is a U.S. magistrate judge for the Middle District of Florida. She was appointed by the U.S. District Court in 1985. She was reappointed in 1993.

Jenkins is a Florida native, she attended Vanderbilt University, and graduated with a bachelor's degree in 1971. In 1976 she graduated with her Juris Doctor from the University of Florida College of Law. Following graduation she served as an attorney with the Department of Justice from 1976 to 1978. After that she was an Assistant U.S. Attorney from 1978 to 1985.
