= Charles DeWitt =

American politician (1727–1787)

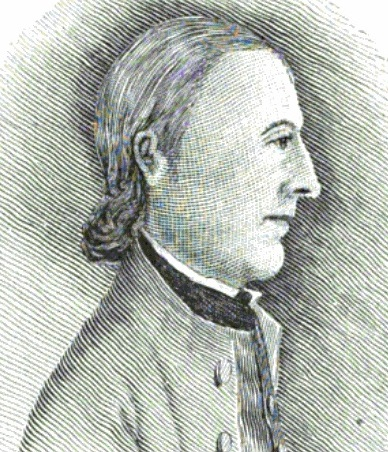
- Born: April 27, 1727; Kingston, New York, U.S.
- Died: August 27, 1787 (aged 60); Kingston, New York, U.S.
- Resting place: Dutch Reformed Cemetery; Hurley, New York
- Occupations: Miller, statesman
- Known for: Delegate to the Continental Congress
- Spouse: Blandina DuBois (after 1754)
- Children: 5
- Relatives: Charles G. DeWitt (grandson); Charles D. Bruyn (grandson); DeWitt Clinton (cousin); Simeon DeWitt (cousin)

Charles DeWitt (April 27, 1727 – August 27, 1787) was an American statesman and miller from the U.S. state of New York. He served as a delegate to the Continental Congress.

== Early life ==
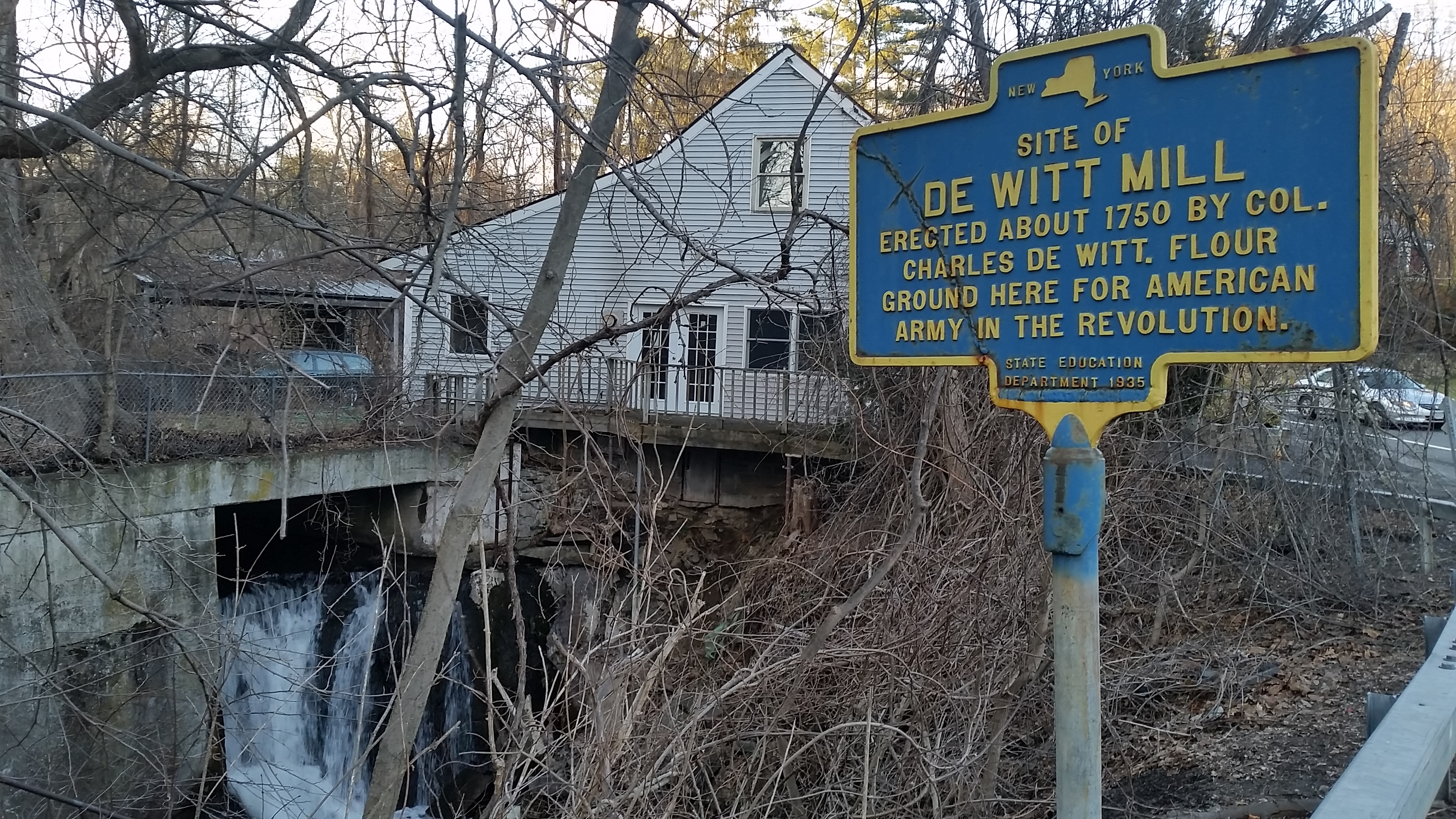
Site of the Mill Operated by De Witt

DeWitt was born in Kingston, New York, the eldest son of Johannes DeWitt and Mary (née Brodhead) DeWitt. Among his siblings was brother Andries J. DeWitt, who married Blandina Elmendorf Ten Eyck (parents of Jenneke (née DeWitt) Bruyn and grandparents of U.S. Representative Andrew DeWitt Bruyn). He was a first cousin once removed of Charles Clinton, DeWitt Clinton, George Clinton, Jr. and Jacob Hasbrouck DeWitt.

DeWitt attended school in Kingston and pursued classical studies. He helped his family operate a flour mill in Greenkill (in what is now Rosendale, New York). The first mill at the site was built by Mattys Mattysen Van Keuren in 1677. Van Keuren had no children and when he died the mill was passed on to his nephew, who was a DeWitt.

== Career ==
He was first elected to the New York General Assembly to represent Ulster County in 1768. He was returned to that seat in every election until the Assembly was replaced in the American Revolution by a Provisional Congress for the colony in 1775. That year he was one of the members who voted to approve the work of the Continental Congress. As the revolution drew near, and the Ulster militia was expanded, he was named Colonel of the 2nd Ulster Militia regiment on December 21, 1775.

DeWitt served in the New York Provincial Congress from 1775 to 1777 while continuing his militia duties. In the New York Provincial Congress he served on the committee that drafted the state's first constitution. He also served on the Committee of Safety. After active warfare slowed, he was elected to the New York Assembly under the new government. He served in the assembly from 1781 to 1785 and 1785–1787. The assembly sent him as a delegate to the Continental Congress in 1781 and 1784.

DeWitt supplied a great deal of flour to the Continental Army from his grist mill on the Greenkill.

== Personal life ==
On December 20, 1754, DeWitt was married to Blandina DuBois (1731–1765) in Hurley. She was the daughter of Gerrit DuBois and Margaret Elemendorf, and was a great-granddaughter of Louis DuBois, a Huguenot who was one of the earliest settlers and founders of New Paltz, New York. Together, the couple had five children:

- Johannes "John" Charles DeWitt (1755–1833), who served as the Town of Hurley supervisor for three different terms (1788-1793, 1796–1797, 1807–1808); he married Cornelia Kantein in 1778.
- Margrietje "Margaret" DeWitt (1758–1827), who married Johannes Bruyn (1750–1814), a New York Assemblymen from Ulster County, a presidential elector for New York, and a member of New York State Senate who was the son of Jacobus Bruyn.
- Maria DeWitt (1760–1798), who married Jacobus "James" Hasbrouck in Kingston in 1783.
- Gerret DeWitt (1762–1846), who married Catharine Ten Eyck (1765–1840), a daughter of Matthew Ten Eyck and Cornelia (née Wynkoop) Ten Eyck, in 1786.
- Ann DeWitt

He died on August 27, 1787, in Kingston and is interred in the Dutch Reformed Cemetery in Hurley, New York. He wrote his will on July 7, 1776, as he prepared to set out for the defense of New York City. He left the mill to his son Gerret, who expanded it in 1806, and the water-powered mill would continue in operation until 1922.

=== Descendants ===
DeWitt's grandson, Charles G. DeWitt, served in the U.S. Congress. Another grandson, Charles DeWitt Bruyn (1784–1849), was a New York Assemblymen from Sullivan and Ulster counties from 1821 to 1822. His great-grandson, Matthew Pawling DeWitt, served as Hurley Town Supervisor from 1856 to 1857, and Matthew's son (Charles's great-great-grandson), Christopher Newkirk DeWitt, served in this position from 1880 to 1886 and 1896–1899. Another great-great-grandson, Matthew TenEyck DeWitt, was Hurley Supervisor on multiple occasions (1910-1911, 1914–1915, 1924–1927, and 1933–1935, his death). Another great-grandson was David M. De Witt.
