= John Rapalje =

New York land owner (1728–1802)

John Rapalje (1728–1802) of Brooklyn, New York, was an active loyalist and a member of the Committee of Correspondence in 1774 and of the House of Assembly in 1775. In 1779, his land was confiscated under the "Act of Attainer" and he left the country. He died in England in 1802.

== Life before the War ==
Rapalje owned a large estate, which consisted primarily of land. It is listed that he owned 3 male and 2 female slaves in April 1755. There is evidence that he did have one son, also named John Rapalje. Of the general classes of Loyalists in New York, Rapalje was considered to be of the many assemblymen of the royal officials. The royal official class was made up of the governor, lieutenant-governors, councilors, assemblymen, judges, military and naval officers, and other royal agents. The other classes of which Loyalists fell into were large land proprietors, professional classes, wealthy commercial classes, conservative farmers, colonial politicians, and the other conservative masses of no trade or all trade.

== Political views during the War ==
In 1775, Rapalje had a seat in the House of Assembly, and was one of the fourteen who, during the recess that year, addressed General Gage at Boston on the subject of the war. In February 1775, a motion was made in the General Assembly of New York by Philip Schuyler, Esq. to adopt and approve the proceedings of the late Congress. This motion occasioned violent debates. Rapalje opposed and voted against the acts of Congress, alongside John Cruger, James DeLancey, Jacob Walton, James Jauncey, Daniel Kissam, William Nicoll, Benjamin Seaman, Christopher Billop, Isaac Wilins, Frederick Phillipse, Samuel Gale, and Leonard Van Kleck. He was apprehended by order of George Washington and transported to Connecticut in August, 1776. He was allowed to return to Long Island on parole.

== Confiscation of land ==
On October 22, 1779, the "Act of Attainder," a new bill on confiscation, became law that declared that fifty-nine people were ipso facto guilty of felony; that they should be attained and their property forfeited to the state, and if found within the state, they were to be executed. Rapalje was one of the 24 esquires who were listed. His estate was estimated at £40,000 in value.

== Life after the War ==
After his property was confiscated, he departed the country, going either to England or Nova Scotia. In 1787, he sent two of his slaves, Eve and Suke, to George Leonard of Nova Scotia. The "determination on claims" by the commissioners in America began December 5, 1785 and closed December 19, 1788, in which Loyalists were able to list their claims of loss during the war, including both personal loss and real estate. Rapalje listed that $106,000 was lost, and he was compensated $53,000. He died in England in 1802 at the age of 74.
