= The Kingston Academy =

The Kingston Academy (TKA)

Location
- Richmond Road; Kingston upon Thames, Greater London, KT2 5PE; England; 51.4238°N 0.3023°W

Information
- Type: Free School
- Motto: Going Beyond What Schools Ordinarily Do
- Established: 2015
- Trust: Kingston Educational Trust
- Department for Education URN: 141862 Tables
- Ofsted: Reports
- Headteacher: Sophie Cavanagh
- Gender: Coeducational
- Age: 11 to 19
- Enrollment: 1,213
- Capacity: 1,188
- Houses: Berners Lee; Curie; Hawking; Lovelace
- Website: www.thekingstonacademy.org

The Kingston Academy (TKA), is a co-educational secondary free school located in the London Borough of Kingston upon Thames, south-west London, established in September 2015.

TKA underwent refurbishment and expansion which was completed in September 2019.

TKA's facilities include:

- a full-sized, fully-equipped sports hall and dance studio
- a lecture theatre
- a dining atrium
- a library
- modern science laboratories

TKA is governed by the Kingston Educational Trust, a partnership between Kingston University, Kingston College and the Royal Borough of Kingston.
