= Charles G. DeWitt =

American politician

Charles G. Dewitt

United States Chargé d'Affaires, Guatemala
- In office December 17, 1833 – January 1, 1839
- Preceded by: John Williams
- Succeeded by: Elijah Hise

Member of the U.S. House of Representatives from New York's 7th district
- In office March 4, 1829 – March 3, 1831
- Preceded by: George O. Belden
- Succeeded by: John C. Brodhead

Personal details
- Born: Charles Gerrit DeWitt; November 7, 1789 Kingston, New York, U.S.
- Died: April 12, 1839 (aged 49) Newburgh, New York, U.S.
- Resting place: Dutch Reformed Cemetery; Hurley, New York
- Party: Jacksonian
- Relations: Charles DeWitt (grandfather); Henry Richard DeWitt (great nephew)
- Profession: Lawyer, politician

Charles Gerrit DeWitt (November 7, 1789 – April 12, 1839) was an American lawyer, diplomat, and politician from the U.S. state of New York. He served as a member of the United States House of Representatives and as United States Chargé d'Affaires to Guatemala.

== Early life ==
DeWitt was born in Kingston, New York. He studied law and began the practice of law in Kingston. He was a clerk in the Navy Department and published a newspaper, The Ulster Sentinel, beginning in 1826.

=== Congress ===
He represented New York's 7th district as a Jacksonian in the 21st Congress, serving from March 4, 1829, to March 3, 1831.

=== Later career ===
After leaving Congress he resumed the practice of law. On March 22, 1831, he was appointed by Secretary of the Treasury Samuel D. Ingham as one of three Commissioners of Insolvency for the Southern District of New York. He was appointed United States Chargé d'Affaires to Guatemala in 1833, and served in that position until 1839.

=== Death and burial ===
DeWitt committed suicide on board a steamboat in Newburgh, New York on April 12, 1839, and is interred in the Dutch Reformed Cemetery in Hurley, New York.

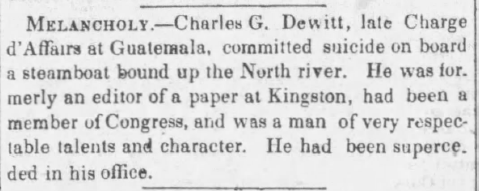
The Baltimore Sun on DeWitt's death

== Family life ==
DeWitt's father Gerrit DeWitt was a miller, and his grandfather Charles DeWitt was a delegate to the Continental Congress. His great-nephew Henry Richard DeWitt was a New York state assemblyman.

== Notes ==
U.S. House of Representatives
Preceded by George O. Belden	Member of the U.S. House of Representatives from New York's 7th congressional district 1829–1831	Succeeded by John C. Brodhead
Diplomatic posts
Preceded by John Williams	United States Chargé d'Affaires, Guatemala; December 17, 1833 – January 1, 1839	Succeeded by Elijah Hise
