= James William Beekman Jr. =

American lawyer and philanthropist

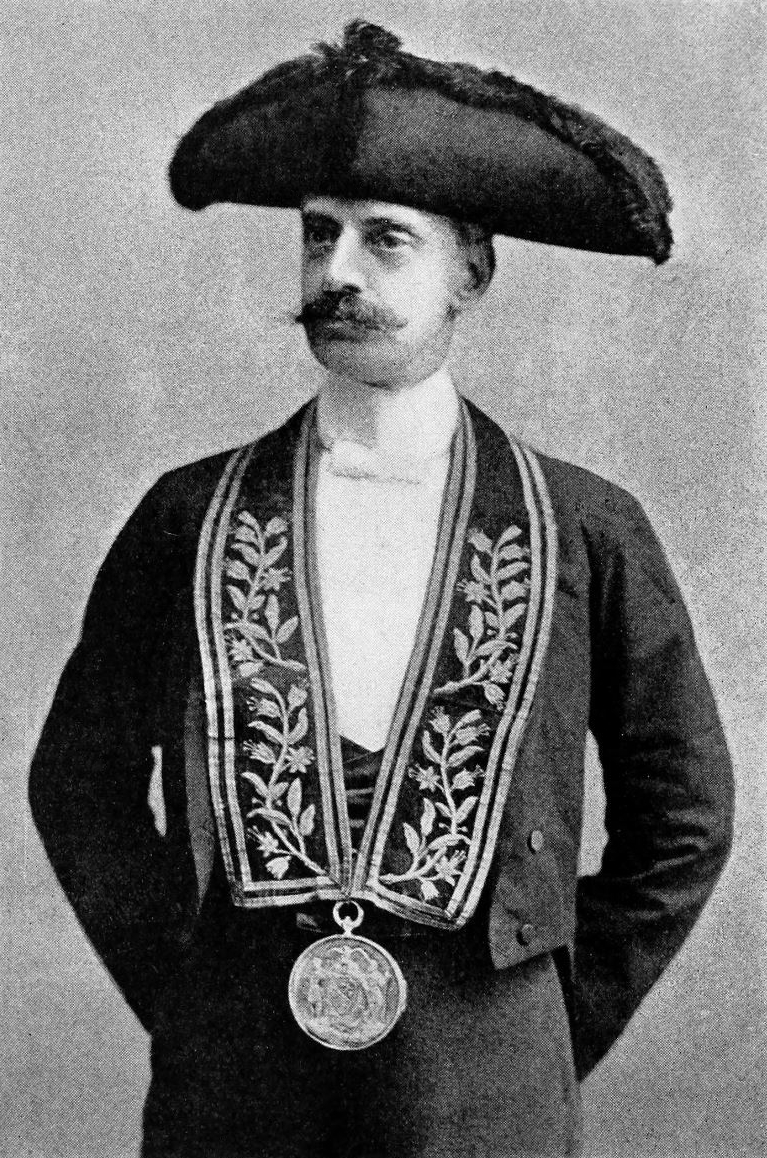

31st President of the Saint Nicholas Society of the City of New York
- In office 1890–1891
- Preceded by: Edward Schell
- Succeeded by: Frederic James de Peyster

Personal details
- Born: November 4, 1847 Mount Pleasant, New York, U.S.
- Died: August 7, 1908 (aged 60) Oyster Bay, New York, U.S.
- Relations: Phillip Milledoler (grandfather)
- Parent(s): James William Beekman; Abian Milledoler Beekman
- Education: Columbia Law School
- Awards: Order of Orange-Nassau

James William Beekman Jr. (November 4, 1847 – August 7, 1908) was an American lawyer and philanthropist.

== Early life ==
Beekman was born on November 4, 1847, in Mount Pleasant, New York. He was one of five children born to James William Beekman (1815–1877) and Abian Ann Steele (née Milledoler) Beekman (1819–1897). Among his siblings was Catherine Beekman, who married William W. Hoppin, Jr. (son of Governor William W. Hoppin); Gerard Beekman; Philip Milledoller Beekman, who died young; and Cornelia Augusta Beekman. His father was a New York State Assemblyman and Senator who also served as the vice president of the New York Hospital.

His maternal grandparents were Margaret (née Steele) Milledoler and Phillip Milledoler, the president of Rutgers University. His paternal grandparents were Catharine (née Saunders) Beekman and Gerard Beekman, himself the son of James Beekman, a prominent merchant. Beekman was a direct descendant of Gerardus Beekman, acting Mayor of New York City, and Wilhelmus Beekman, who sailed to New Netherlands with Peter Stuyvesant and was an officer of the Dutch West India Company.

== Career ==
Beekman graduated from Columbia Law School, and, after being admitted to the bar in 1871, he built up a large practice with an office located at 7 East 42nd Street. Beekman was devoted to various charities, including as a trustee of the New York Hospital and a member of the Executive Committee of the New-York Historical Society. He was a member of many clubs and patriotic societies, including the Downtown Club, the Union Club of the City of New York, the Knickerbocker Club, the University Club of New York, the New York Yacht Club, the Seawanhaka Corinthian Yacht Club and the Century Club.

After his father's death in 1877, he inherited his father's Madison Avenue residence and his elder brother Gerard, also a lawyer, inherited The Cliffs, the family estate in Oyster Bay, New York, designed by Henry G. Harrison. Both brothers and their sister Nellie lived at The Cliff's in the summer.

In 1890, Beekman became the 31st President of the Saint Nicholas Society of the City of New York, an organization his father was the 17th president of from 1868 to 1869. Due to his work with the Saint Nicholas Society, he was recognized by Wilhelmina, the Queen of the Netherlands, and made a Knight of the Order of Orange-Nassau in honor of "his services to the Officers of the Dutch Man-of-War Van Speijk during the Columbian Naval Review" in 1893.

== Personal life ==
Beekman, who did not marry, died at The Cliffs in Oyster Bay on Friday evening, August 7, 1908. His funeral was held at the Reformed Dutch Church at Fifth Avenue and 29th Street in New York.
