= Henry Rutgers Beekman =

Henry Rutgers Beekman may refer to:

- Henry Rutgers Beekman (judge) (1845–1900), American lawyer, judge, and government official
- Henry Rutgers Beekman (artist) (1880–1938), American watercolorist

== See also ==
- Henry Beekman (1687–1775), colonial American politician and landowner
