= Beekman family =

Family of Dutch descent

Beekman
- Country: United States
- Origin: Netherlands
- Connected families: Livingston family Stuyvesant family Van Cortlandt family Bayard family
- Motto: Mens conscia Recti

The Beekman family (sometimes spelled Beeckman) is a family of Dutch descent that was prominent during the 17th, 18th, and 19th centuries in the area now known as the state of New York. Members of this family played a critical role in the formation of the United States and served as leaders in business, politics and society.

== History ==
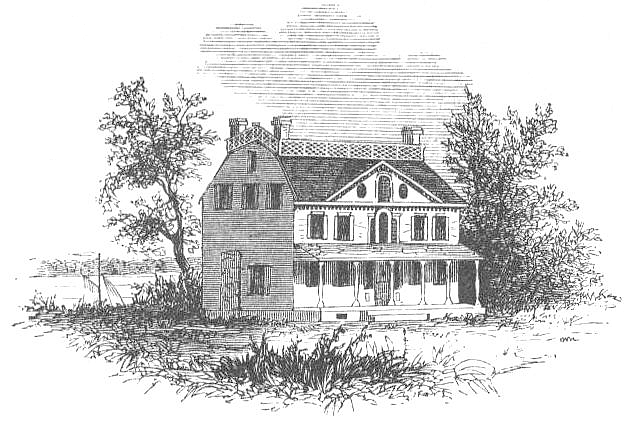
Mount Pleasant, the James Beekman mansion in Manhattan (from Valentine's Manual, 1860)

The name Beekman is from "beck," the Dutch word for "mouth," the English "beak". The most logical explanation is the literal translation for Beek which means of “brook” or “rivolet” in Dutch. "According to Putnam's Historic New York, 'Beekman or the man of the brook; this interpretation of the name was recognized by heralds during the reign of King James I of England when the arms granted to the Rev. Mr. Beekman, grandfather of William, as a coat of arms, a rivulet running between roses." The crest is three feathers on a helmet of steel represented in profile. The motto is: Mens conscia Recti."

The progenitor of the American Beekmans, Wilhelmus Beekman of Overijssel, came to New Amsterdam in the Dutch province of New Netherlands in 1647. The Beekman estates were in Flatbush, Long Island. His ancestors were residents of the country of the Rhine, and a branch of the family were Barons of Belgium. Wilhelmus' grandfather, Cornelius Beekman, was a wealthy burgher of Cologne, who resided on the Rhine in Germany.

== Notable members ==
- Wilhelmus Beekman (1623–1707), Treasurer of the Dutch West India Company, Governor of Delaware and Pennsylvania, 1653/58-1663
- Hendrick Beekman (1652–1716), Governor of Delaware, Mayor of New York City, namesake of the town of Beekman, New York
- Gerardus Beekman (1653–1723), colonel, surgeon, Governor of the Province of New York
- Henry Beekman (1687–1775), prominent colonial American politician and landowner
- James Beekman (1732–1807), New York City merchant
- John P. Beekman (1788–1861), New York physician and politician
- Thomas Beekman (1790–1870), American politician, U.S. Representative from New York
- James William Beekman (1815–1877), New York City landowner
- Henry Rutgers Beekman (1845–1900), justice of the Supreme Court of New York and New York City Parks Commissioner
- Daniel H. Beekman (1874–1951), New Jersey attorney, judge, banker, and Democratic politician.

== Family tree ==
Beekman family members
- Rev. Gerardus Beekman (1558–1625) m. Agnes Stunning (1557–1614)
  - Martin "Hendrick" Beekman (1585–1642) m. (1) Gertruyd Gommersbach (1589–1619) m. (2) 1621: Maritje "Mary" Baudartius (1600–1630); m. (3) Alida Ottenbeek (b. 1605)
    - Gerardus Beekman (1622–1678) m. Joanna Plautius
    - Wilhelmus Beekman (1623–1707) m. 1649 Catalina de Boogh
      - Maria Beekman (1650–1679) m. Nicholas William Stuyvesant
      - Hendrick Beekman (1652–1716) m. Jannetje "Johanna" (née de Loper) Davidson (1650–1743)
        - Wilhelmus "William" Beekman (1682–1700)
        - Catryntie "Catharine" Beekman (1683–1745) m. (1): Cornelius Exveen m. (2): Johannes "John" Rutsen m. (3): Albert Pawling
        - Henry Beekman (1687–1775) m. (1): Janet Livingston (d. 1724); m. (2) Gertrude Van Cortlandt
          - Margaret Beekman (1724–1800) m. Robert Livingston (1718–1775)
            - Robert R. Livingston (1746–1813) m. Mary Stevens
            - Janet Livingston (d. 1824) m. Gen. Richard Montgomery (1738–1775)
            - Margaret Livingston (1749–1823) m. Thomas Tillotson (1750–1832)
            - Henry Beekman Livingston (1750–1831) m. Anne Hume Shippen (1763–1841)
            - Catharine Livingston m. Freeborn Garrettson
            - John R. Livingston (1755–1851) m. 1779: Margaret Sheafe; m. (2) 1789: Eliza McEvers
            - Gertrude Livingston (1757–1833) m. Morgan Lewis (1754–1844)
            - Joanna Livingston (1759–1827) m. Peter R. Livingston (1766–1847)
            - Alida Livingston (1761–1822) m. John Armstrong Jr. (1758–1843)
            - Edward Livingston (1764–1836) m. (1) 1788: Mary McEvers; m. (2) Madame Louise Moreau de Lassy (née Davezac) in 1805
        - Cornelia Beekman (1693–1742) m. Gilbert Livingston.
            - Margaret Livingston m. Peter Stuyvesant
            - Joanna Livingston m. Pierre Van Cortlandt
      - Gerardus Beekman (1653–1723) m. 1677: Magdalena Abeel (c. 1662–1745)
        - Divertje "Deborah" Beekman (1674–1737) m. Theunis Hendricksen Wiltse (1674–1741)
        - William Beekman (1684–1770) m. Catharine Delanoy (1691–1765)
          - James Beekman (1732–1807) m. 1752: Janneke "Jane" Keteltas (1734–1817)
            - Abraham Keteltas Beekman (1756–1816) m. Johanna Beekman
            - James Beekman Jr. (1758–1837) m. Lydia Watkins Drew
            - Jane Beekman (b. 1760) m. Stephen Van Cortlandt
            - Catharine "Caty" Beekman (b. 1762) m. Elisha Boudinot
            - Mary Beekman (b. 1765) m. Stephen N. Bayard
            - John Beekman (1768–1843) m. Mary Elizabeth Goad Bedlow (1771–1848)
              - William Fenwick Beekman (1809–1872) m. Catherine Alexander Neilson (1814–1892)
                - Henry Rutgers Beekman (1845–1900) m. Isabella Lawrence
                  - Henry Rutgers Beekman (1880–1937)
            - Gerard Beekman (1774–1833) m. Catharine Saunders (1785–1835)
              - James William Beekman (1815–1877) m. Abian Ann Steele Milledoler (1819–1897)
                - Catherine Beekman (1841–1923) m. William W. Hoppin Jr. (1840–1913)
                - Gerard Beekman (1842–1918)
                - Philip Milledoller Beekman (1845–1846)
                - James William Beekman Jr. (1847–1908)
                - Cornelia Augusta Beekman (1849–1917)
        - Adrian Beekman (1682–1705) m. Aletta Lispenard (c. 1686–1705)
        - Gerardus Beekman (1693–1746) m. (1): Anna Maria van Horne (1696–1726); m. (2) 1727: Catharine Provoost
          - Gerardus Garret Beekman (1719–1796) m. Anna van Horne (1726–1746)
            - Gerard (Gerardus) Garret Beekman Jr. (1746–1822) m. 1772: Cornelia Van Cortlandt (1753–1847)
              - Gerard Garret Beekman (1773-1836)
              - Pierre Van Cortlandt Beekman (1777-1796)
              - Ann Beekman (1778–1857) m. 1803: Frederick de Peyster (1758–1834)
                - Frederic de Peyster II (1796–1882) m. (1) 1820: Mary Justina Watts; m. (2) 1839: Maria Antoinette (née Kane) Hone
                  - John Watts de Peyster (1821–1907) m. Estelle Livingston (1819–1898)
              - Dr. Stephen David Beekman (Beeckman) (1782-1856)
      - Cornelia Beekman (1655–1679) m. 1674: Isaac Van Vleck
      - Johannes Beekman (1656–1751) m. Aeltje Thomas Popinga
        - Thomas Beekman (1689–1759) m. Maria Wynkoop (1693–1758)
          - Johannes Beekman (1723–1792) m. Lydia Van Keurew (c. 1729–1795)
            - John J. Beekman (1761–1795) m. Annatje Pruyn
              - John P. Beekman (1788–1861) m. 1821: Eliza Griffith Clark (1792–1875)
              - Thomas Beekman (1790–1870) m. Lydia Van Schaack
    - Marteen Hendricksz Beekman (1624–1711) m. Susanna Janz Labattie
      - Hendrick Beekman (1645–c. 1735) m. Annetje Quackenbosch
        - Susanna Beekman m. Tunis Jans Van Middleswaert (1682–1742)
        - Maria Beekman (1697–1744) m. Pieter Fonda (b. 1697)
      - Johannes Beekman (1657–1732) m. (1) Machtelt Schermerhorn; m. (2) Eva Vinhagen
        - Johannes Beekman Jr. (1684–1741) m. 1714: Esther Wendell (b. 1686)
        - Jacob Beekman (1685–1739) m. 1714: Debora Hansen
          - Johannes Jacobse Beekman (1733–1802) m. 1759: Maria Sanders (1740–1794)
            - Deborah Beekman (1763–1791) m. 1787: John De Peyster Douw (1756–1835)
        - Maritje "Mary" Beekman (b. 1692) m. 1710: Arnout Schermerhorn (1686–1749)
          - Johannes "John" Schermerhorn (1715–1768) m. Sarah Cannon (1721–1762)
            - Peter Schermerhorn (1749–1826) m. 1771: Elizabeth Bussing
              - Abraham Schermerhorn (1783–1850) m. Helen Van Courtlandt White (1792–1881)
                - Caroline Webster Schermerhorn (1830–1908) m. William Backhouse Astor Jr. (1829–1892)
        - Martin Beekman (1695–c. 1755) m. 1721: Geertruy Visscher
          - Johannes Beekman (1722–1790) m. (1) 1754: Maria Nicolls; m. (2) 1764: Elizabeth Douw
          - Eva Beekman (1734–1803) m. Abraham Schuyler (1735–1812)
        - Hendrick Beekman (1707–1755) m. Annetje "Anna" Swits (b. 1712)
          - Johannes Beekman (1738–1794) m. Hendrickje van Buren (b. c. 1746)
            - Henry Beekman (1774–1857) m. Catherine McPhaedris Livingston (1789–1863)
              - Helen Smith Beekman (1817–1896) m. John Andrew Graham (1808–1883)
              - Gilbert Livingston Beeckman (1823–1874) m. Margaret Atherton Foster (1832–1904)
                - Katherine Livingston Beeckman (1855–1941) m. Louis Lasher Lorillard (1849–1910)
                - Margaret Atherton Beeckman (1861–1951) m. (1) Campbell Steward (1852–1936)
                - Martha Beeckman (1863–1951) m. Amos Tuck French (1863–1941)
                - Robert Livingston Beeckman (1866–1935) m. (1) 1902: Eleanor Thomas (d. 1920); m. (2) 1923: Edna (née Marston) Burke

== Gallery ==
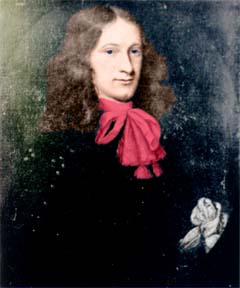
Wilhelmus Beekman

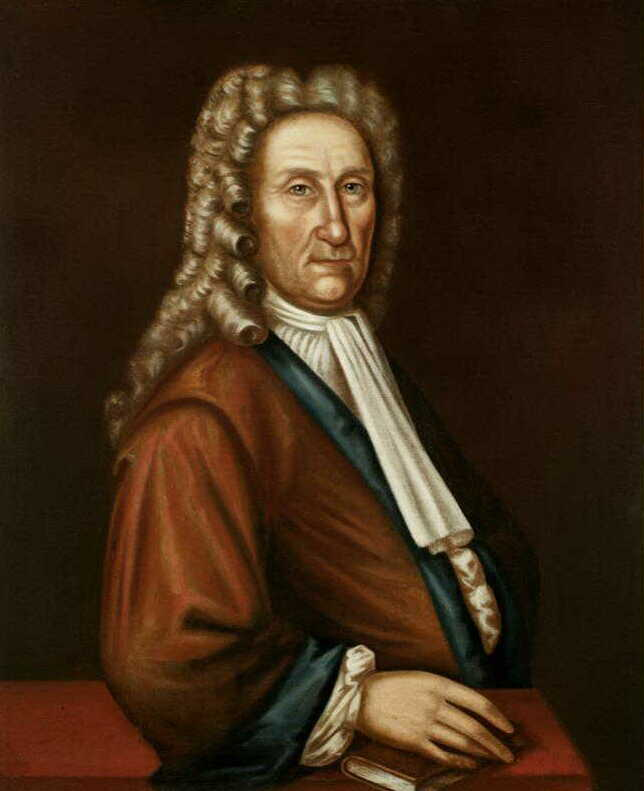
Gerardus Beekman

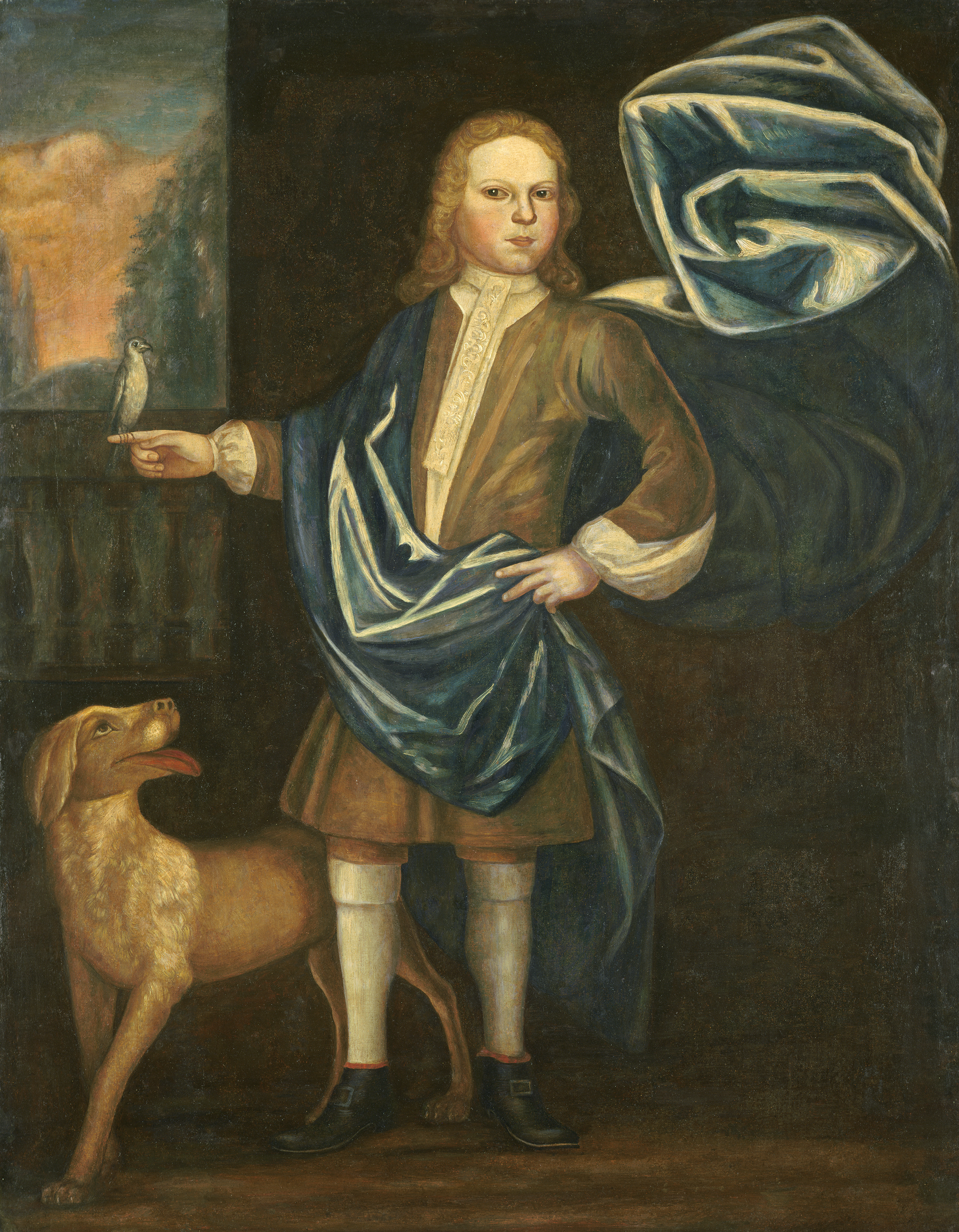
Boy of the Beekman Family, c. 1720, National Gallery of Art

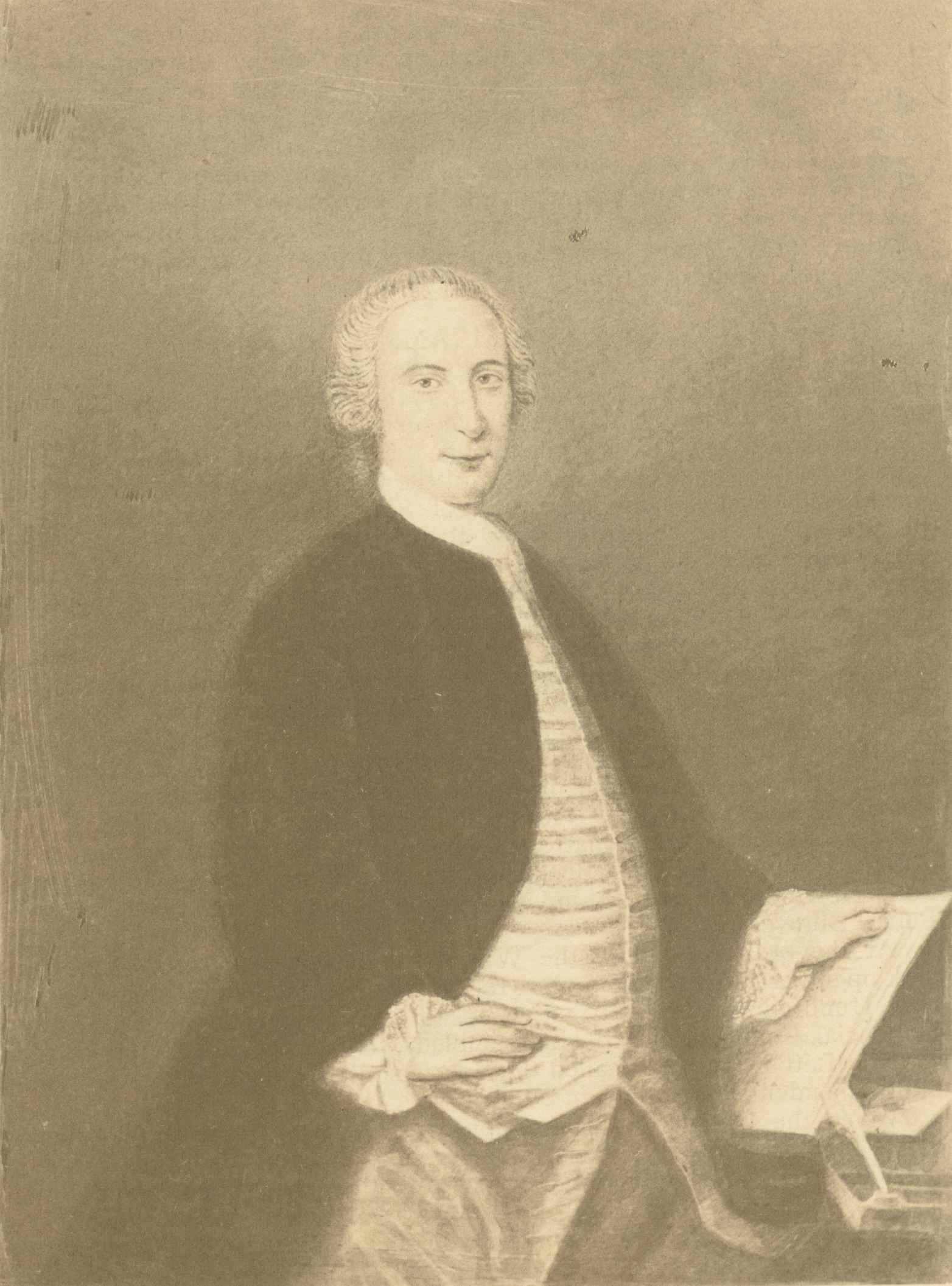
James Beekman, New York Public Library's Digital Library

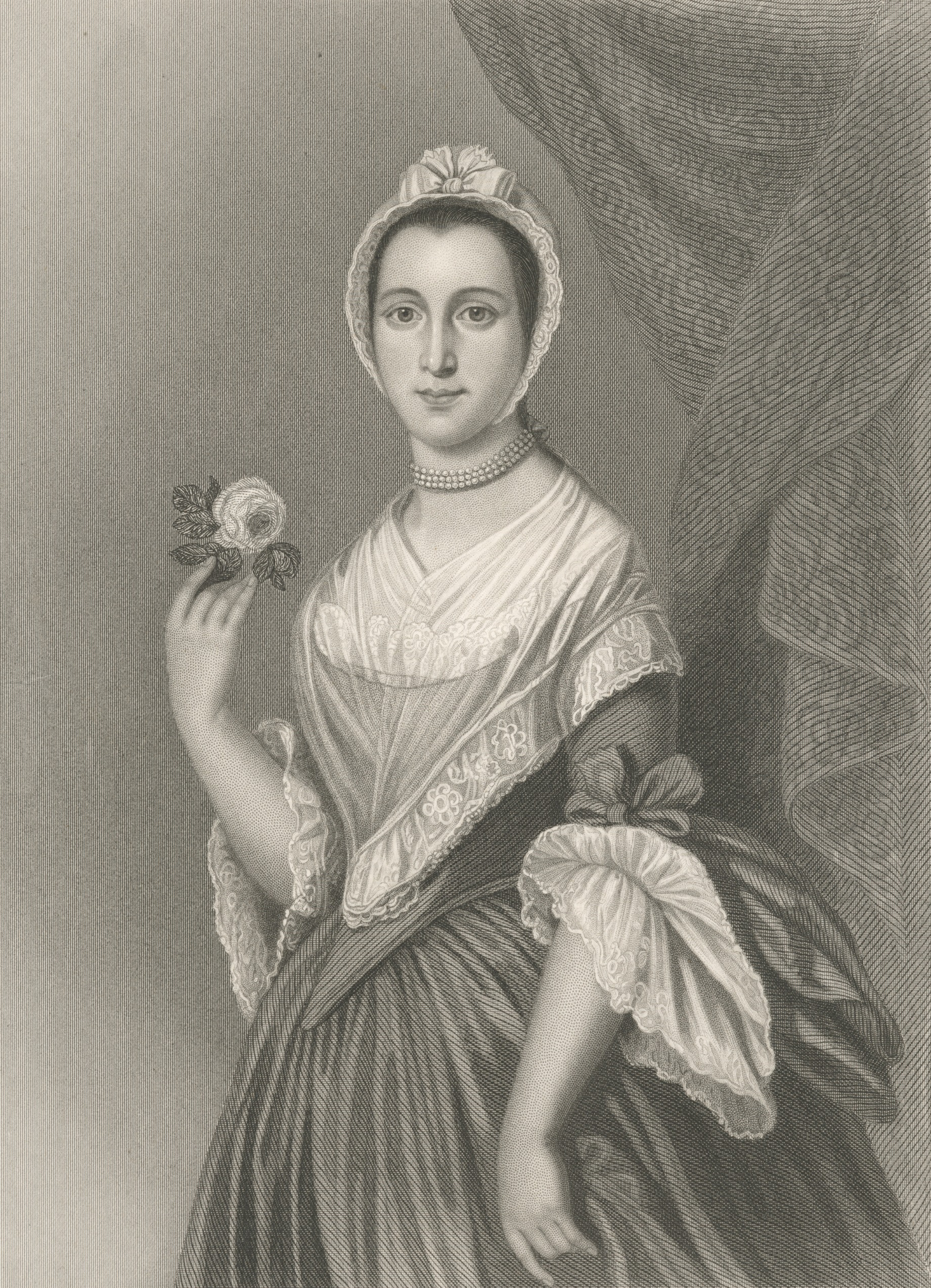
James' wife, Jane Ketaltas Beekman

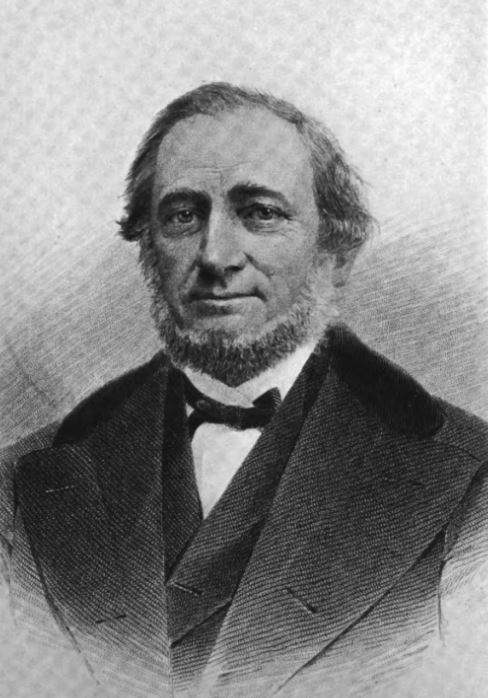
James William Beekman

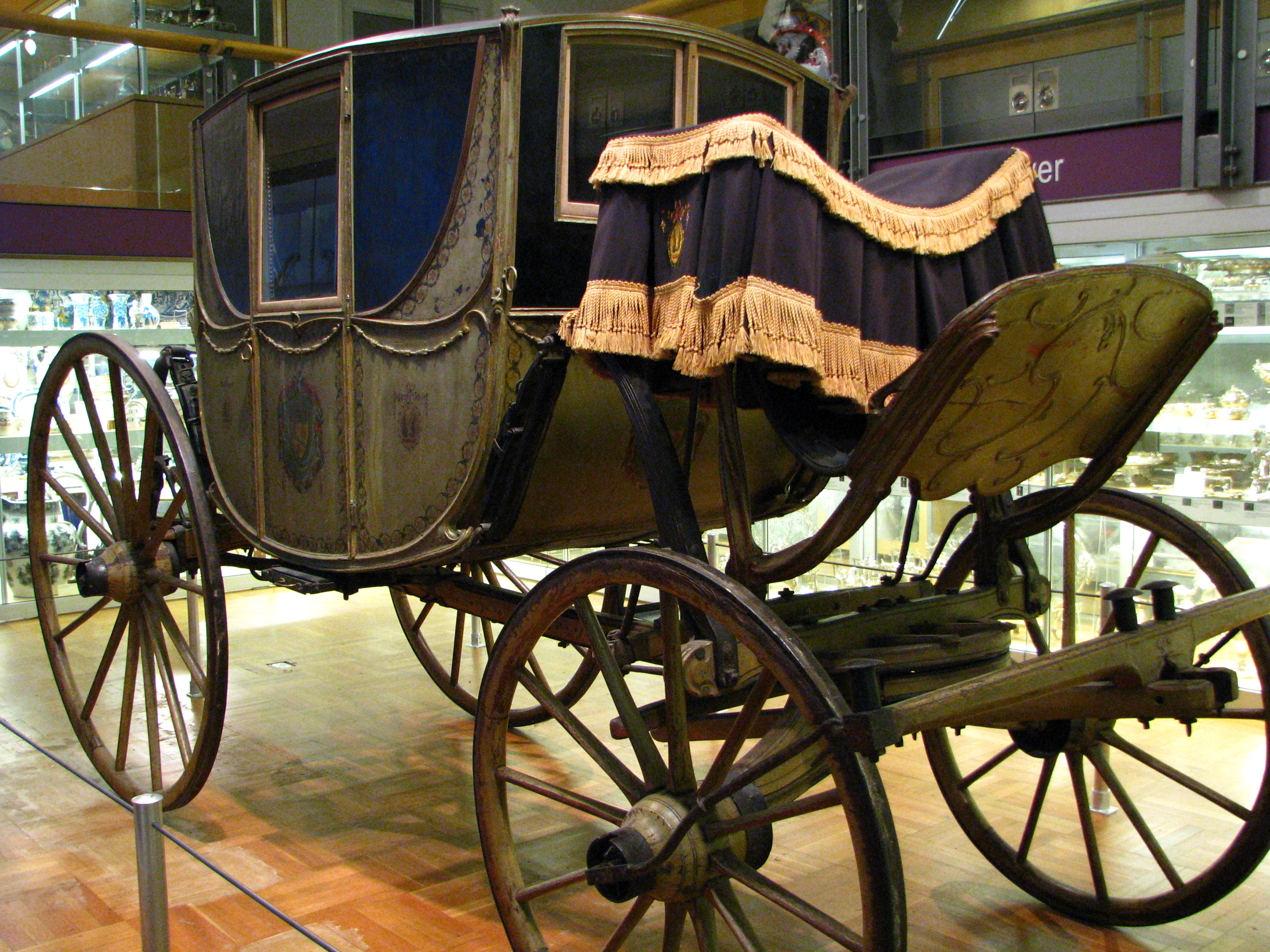
Beekman family coach (New-York Historical Society, c. 1770)

== See also ==
- Beekman, New York, a town in Dutchess County named after Hendrick Beekman (1652–1716), son of Willem Beekman
  - Beekman Fire District
  - Beekman Park
- Beekman Corners, New York, community now part of Sharon, New York
- Beekmantown, New York, a town in Clinton County, New York
- Beekman Place (Manhattan), street that was the site of the Beekman family mansion, Mount Pleasant
- Beekman, Manhattan, the neighborhood around Beekman Place
- The Beekman, previously known as Beekman Tower, a skyscraper designed by Frank Gehry, New York City
- Beekman (Panhellenic) Tower, skyscraper designed by John Mead Howels (constructed 1927–29), New York City
- Beekman Downtown Hospital or Lower Manhattan Hospital, New York City
- Beekman Peninsula of Baffin Island, named after James W. Beekman, of New York
- Beekman Native Plant Arboretum, in Oregon, named after Cornelius C. Beekman
