= James William Beekman =

American politician

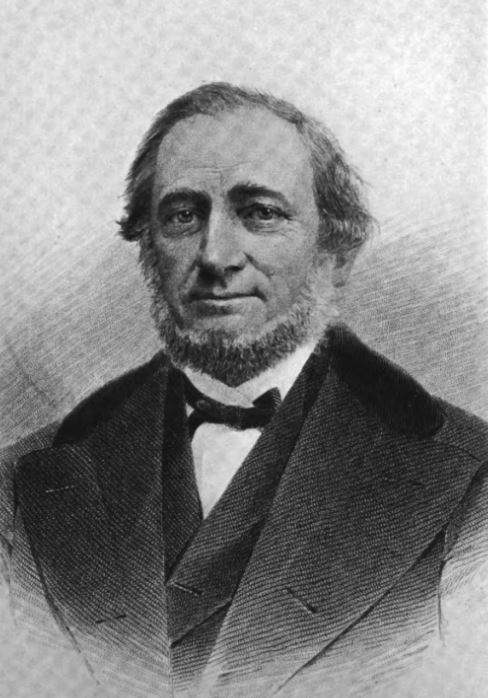

Member of the New York State Senate
- In office January 1, 1850 – December 31, 1853
- Preceded by: Samuel Frost
- Succeeded by: Mark Spencer

Member of the New York State Assembly
- In office January 1, 1849 – December 31, 1849
- Preceded by: Samuel G. Raymond
- Succeeded by: Jonathan W. Allen

Personal details
- Born: November 22, 1815 New York City, US
- Died: June 15, 1877 (aged 61) New York City, US
- Party: Whig
- Spouse: Abian Steele Milledoler
- Relations: James Beekman (grandfather)
- Children: 5
- Parent(s): Gerard Beekman; Catharine Saunders
- Education: Columbia College
- Awards: Order of Orange-Nassau

James William Beekman (22 November 1815 – 15 June 1877) was an arts patron and politician from New York who served as the vice president of the New York Hospital. He was a member of the prominent Beekman family.

== Early life ==
James William Beekman was born in New York City on November 22, 1815. He was the son of Gerard Beekman (1774–1833) and Catharine Saunders (1785–1835). His paternal grandparents were James Beekman (1732–1807) and Jane Keteltas (1734–1817). His 2x great-grandfather was Gerardus Beekman, and his 3x great-grandfather was Dutch Wilhelmus Beekman, who sailed with Peter Stuyvesant to New Netherlands, and was an officer of the Dutch West India Company.

He graduated from Columbia College in 1834, and studied law with John Landis Mason, but never joined the New York Bar Association. His father died in 1833 left him with money, and the death of his uncle, James Beekman, Jr. (1758-1837), added to his real estate holdings on the East River near Fifty-second street, including the Beekman mansion, "Mount Pleasant", a place of historic interest from its prominence in Revolutionary times.

== Career ==
He was a member of the New York State Assembly (New York Co., 6th D.) in 1849; and of the New York State Senate (5th D.) from 1850 to 1853, sitting in the 73rd, 74th, 75th and 76th New York State Legislatures.

In 1861, along with Erastus Corning and Thurlow Weed, Beekman was appointed by a meeting of conservative men in New York to go to Washington and urge President James Buchanan to relieve Fort Sumter.

He was vice-president of the New York Hospital, president of the woman's hospital, and a director of the New York dispensary.

He was also one of the early members of the New-York Historical Society, before which he delivered a centennial discourse in 1871 and read papers at different times. On 4 December 1869, he delivered an address before the St. Nicholas Society on "The Founders of New York," which was afterward published.

In February 1876, he published a report on a village of hospitals.

== Personal life ==
He married Abian Ann Steele Milledoler (1819–1897), daughter of Phillip Milledoler (1775–1852), the president of Rutgers University, and Margaret Steele (d. 1852). Their children included:

- Catherine Beekman (1841–1923), who married William W. Hoppin, Jr. (1840–1913), son of Governor William W. Hoppin.
- Gerard Beekman (1842–1918)
- Philip Milledoller Beekman (1845–1846)
- James William Beekman, Jr. (1847–1908)
- Cornelia Augusta Beekman (1849–1917)

He died in 1877 and was buried in Green-Wood Cemetery. At the time of his death, he had two sons and two daughters living. The pallbearers at his funeral were Frederic de Peyster, Benjamin H. Field, F. G. Foster, J. H. Hammersley, Dr. Thomas Addis Emmet, John Jay, and Hamilton Fish. His estate was valued at several million dollars.

=== Legacy ===
The James William Beekman House is a registered landmark in Oyster Bay, New York, designed by Henry G. Harrison, and was listed on the National Register of Historic Places. In his will, he left his Oyster Bay home, known then as "The Cliffs," to his son Gerard, and his home on Madison Avenue to his son, James Jr.

New York State Assembly
Preceded by Samuel G. Raymond	New York State Assembly; New York County, 6th District; 1849	Succeeded by Jonathan W. Allen
New York State Senate
Preceded by Samuel Frost	New York State Senate; 6th District; 1850–1853	Succeeded by Mark Spencer
