= Allen Island =

Allen Island may refer to:

- Allen Island (Nunavut), an uninhabited island in the Qikiqtaaluk Region of Nunavut, Canada
- Allen Island (Maine), a private island which is part of St. George, Knox County, Maine
- Allen Island, Queensland, an island in the South Wellesley Islands, Gulf of Carpentaria, Queensland
