= Henry Rutgers Beekman (judge) =

American judge

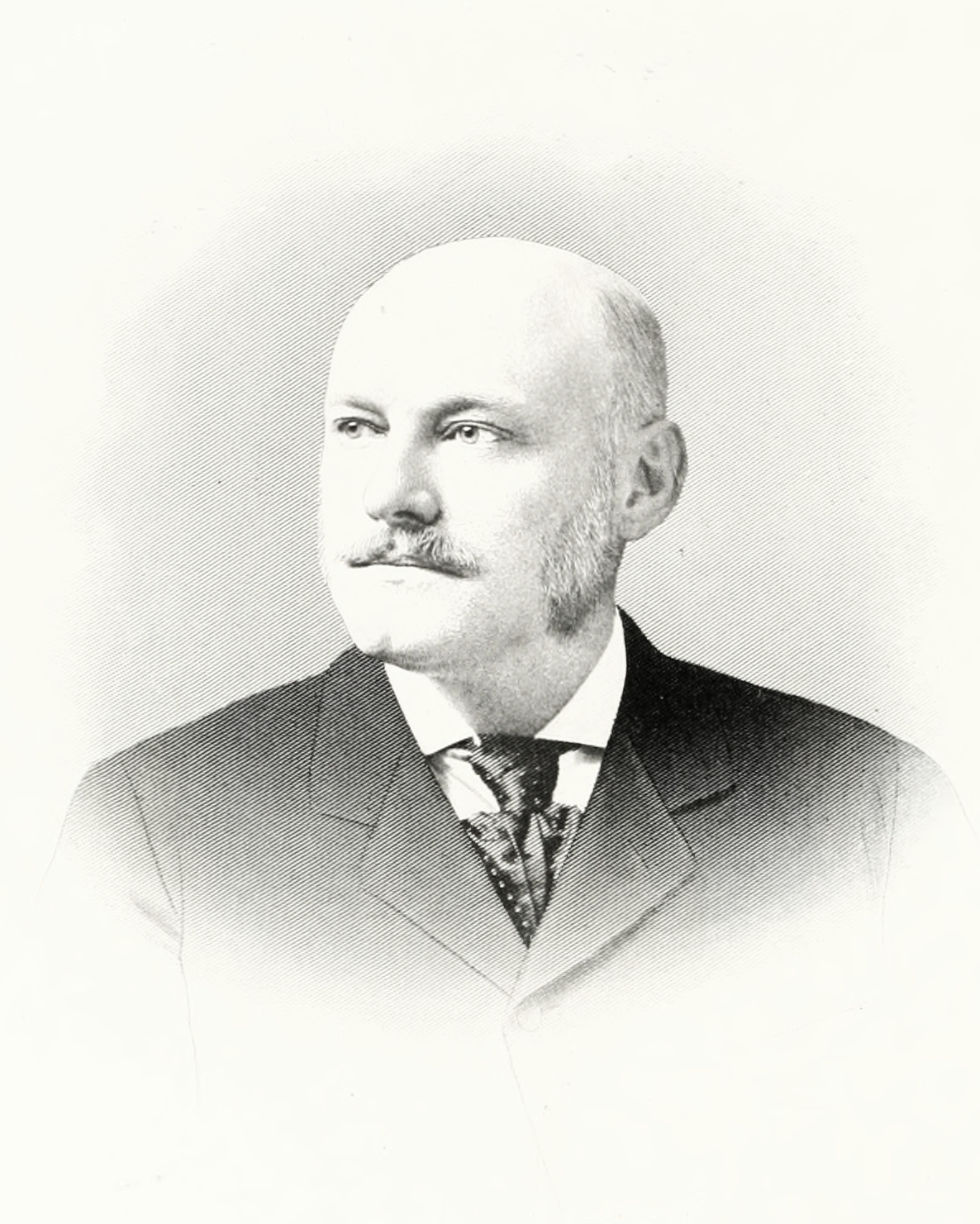
- Portrait of Beekman
- Born: December 8, 1845; New York City, New York, U.S.
- Died: December 17, 1900 (aged 55); New York City, New York, U.S.
- Education: Columbia College; Columbia Law School
- Occupations: Judge, lawyer
- Children: Henry Rutgers Beekman
- Family: Beekman family

Henry Rutgers Beekman (December 8, 1845 – December 17, 1900) was an American lawyer, judge, and government official. A member of the Beekman family, he served as a justice of the Supreme Court of New York and was New York City Parks Commissioner.

== Biography ==
Beekman was born in New York City to William Fenwick Beekman and Catherine Alexander (Neilson) Beekman on December 8, 1845. His great-grandfather was prominent New York merchant James Beekman, and his great-great-grandfather was New York governor Gerardus Beekman, son of Wilhelmus Beekman, Treasurer of the Dutch West India Company, who also served as Mayor of New York City and Governor of Delaware and Pennsylvania.

He graduated from Columbia College in 1865 before earning his LL.B. from Columbia Law School in 1867. He was admitted to the bar in 1867 and started a practice with fellow lawyer David B. Ogden.

In 1894, Beekman was appointed judge of the Supreme Court of New York. From 1885 to 1887 he was the New York City Parks Commissioner, appointed by Mayor William Russell Grace. From 1887 to 1888, he was a member and president of the New York City Board of Aldermen. He also served as the Corporation Counsel of New York City from 1888 to 1889. He became a justice of the New York Supreme Court in 1896.

Beekman died on December 17, 1900. He was a member of the University Club of New York, Union Club of the City of New York, Century Association, and the Manhattan Club. His son, Henry Rutgers Beekman, was a watercolorist.
