= Rogers Island =

Rogers Island may refer to:

- Rogers Island (Connecticut)
- Rogers Island (New York)
- Rogers Island (Nunavut)
