= James Beekman =

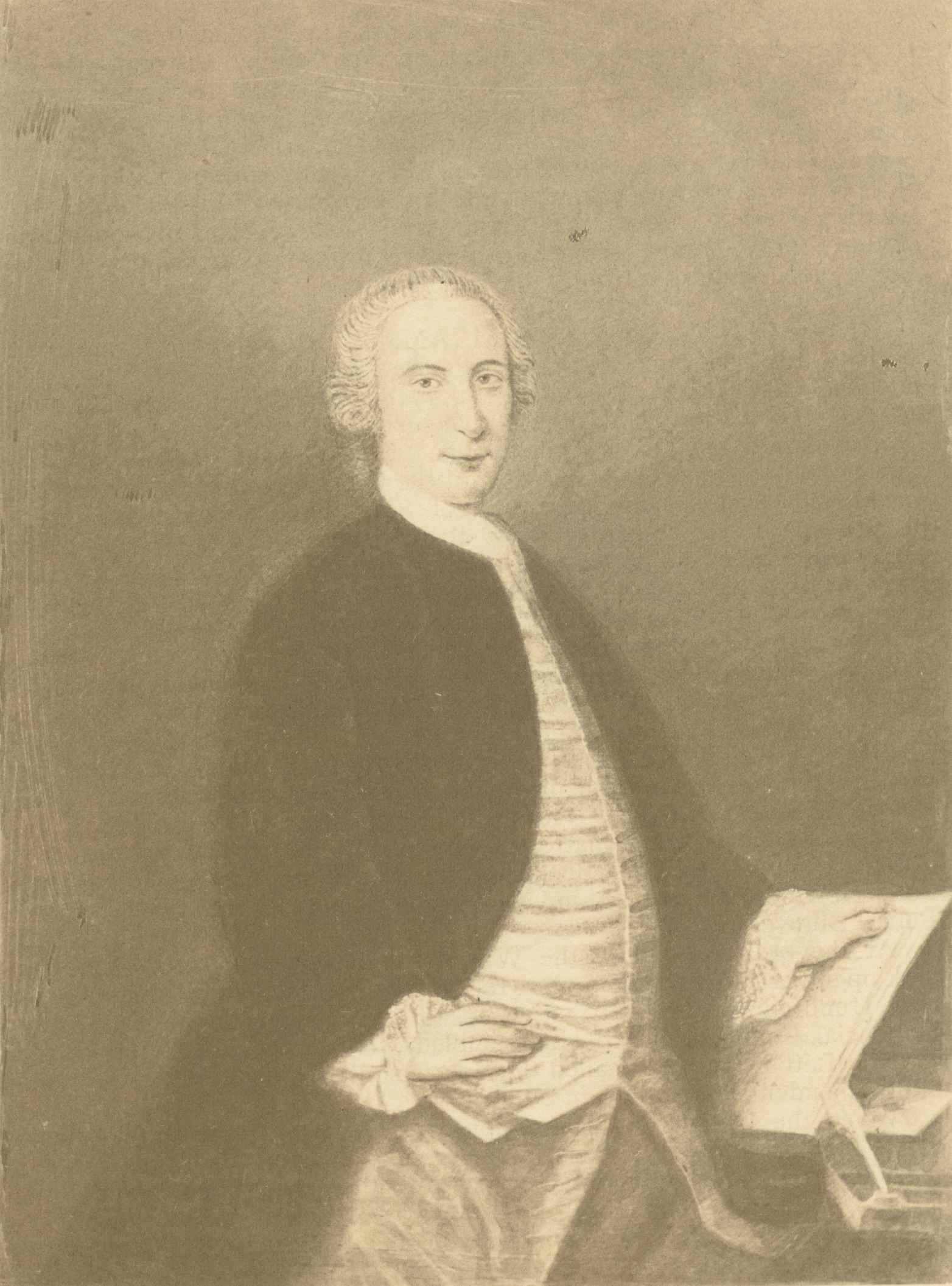
- Born: 1732; New York City, Province of New York
- Died: 1807 (aged 75); New York City, New York
- Spouse: Jane Keteltas (m. 1752)
- Children: 10
- Parent(s): William Beekman; Catharine De Lanoy
- Relatives: Gerardus Beekman (grandfather); Wilhelmus Beekman (great-grandfather); James William Beekman (grandson)

James Beekman (1732–1807) was a New York City merchant and a member of the prominent Beekman family.

== Early life ==
Coat of Arms of James Beekman

James Beekman was born in 1732, the son of William Beekman (1684–1770) and Catharine De Lanoy (1691–1765), niece of Peter Delanoy, the first elected Mayor of New York City after British rule. His paternal grandparents were Gerardus Beekman (1653–1723), the acting Governor of the province of New York in 1710, and Magdalena Abeel (1661–1731), sister of Johannes Abeel (1667–1711), the second mayor of Albany. His great-grandfather was Wilhelmus Beekman (1623–1707), a Dutch immigrant who came to New Amsterdam from the Netherlands on the same vessel as Peter Stuyvesant. Wilhelmus soon became Treasurer of the Dutch West India Company and later became the Mayor of New York City, Governor of Delaware from 1653 to 1664, and Governor of Pennsylvania from 1658 to 1663.

== Mount Pleasant ==
He is best remembered for his mansion, known as Mount Pleasant, which he built in Manhattan on the East River in 1763, near the northwest corner of 1st Avenue and East 51st Street. This mansion served as the British military headquarters during the American Revolution, and was the site of the trial of Nathan Hale.

== Personal life ==
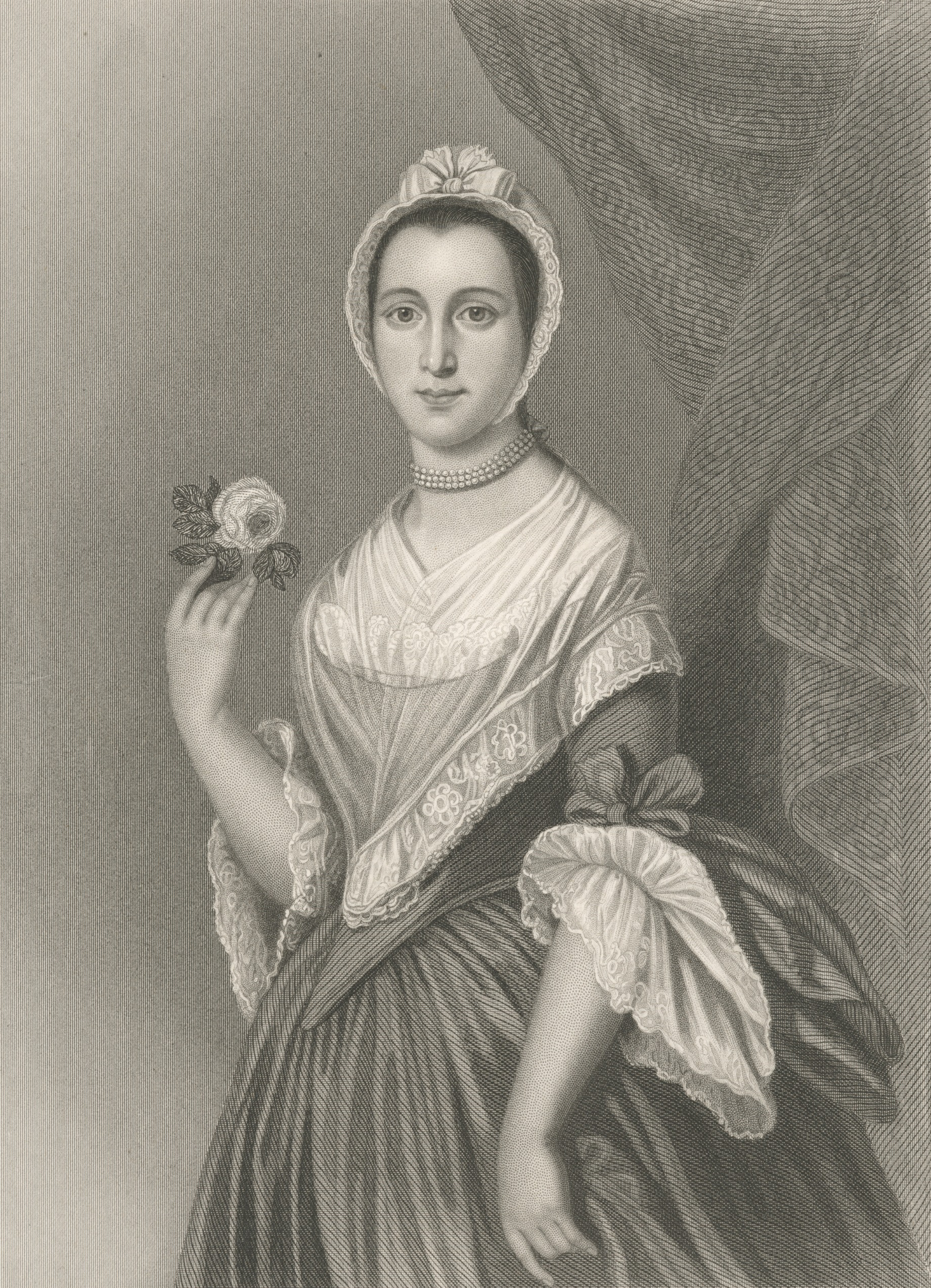
James' wife, Jane Ketaltas

In 1752, he was married to Janneke "Jane" Keteltas (1734–1817), daughter of Abraham Keteltas and Jeanne d'Honneur, and sister of Abraham Keteltas (1732–1798). Together, they had:

- William Beekman (b. 1754)
- Abraham Keteltas Beekman (1756–1816), who married his cousin, Johanna Beekman
- James Beekman Jr. (1758–1837), who married Lydia Watkins Drew
- Jane Beekman (b. 1760), who married Stephen Van Cortlandt
- Catharine "Caty" Beekman (b. 1762), who married Elisha Boudinot, brother of Elias Boudinot, in 1805.
- Mary Beekman (b. 1765), who married Stephen N. Bayard.
- John Beekman (1768–1843), who married Mary Elizabeth Goad Bedlow (1771–1848)
- Cornelia Beekman (b. 1770)
- Elisabet Beekman (b. 1773)
- Gerard Beekman (1774–1833), who married Catharine Saunders (1785–1835)

=== Legacy ===
Beekman is known to have commissioned portraits of his children from the painter John Durand, and the entry for payment in his account book, dating to 1766, is the first record of the artist in New York. On his death in 1807, Beekman left inherited the family's country estate and portraits to his son, James Beekman Jr. Upon his son's death in 1837, the estate was passed to James Beekman Jr.'s nephew, James William Beekman, the son of Gerard Beekman.

=== Exhibition ===
In 2004, the New-York Historical Society presented an exhibition based around a coach owned by Beekman, one of only three such coaches to survive in its original condition. Beekman had bought the coach in 1771 from Peter Burton, a London sea captain, for £138.
