= Allen Island (Nunavut) =

Island in Nunavut, Canada

- Location within Nunavut Location within Canada

Geography
- Location: Cornelius Grinnell Bay
- Coordinates: 63°28′N 064°54′W
- Archipelago: Arctic Archipelago

Administration
- Canada
- Territory: Nunavut
- Region: Qikiqtaaluk

Demographics
- Population: Uninhabited

Allen Island is an uninhabited island in the Qikiqtaaluk Region of Nunavut, Canada. It is a Baffin Island offshore island located in Cornelius Grinnell Bay. It is east of Hall Peninsula and is separated from Beekman Peninsula on the west by Smith Channel. The significantly smaller Rogers Island is approximately 13 km (8.1 mi) to the south.
