= Henry Rutgers Beekman (artist) =

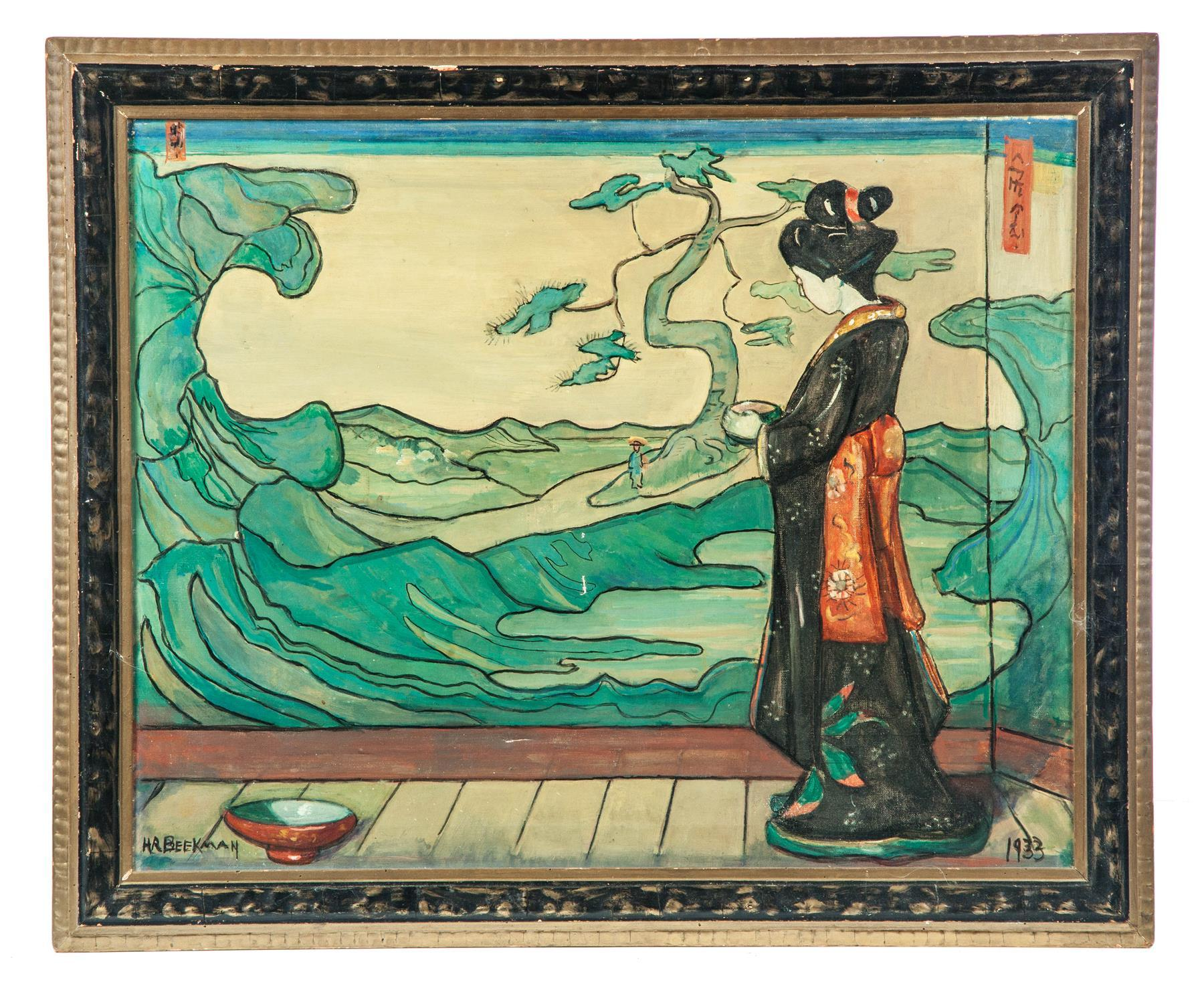
ASIAN INTERIOR BY HENRY BEEKMAN

Henry Rutgers Beekman (1880–1938) was an American watercolorist. He specialized in paintings for children and served on the faculty of the Master Institute of United Arts. He was a member of the Beekman family.

== Biography ==
Beekman was born in New York City in 1880 to New York Supreme Court justice Henry Rutgers Beekman and Isabella Lawrence Beekman. He was descended from Wilhelmus Beekman, Treasurer of the Dutch West India Company, who also served as Mayor of New York City and Governor of Delaware and Pennsylvania.

Beekman graduated from Columbia College in 1903 and from Columbia Law School in 1906. After two years of law practice and some time as a real estate broker, he decided to take up the study of art and become a painter and etcher.

Beekman studied at the New York School of Fine and Applied Art and at the Art Students League of New York. He was a faculty of the Master Institute of United Arts and was a member of the Connecticut Academy of Art. Beekman was a fellow of the New York Watercolor Club and Washington Watercolor Club. He specialized in paintings for children.

Beekman died on August 23, 1938, of heart attack at the age of 57.
