= Gilbert Livingston Beeckman =

Gilbert Livingston Beeckman (October 7, 1823 – December 23, 1874) was an American merchant who was the father of Rhode Island Governor Robert Livingston Beeckman.

== Early life ==
Beeckman was born on October 7, 1823, in New York City, New York. He was the son of Henry Beekman (1774–1857) and Catherine McPhaedris (née Livingston) Beeckman (1789–1863). His elder brother was John Henry Beeckman (who married Margaret Gardiner, daughter of David Gardiner, in 1848 at the Virginia plantation of her brother-in-law, former President John Tyler) and his elder sister was Helen Smith Beekman (the wife of John Andrew Graham).

His family ancestry can be traced back to Dutch settlers of New Amsterdam and his ancestors include Robert Livingston the Elder, Declaration signer Philip Livingston and "The Chancellor" Robert Livingston. His paternal grandparents were Johannes Beekman and Hendrickje (née van Buren) Beekman. His maternal grandparents were Gilbert Robert Livingston (a grandson of Gilbert Livingston) and Martha De Lancey (née Kane) Livingston.

== Career ==
Beeckman became a merchant like his father before him. In 1855, he was listed as a wholesale dealer in foreign merchandise at 48 Broadway and was worth an estimated $150,000 and was a partner in Bowers, Beeckman, & Bradford, Jr. (which was Beeckman with Samuel D. Bradford of West Roxbury, Massachusetts, Henry Bowers Jr. of Yonkers, New York, Henry Beeckman Graham of New York and Samuel D. Bradford Jr. of Astoria), located at 82 Vesey Street.

Beeckman's elder brother John and their cousin Henry Beeckman Livingston both set up a mercantile operating during the California Gold Rush. His brother accidentally shot himself to death during a hunting trip there in 1850.

Beeckman's business was severely affected by the Panic of 1873 before suffering a heart attack two days before Christmas 1874 which led to his death.

== Personal life ==
In 1851, Beeckman was married to Margaret Atherton Foster (1832–1904), a daughter of Samuel H. Foster and Eliza Robinson Atherton. Together, they lived at 58 West 11th Street in Manhattan (with sojourns in Dutchess County, New York, and Newport, Rhode Island) and were the parents of five children, four girls and one boy:

- Katherine Livingston Beeckman (1855–1941), who married Louis Lasher Lorillard, a son of Pierre Lorillard III.
- Helen Beeckman (1858–1934), who married William Pratt Lyman (d. 1924).
- Margaret Atherton Beeckman (1861–1951), who married Campbell Steward (1852–1936).
- Martha Beeckman (1863–1951), who married New York banker Amos Tuck French.
- Robert Livingston Beeckman (1866–1935), who married Eleanor Thomas (1878–1920), a daughter of Gen. Samuel Russell Thomas, in 1902. After her death, he married Edna (née Marston) Burke in 1923.

Beeckman died on December 23, 1874, at age 51, at New Brighton, Staten Island. After his death, his family moved to Newport, Rhode Island, where they bought Land's End (which the writer Edith Wharton bought in 1893 for $80,000). His widow died in April 1904 at 2 West 36th Street, her New York residence.
