= Abraham Keteltas =

American minister

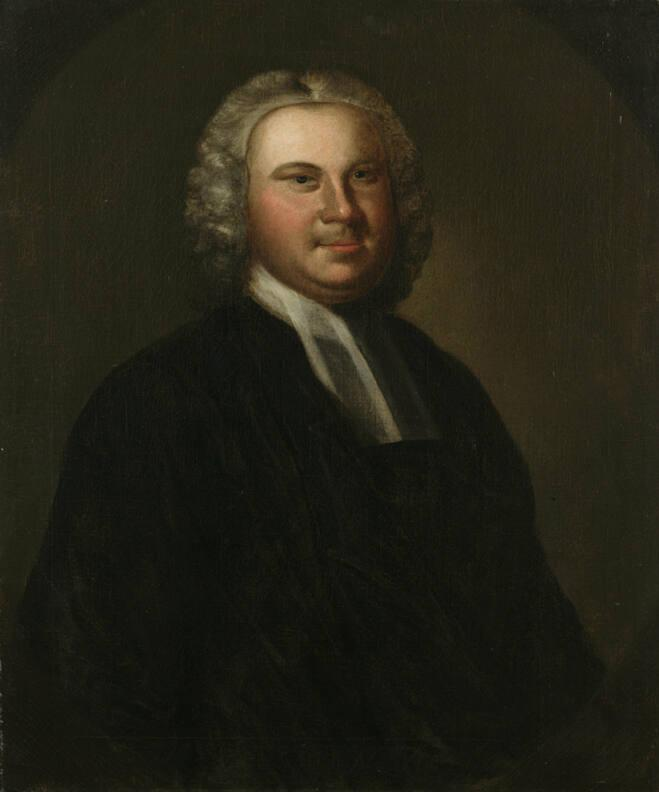
- Born: December 26, 1732
- Died: September 30, 1798

Abraham Keteltas (1732–1798) was raised by Protestant parents in New York City and New Rochelle, where his father, Abraham Keteltas Sr, had moved form Holland in 1720. He spent much of his time among the communities of Huguenots in the area. Becoming fluent in French early on, he later studied theology at Yale, where he earned his degree in 1752, followed by his preacher's license in 1756. From 1757 until his dismissal in 1760, Keteltas supplied the pulpit of the Presbyterian church in Elizabethtown, New Jersey. He then served as an itinerant preacher to the Dutch and Huguenot parishes in Jamaica and Long Island, New York, where he gained much popular support. Keteltas was a delegate to the New York Congress in 1776 while Pastor John Rodgers who was a chaplain of that body in 1777. By 1776, Keteltas was elected to the Provincial Congress and became such a vociferous defender of the American cause that he feared for reprisals when British troops landed on Long Island. During the American Revolution, he served as preacher to a number of Presbyterian churches in Massachusetts and Connecticut until his retirement in 1782. Following the war, he was appointed to a special commission that oversaw the redistribution of livestock on Long Island. He died in 1798 and was buried in Prospect Cemetery, Queens, New York, not far from where he lived.

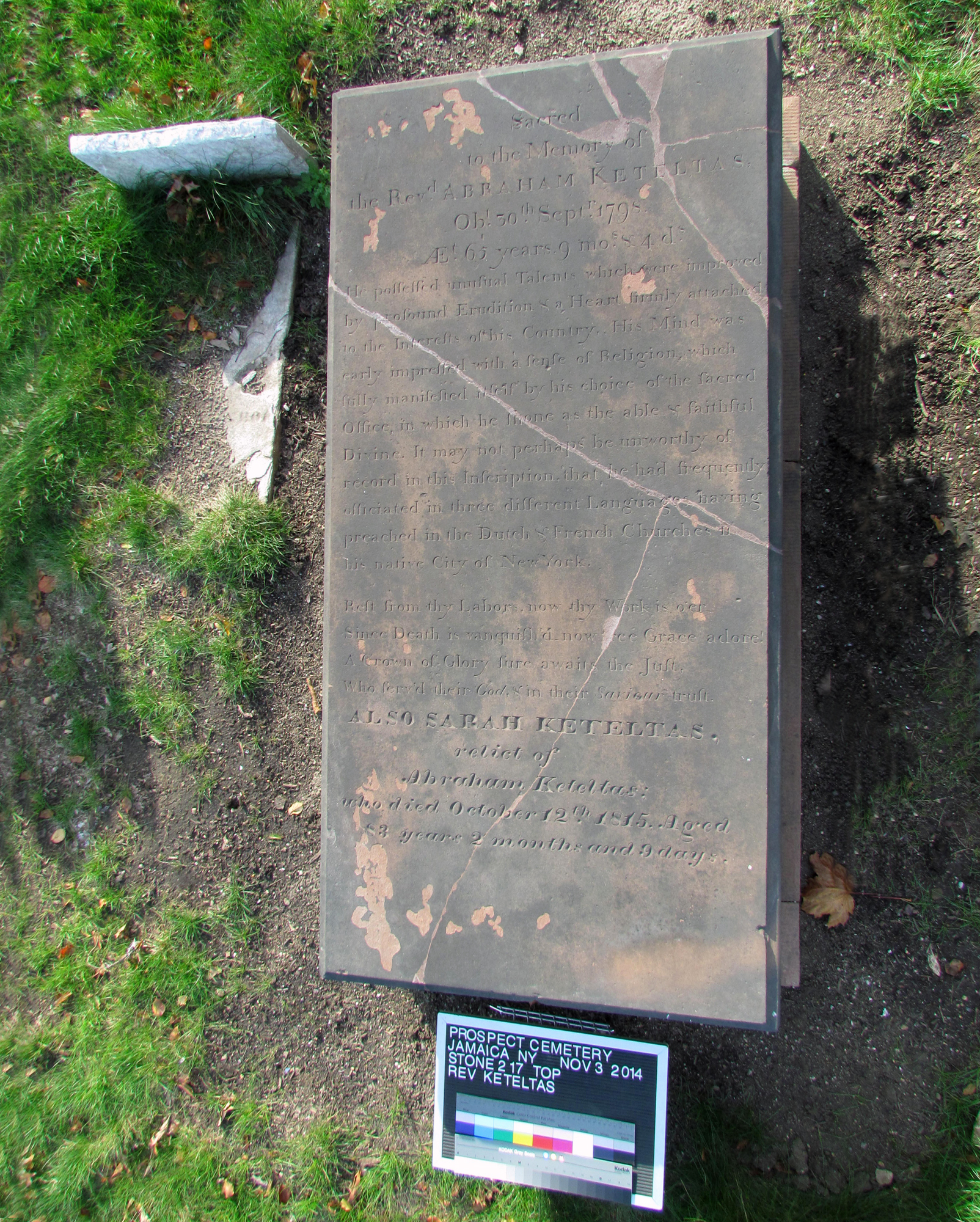
Rev. Keteltas restored grave site at Prospect Cemetery

Of his patriotic sermons, three deserve to be singled out. The Religious Soldier (1759), preached to American and British forces in 1759, exhorts his audience to moral conduct in warfare and patriotic service of their country. God Arising And Pleading his People's Cause (1777) and his Reflections on Extortion (1778) are bold expressions of American Independence.

== See also ==
- George Whitefield — itinerant preacher in the pre-revolution years
- Old Pine Street Church — Presbyterian Church in Philadelphia, meeting place for colonial revolutionaries.
- George Duffield — Chaplain for General George Washington, often referred to as "The revolutionary patriot"

== Sources ==
- Duffy, John-Charles (2021). "Abraham Keteltas (1777)" (PDF).
- "Reverend Abraham Keteltas (1732-1798)". New-York Historical Society.
- Kramer, Leonard J. (December 1953). "Muskets in the Pulpit". Journal of the Presbyterian Historical Society (1943-1961). 31 (4). JSTOR 23325203.
