= Rogers Island (Nunavut) =

Island in Nunavut, Canada

- Location within Nunavut Location within Canada

Geography
- Location: Labrador Sea
- Coordinates: 63°14′N 64°44′W
- Archipelago: Arctic Archipelago

Administration
- Canada
- Territory: Nunavut
- Region: Qikiqtaaluk

Demographics
- Population: Uninhabited

Rogers Island (variant: Roger Island) is a Baffin Island offshore island located in the Arctic Archipelago in the territory of Nunavut. The island lies in the Labrador Sea at the mouth of Cornelius Grinnell Bay between the Hall Peninsula and Beekman Peninsula. The significantly larger Allen Island is approximately 13 km (8.1 mi) to the north.
