= Willem Baudartius =

Flemish theologian (1565–1640)

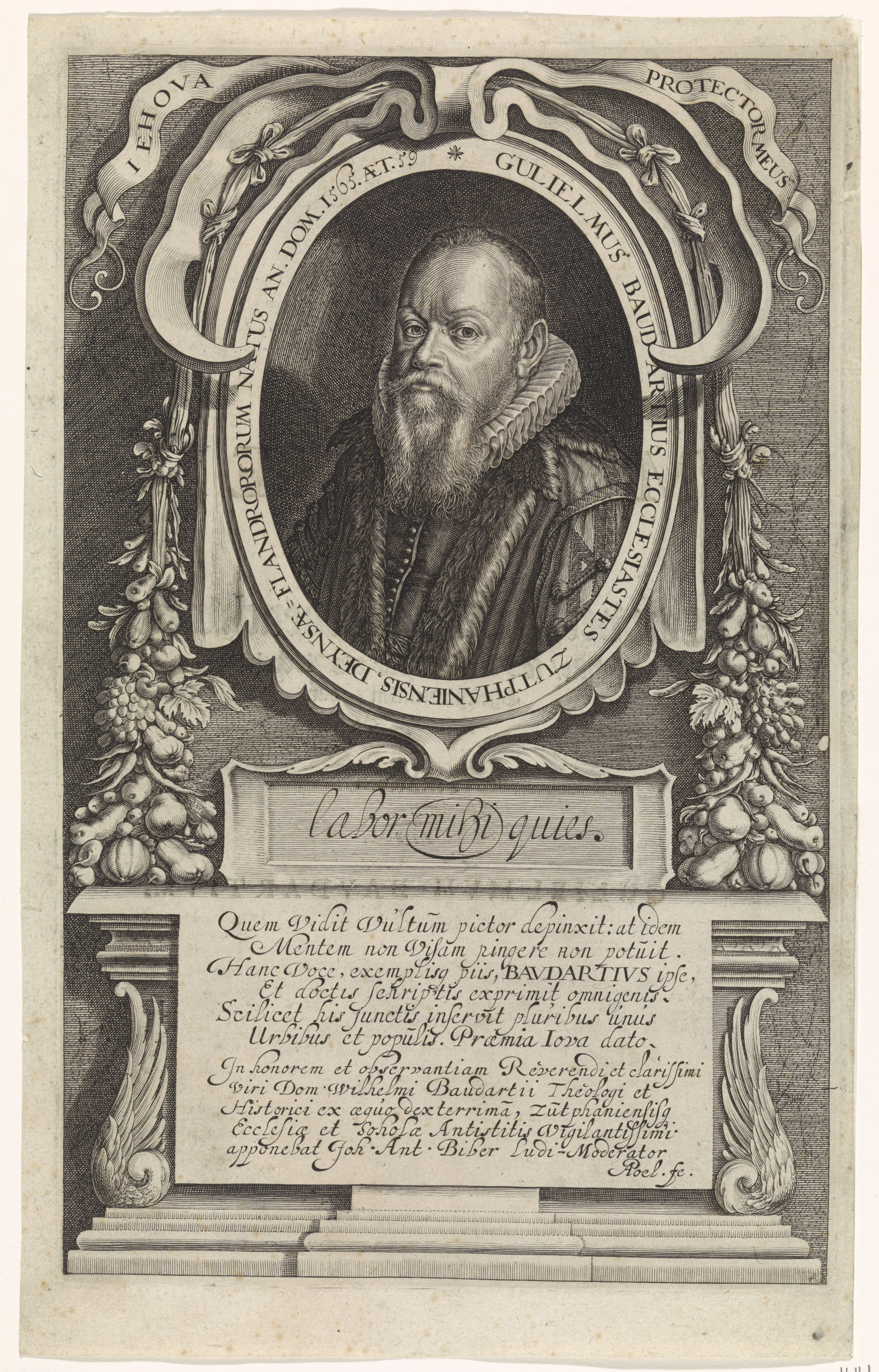

Willem Baudaert, Willem Baudartius or Wilhelmus Baudartius (13 February 1565 in Deinze, County of Flanders, to 15 December 1640 Zutphen), born Willem Baudart, was a Flemish-born theologian. Baudartius College, a Christian secondary school in Zutphen, is named after him.

He was the maternal grandfather of Dutch New Netherland colonist and mayor of New York City Wilhelmus Beekman.

== Life ==
Born to Protestant parents in Deinze, Flanders and a fervent counter-remonstrant, Baudartius left the Spanish Netherlands on the Duke of Alva's arrival, and landed in England at Sandwich. He studied at Canterbury as well as on the continent at Ghent, Leiden, Franeker, and Heidelberg. He served as a preacher at Kampen (1593), Lisse (1596), and Zutphen (until 1640).

Highly knowledgeable in Hebrew, he was asked to take part in the Statenvertaling translation of the Bible.

Baudartius was a student under David Pareus, a professor of theology at Heidelberg University from 1573 until his death. His colleague from 1589 to 1596 was Jacobus Kimmedonck. He had previously studied under Kimmedonck from 1578 till 1584 at Ghent University. Kimmedonck, then minister at Middleburg in Zeeland, introduced him to the Church of Leiden.

In 1585, after the fall of Ghent and Antwerp before the Spanish army under Parma, Baudartius moved to Leiden, in Holland, where his sister Johanna lived.

== Works ==
Baudartius compiled a collection of Christian adages under the title Apophthegmata Christiana, ofte gedenckweerdige, leerzame en aerdige spreucken (1605, 1620), and wrote a pamphlet opposing the Twelve Years' Truce under the title Morghen-Wecker der vrye Nederlantsche provintien (1610).

He also produced a series of illustrations of major events during the first phase of the Eighty Years' War, De Nassausche oorloghen (Amsterdam, 1615).

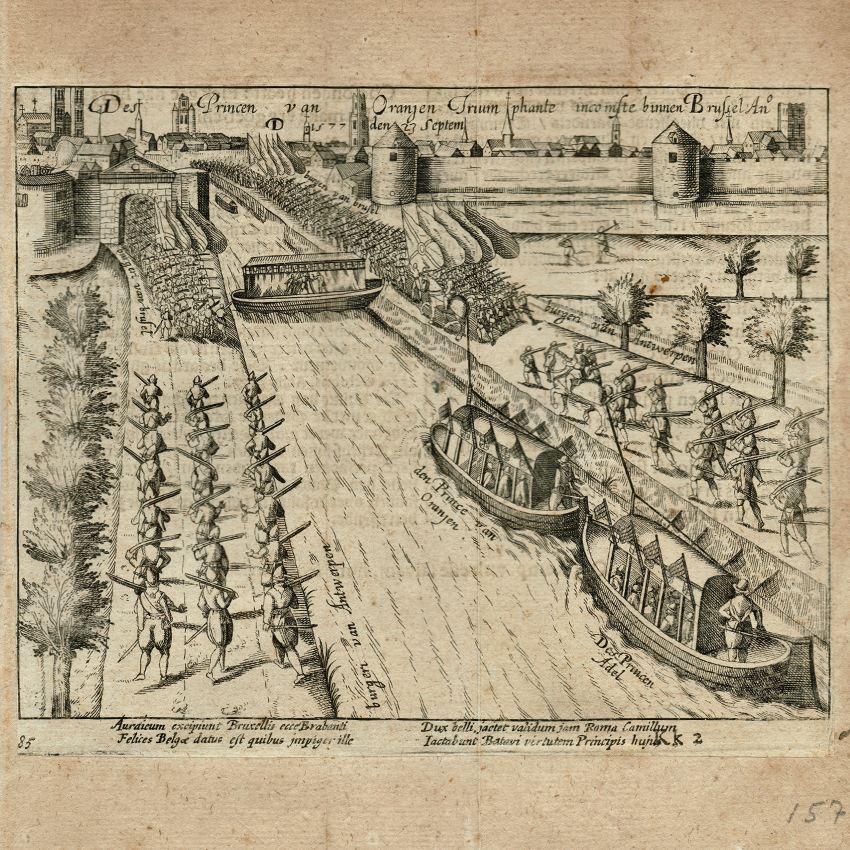
The triumphal entry of the Prince of Orange in Brussels.

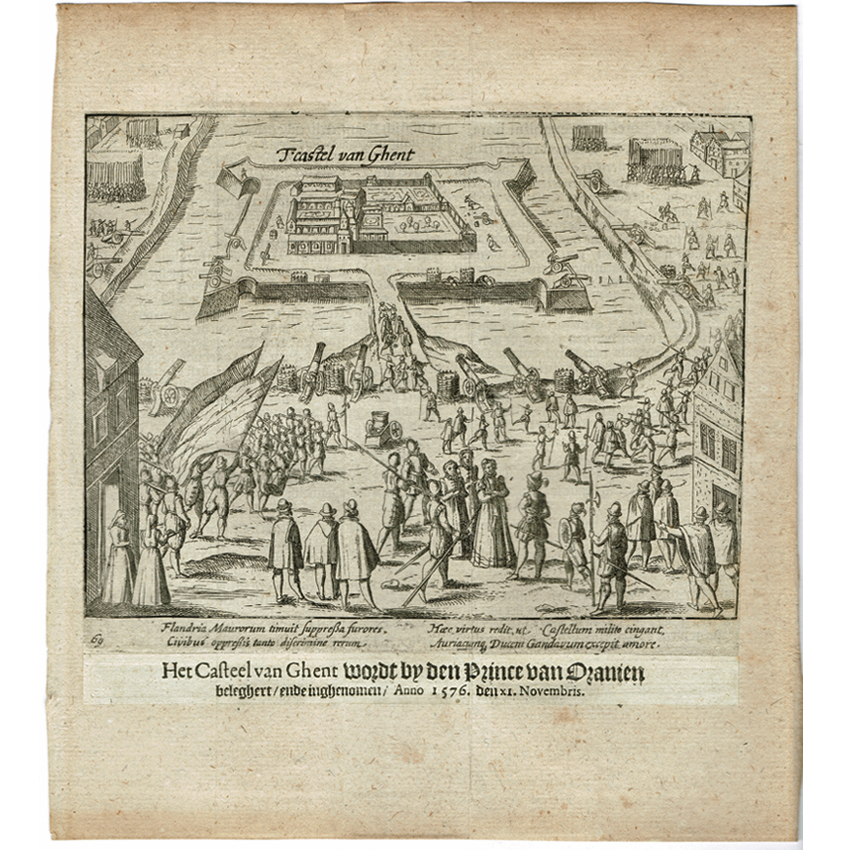
The Prince of Orange seizes the 'Spanish Castle' in Gent on 11 November 1576.

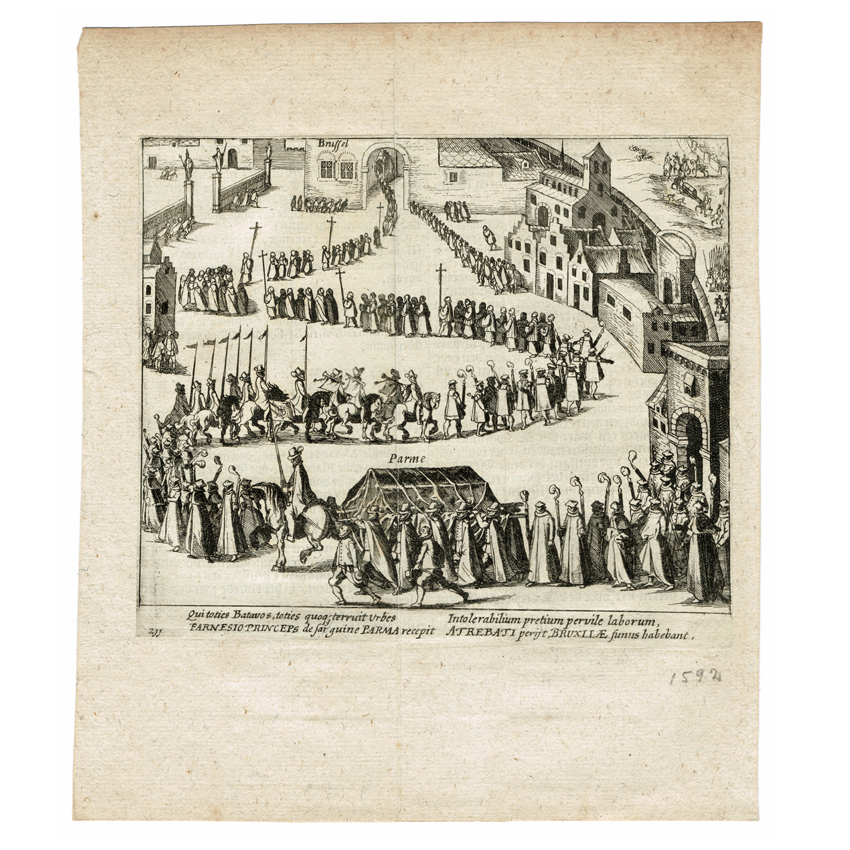
The arrival of the funeral procession of Alexander Farnese, Duke of Parma, Brussels 1592.

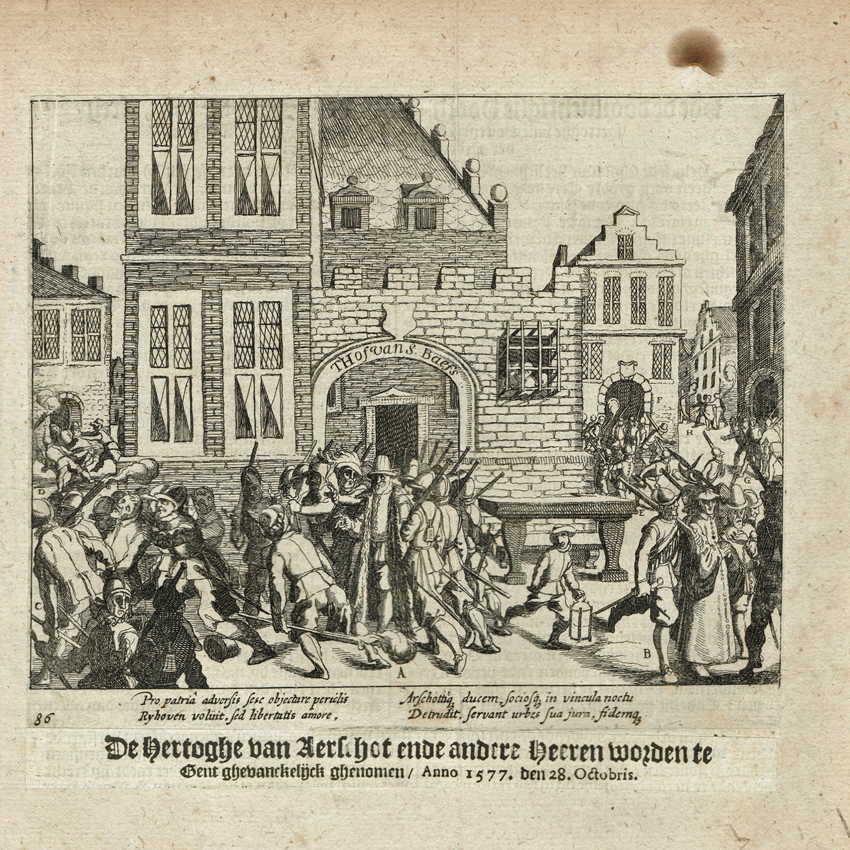
Philipe de Croÿ, Duke of Aarschot and other nobles are taken prisoner in the Court of St. Baeffs in Gent on 28 October 1577.

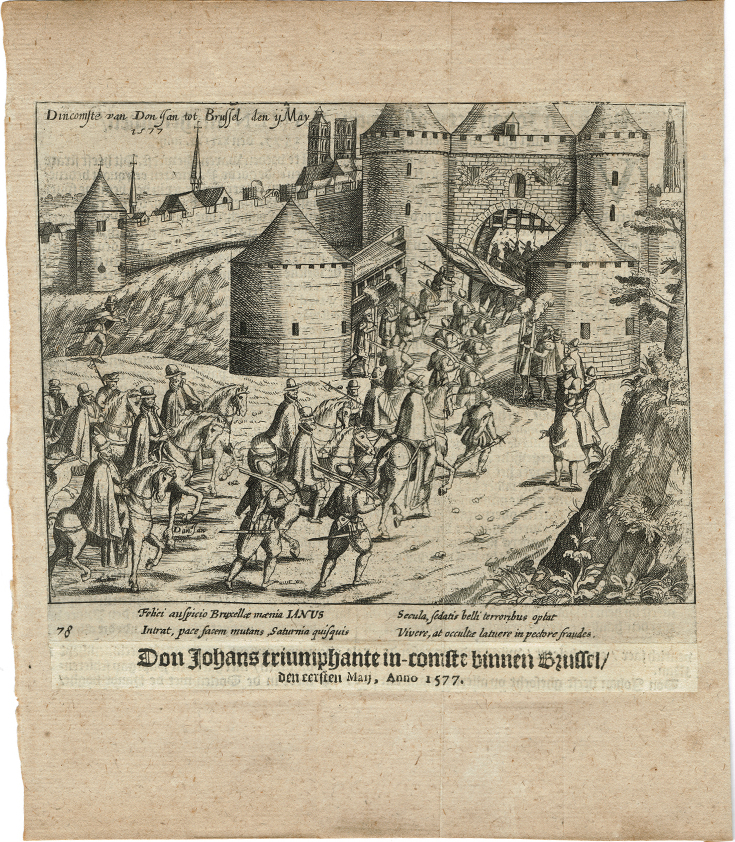
The Joyous Entry of John of Austria in Brussels on 1 May 1577.

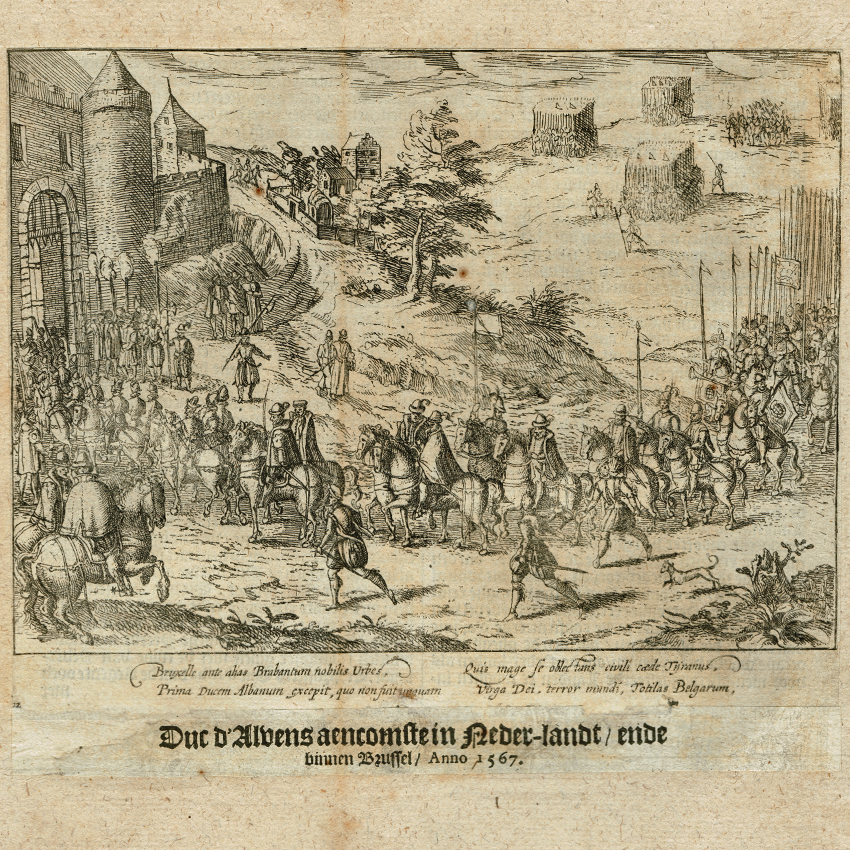
The arrival of the Duke of Alba in Brussels, 1567.
