= James William Beekman House =

Historic house in New York, United States

- U.S. National Register of Historic Places
- Location within New York
- Location: West Shore Rd., Oyster Bay, New York
- Coordinates: 40°52′45″N 73°32′49″W
- Area: 37 acres (15 ha)
- Built: 1863-1864
- Architect: Harrison, Henry G.
- Architectural style: Gothic Revival, "Rural Gothic"
- NRHP reference No.: 73001212
- Added to NRHP: December 12, 1973

The James William Beekman House (also known as "The Cliffs") is a historic house located on West Shore Road in Oyster Bay, Nassau County, New York.

== Description and history ==
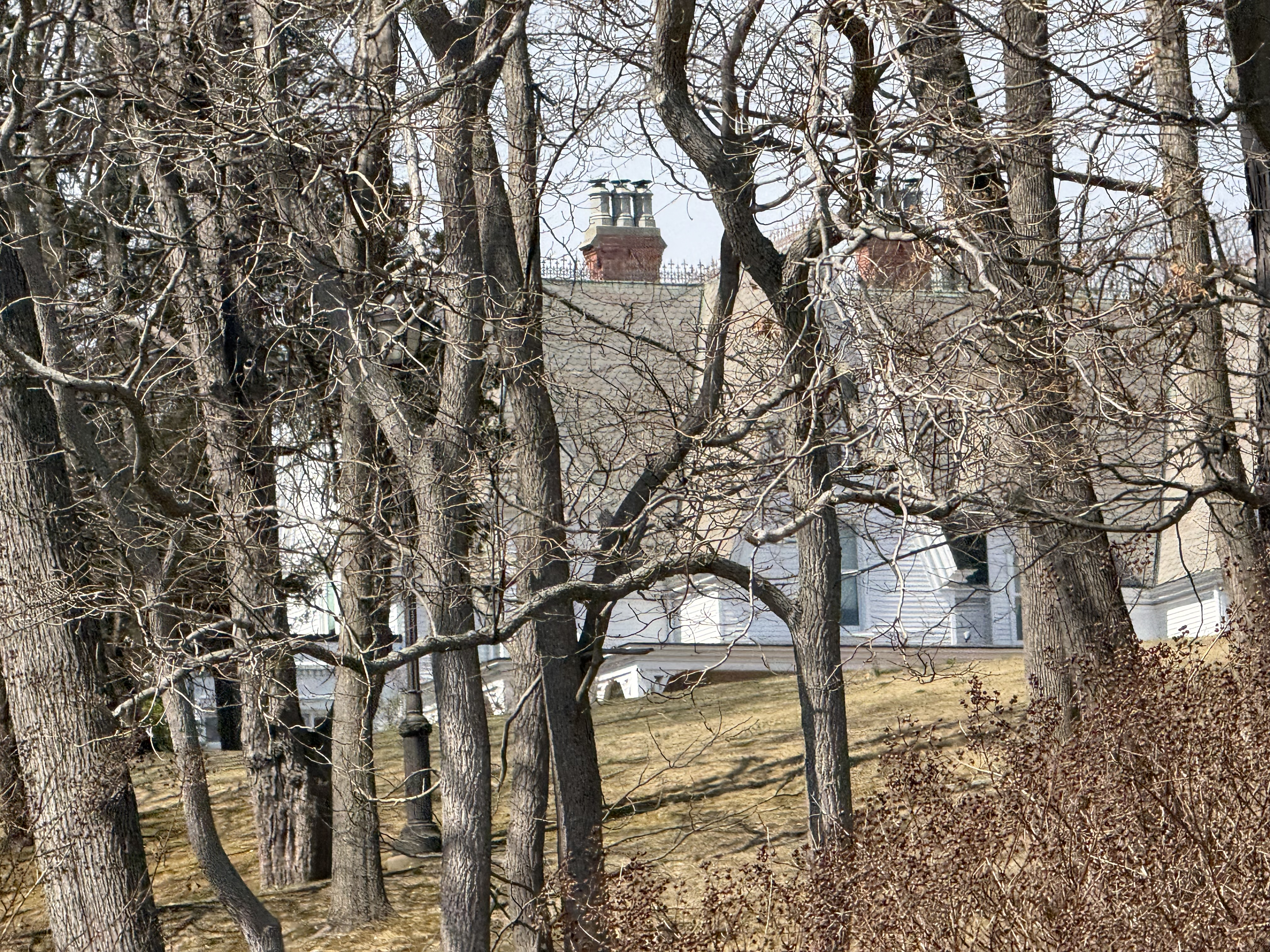
The Cliffs viewed through trees in 2026

It was designed by noted English architect Henry G. Harrison in 1863 and built for New York Hospital vice-president James William Beekman (1815-1877). It is a two-story, rectangular wood-framed dwelling with a steeply sloped, cross-gabled roof designed in the Gothic Revival style. It features hipped roof dormers, a relatively simple one story verandah, and is situated on a flat plateau atop a rocky outcropping. Also on the property are a superintendent's cottage, stable, carriage house, brick greenhouse, potting house, and the Spring Lake archaeological site.

It was listed on the National Register of Historic Places on December 12, 1973 and again on March 13, 1989 .
