= Henry G. Harrison =

American architect

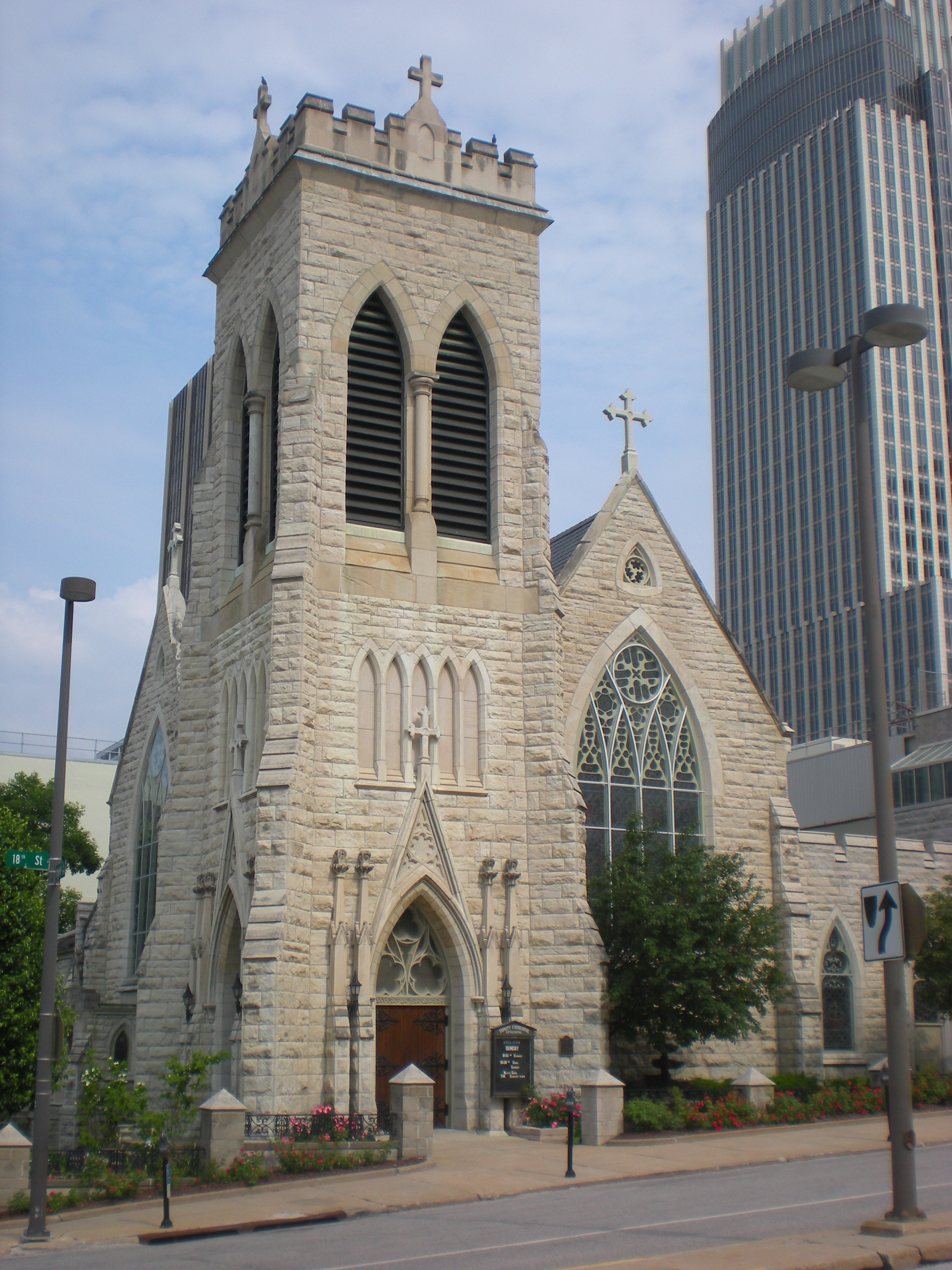
Trinity Cathedral (Omaha, Nebraska)

Henry G. Harrison (1813–1895) was a noted English architect who was apparently active in New York City between 1853 and 1891.

Several of his works in the United States are listed on the U.S. National Register of Historic Places.

Works include (with attribution):

- James William Beekman House, West Shore Rd. Oyster Bay, New York, Gothic Revival work (Harrison, Henry G.), NRHP-listed
- A. T. Stewart Era Buildings, 4th, 5th, and 6th Sts., Cathedral and Cherry Valley Aves. Garden City, New York (Harrison, Henry G.), NRHP-listed
- Trinity Cathedral (Omaha, Nebraska), 113 N. 18th St. Omaha, Nebraska, (Harrison, Henry G.), NRHP-listed
- Cathedral of the Incarnation (Garden City, New York), 36 Cathedral Avenue. Garden City, New York, (Harrison, Henry G.)
