= Beekman Peninsula =

Peninsula in Nunavut, Canada

Coordinates: 63°30′N 064°40′W

The Beekman Peninsula is located on southern Baffin Island in the Canadian territory of Nunavut. It's an arm of the larger Hall Peninsula. Beekman Peninsula juts into the Labrador Sea, and is surrounded by the Smith Channel, Cornelius Grinnell Bay, Robinson Sound, and Anderson Channel.
