= Wilhelmus Beekman =

Dutch politician (1623–1707)

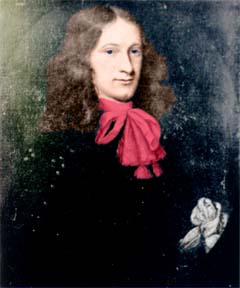

Mayor of New York City Acting
- In office 1682–1683
- Governor: Anthony Brockholls
- Preceded by: William Dyre
- Succeeded by: Cornelius Van Steenwyk

Deputy Mayor of New York City
- In office 1681–1683
- Governor: Anthony Brockholls

Governor of the Colony of Swedes
- In office 1658–1663
- Preceded by: Johan Risingh
- Succeeded by: William Penn, became the Province of Pennsylvania

Personal details
- Born: Wilhelmus Hendricksen Beekman; April 28, 1623 Hasselt, Overijssel, Dutch Republic
- Died: September 21, 1707 (aged 84) Rhinebeck, Province of New York
- Party: Independent
- Spouse: Catalina de Boogh
- Children: 9, including Gerardus
- Parent(s): Hendrick Beekman; Mary Baudartius
- Relatives: Willem Baudartius (grandfather); Rev. Gerardus Beekman (grandfather); Henry Beekman (grandson)
- Profession: Politician

Wilhelmus Hendricksen Beekman (April 28, 1623 – September 21, 1707) – also known as William Beekman and Willem Beekman (or Beeckman) – was a Dutch emigrant who came to New Amsterdam (now New York City) from the Netherlands on May 27, 1647 in the same vessel, Princess, with Director-General and later Governor Peter Stuyvesant.

Beekman soon became Treasurer of the Dutch West India Company, beginning a long life in public service that included being Mayor of New York City, Governor of Delaware (1653–1664), and Governor of Pennsylvania (1658–1663).

He is the progenitor of the Beekman family in America.

== Early life ==
Wilhelmus (William, Willem) Beekman was born at Hasselt, Overijssel, Netherlands, on April 28, 1623, to Hendrick Beekman and Mary Baudartius, who had married in 1621 at Zutphen, the Netherlands.

=== Family ===
His paternal grandfather, Rev. Gerardus Beekman was born in Cologne, received a University education, and studied theology at Frankendale in the Palatinate Region, from 1576 to 1578.

Beekman Arms granted by James I

He became one of the most learned scholars of his time. He is said to have been able to "speak, think and dream" in five languages. Rev. Beekman, who married Agnes Stunning, at Cleves, died at Emmerich in 1625, and Stunning died at Mülheim, Germany, in 1614.

Gerardus Beekman lived at a time when Europe was engaged in religious wars and Protestants had begun to seek refuge from persecution. The persecution of Protestants by the Archbishop of Cologne was the cause of Gerardus' settling in the neighboring city of Mülheim, a refuge for Protestants. Rev. Beekman took a prominent part in the support of the principles of the new church and was chosen one of the delegates to visit the Duke of New Berg, the Elector of Brandenburg and James I to secure their support in behalf of the reformed religion. His mission executed with so much credit to himself, James I caused the coat of arms of the Beekman family to be remodelled, to "a rose on either side of a running brook". Rev. Beekman was one of the distinguished scholars who translated the King James Bible from the original manuscripts into English, for James I, and for his services received special honors from the King.

His maternal grandfather, theologian Willem Baudartius, preacher in the town of Zutphen, was one of Dutch Calvinism's most zealously orthodox protagonists. As his participation in the Synod of Dort suggests, Baudartius enjoyed considerable stature as an intellectual leader. At the Synod he had participated not only in the formulation of the doctrines of the Dutch Reformed Church, but also in prescribing its forms of worship. Furthermore, he was one of the handful of scholars selected to make the authorized translation of the Bible into Dutch. In 1632, when the Old Testament translation was completed after many years of effort, it was immediately acclaimed on all sides and has been employed ever since.

== New Netherland ==
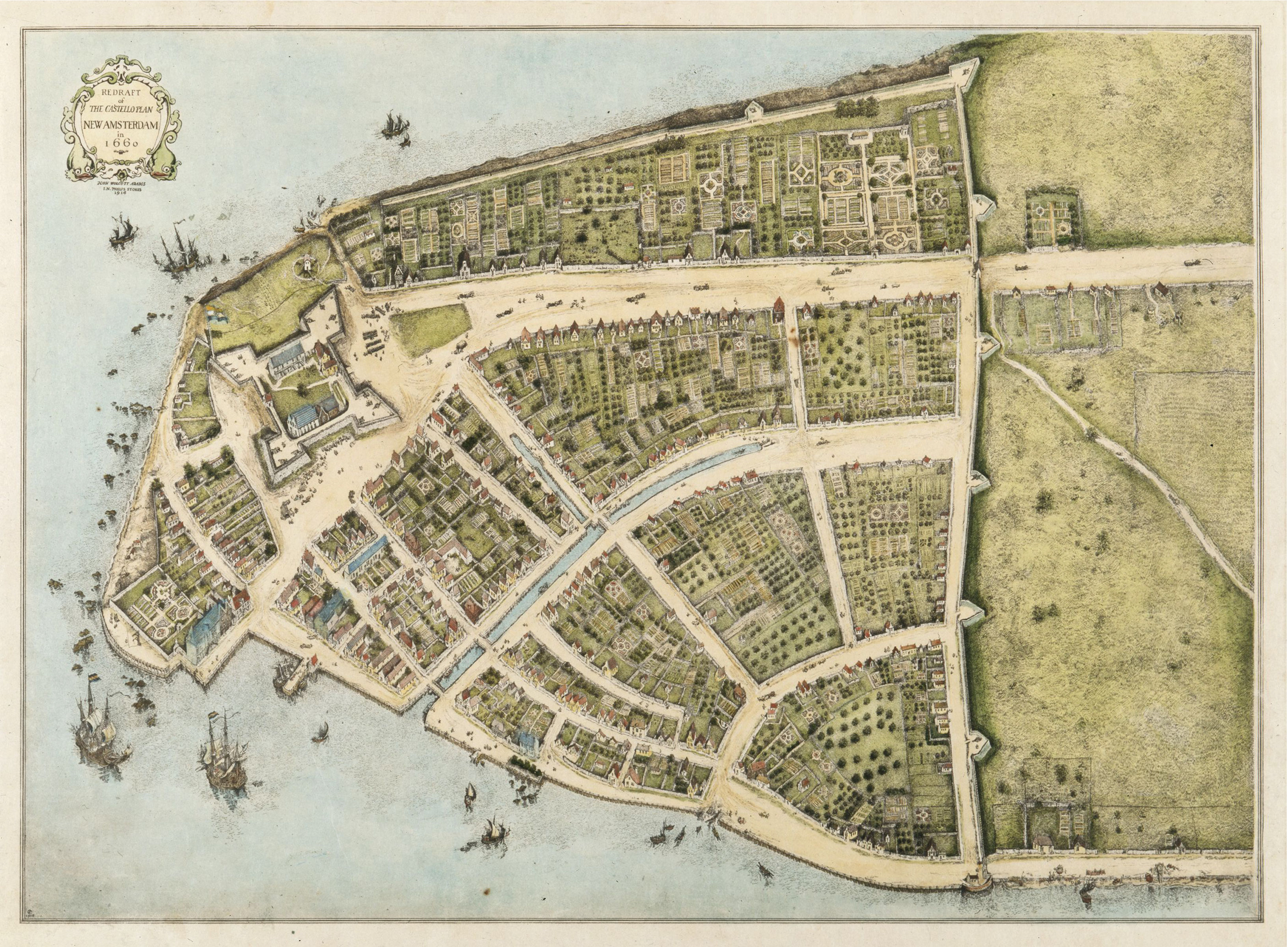
Map of Manhattan in 1660, based on the Castello Plan, with the fort on the left

Wilhelmus Beekman departed from Amsterdam at Christmas, 1646, bound for the settlement which the Dutch West India Company had established in the year of his birth on Manhattan Island.

The voyage from the Netherlands to the New World was long and arduous, Stuyvesant going by way of Curaçao in the Dutch West Indies on account of political considerations. In May 1647, Wilhelmus arrived in Nieuw Amsterdam aboard the Dutch merchant ship Princess Amelia. among the passengers was Director-General Pieter Stuyvesant.

Traveling by ship in the 1600s was not without its dangers; the Princess Amelia sank on its return voyage to Holland in September 1647. Only 21 of the 107 passengers survived.

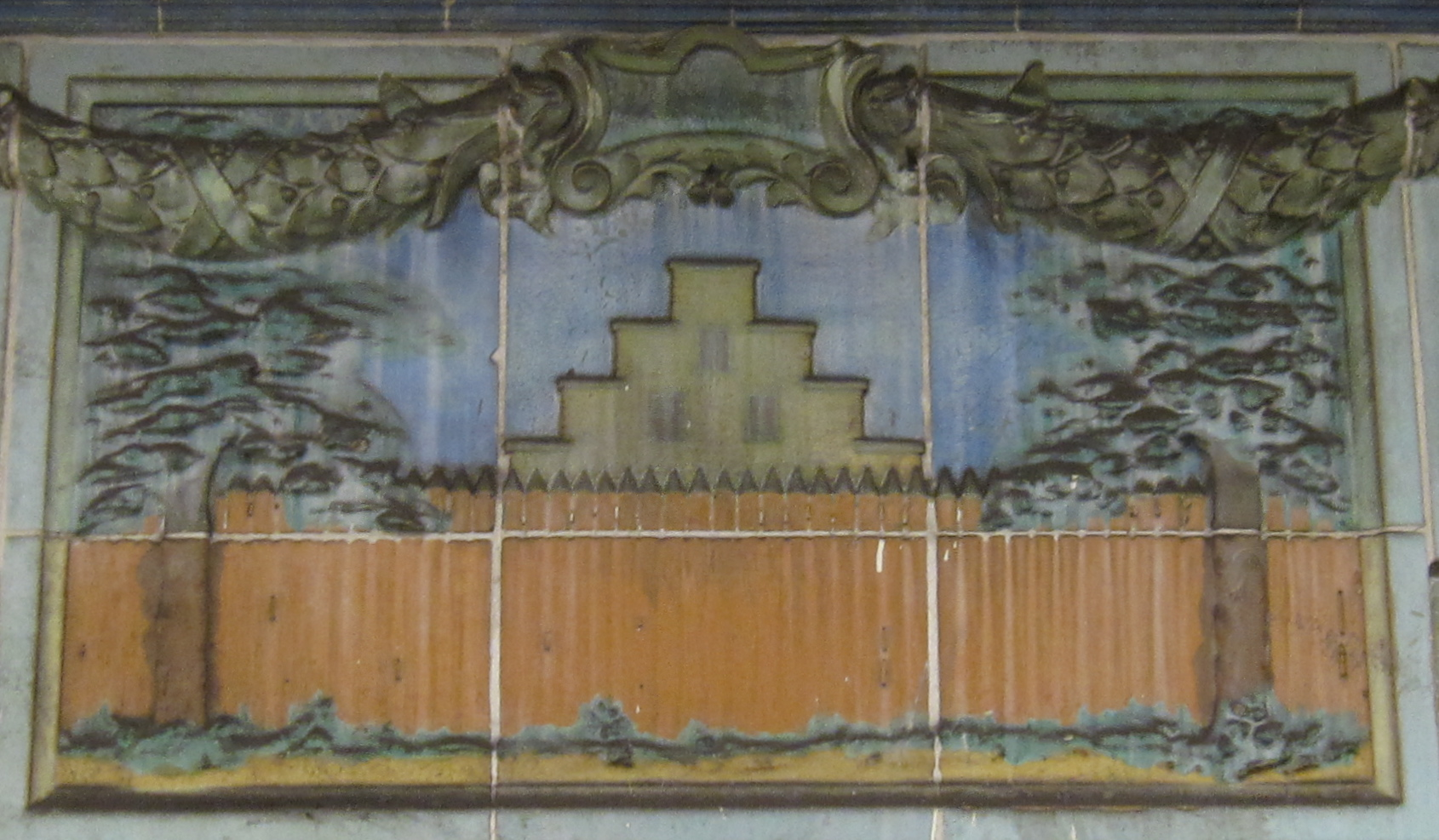
Depiction of the wall of New Amsterdam on a tile in Wall Street subway station on the 4 and 5 trains

=== Early political office ===
From the outset, he was identified with affairs of state and the government of the new city. A general meeting of the Director-General and Council of New Netherland was held with the Burgomasters and Schepens (magistrates) on 13 March, 1653, at which it was decreed that breastworks or a wall should be built to protect the city and that the cost should be levied against the estates. Peter Wolfersen Van Couwenhoven and Wilhelmus Beekman were chosen Commissioners and authorized to offer proposals, invite bids, and make the contract for the construction of the work. It was completed in May, 1653, and extended along the present Wall Street, skirting De Heere Gracht, an inlet of the bay, where Broad Street now is.

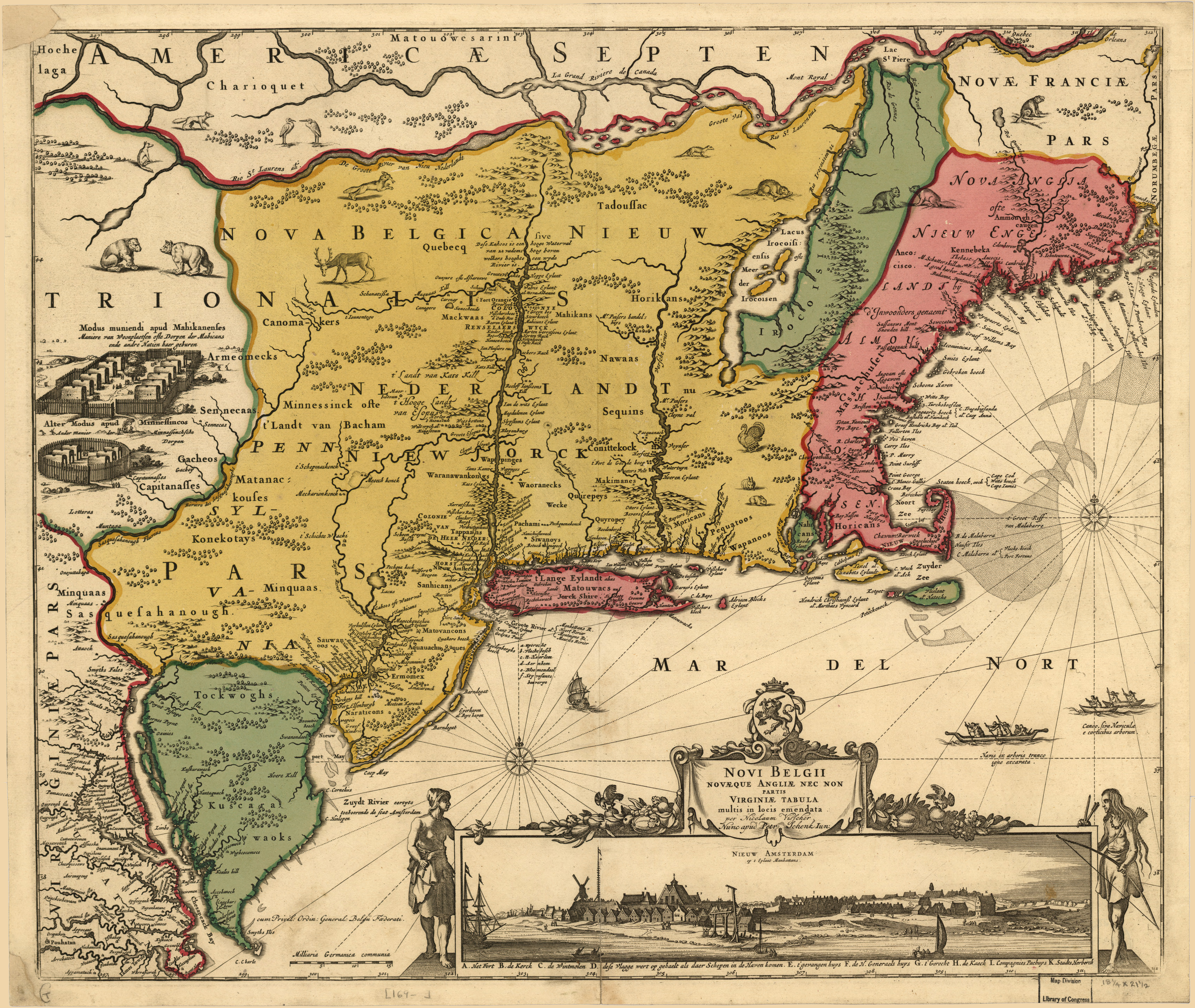
1685 reprint of a 1656 map of the Dutch North American colonies showing extent of Dutch claims, from Chesapeake Bay and the Susquehanna River in the South and West, to Narragansett Bay and the Providence-Blackstone Rivers in the East, to the St. Lawrence River in the North

In the same year, Wilhelmus Beekman was appointed one of the five Schepens of New Amsterdam. Beekman was a member of The Nine Men, 1652; Schepen in 1653, 1654, 1656 and 1657 (President), 1673; Burgomaster in 1674. Between 1652 and 1658, he served as Lieutenant of the Burgher Corps of New Amsterdam. In 1658, Beekman, while Vice Director of New Netherland, he added the title of Commissioner of Indian Affairs. His jurisdiction as Commissary at Esopus, now Kingston, and its dependencies extended from the Catskills, where that of Fort George terminated, to the Dans Kamer, a few miles above the Highlands, which was the northern limit of the jurisdiction of Fort Amsterdam. His home at Esopus was the scene of many memorable gatherings of distinguished men. He entertained there Governors Cartwright, Nichols, and Lovelace.

From 1648 to 1652, Beekman was a Selectman, and on February 2, 1653, he was appointed one of the five original schepens of New Amsterdam. With the First Anglo-Dutch War under way, on March 14, 1653, Beekman was appointed to join council member Montagne to supervise work fortifying the town. He served as a schepen until 1658.

=== Colony of Swedes and Third Anglo-Dutch War ===
On July 30, 1658, he received the appointment of Vice-Director or Governor of the Colony of Swedes (Delaware), through the influence of the Dutch West India Company. The capital, then known as New Amstel, is today New Castle. It was a challenging assignment as the population was largely Swedish and Finnish immigrants only recently conquered by the Dutch. Beekman resided at Altona, a new name for the former Swedish Fort Christina, now the city of Wilmington. It was located on the Delaware Bay, called South River by the Dutch, and he resided there until 1663, and then moved to Esopus, now Kingston, New York, to assume the duties of his new appointment as Schout (Sheriff) and Commissary at that place.

In 1664, Beekman was sheriff of New Amsterdamand in 1673, he was a lieutenant in the militia. In 1674, Beekman was elected Burgomaster and retained his office when the English gained control of the city following the second Anglo-Dutch War.

In March 1672, the third Anglo-Dutch War began and with the arrival of the Dutch fleet in July 1673, the English surrendered. Beekman was named a Schepen once again. By mid-August, the governmental pattern of pre-English years was fully established. However, by February 1674, the province was returned to the English in the Treaty of Westminster. When Andros, the Governor, arrived in 1674, Beekman was one of a committee of three to go on board The Diamond, to welcome the Governor, and ask for certain favors for the Dutch in New York.

=== New York City office ===
Before the end of 1678, William was back in office once more. Governor Edmund Andros had by then reorganized the government of the City of New York under a mayor, deputy mayor, and aldermen, all of whom he himself appointed. Beekman became an alderman in 1678 and was reappointed in 1679 and in 1680. In the latter year he advanced to the head of the list of aldermen and to the title of deputy mayor. The mayor at that time was Captain William Dyer, who was also Collector of Customs and a member of Gov. Andros' Council.

Hurried and preoccupied with other matters associated with his recall, the departing governor neglected to make specific provision for the renewal of the expiring authority for the collection of customs duties. Actually the authority expired in November 1680, but no attention was called to the matter for many months. Then, in May 1681, opportunity knocked for Beekman. Governor Andros had departed; the lieutenant-governor was temporarily absent from the province and Mayor Dyer, collector of customs, was laid low by illness. With no authority to continue the expired taxes without express orders from the Duke of York, Mayor Dyer, who was also tax collector, continued to levy customs taxes.

Dyer was summoned before the very court of which he was normally the presiding officer, that of the mayor and aldermen of the City of New York. With Deputy Mayor William Beekman presiding in his place, the court promptly ordered Dyer to surrender the goods which he had been holding for non-payment of customs.

The members of the mayor's court then intimated to Lieutenant Governor Anthony Brockholls and his council that the collector should be tried for usurping the power of government. The lieutenant governor in council committed Dyer to trial, and a grand jury was sworn. Collector (Mayor) Dyer was formally indicted for having "trayterously maliciously and advisedly used and exercised Regall power and authority over the Kings subjects." In July a petit jury was sworn and twenty witnesses had been heard for the prosecution before the defendant confounded his accusers by demanding to know the authority of the commission which was trying him. After consultations among themselves the self-righteous patriots decided to send the defendant to England "to be proceeded against as his Majesty and Council shall direct."

William Beekman and his fellow aldermen continued to administer municipal matters and Brockholls discreetly reappointed all of them in 1681 and 1682 without attempting to name a successor to the unfortunate Mayor Dyer.

=== Acting Mayor of New York ===
Beekman was Deputy Mayor of New York from 1681 to 1683, and from 1682 to 1683 was acting mayor. Col. Thomas Dongan, 2nd Earl of Limerick, was appointed Governor of the Duke of York's Province of New York in 1683. With instructions from the Duke, Gov. Dongan sailed from England to America, finally reaching New York City on August 25, 1683. In 1683, when Thomas Dongan became governor, Beekman was mayor of New York, and was one of those appointed to survey Fort James. Rev. John Gordon became chaplain of the English soldiers in New York, and Mayor William Beekman, Stephanus Van Cortlandt, Lucas Santen, Mark Talbot, and Gabriel Minvielle were appointed to survey Fort James, while Captain Thomas Young was made pilot of the port.

The instructions given Gov. Dongan contained a provision for the creation of an Assembly of eighteen members to be elected by the freeholders. In preparation for the election of an Assembly William Beekman and the aldermen ordered a census to be completed "with all possible speed". As acting Mayor since the elimination of Dyer more than two years before, Beekman occupied a post which gave him great prestige in the eyes of the inhabitants.

On November 9, 1683, Dongan received a petition signed by William Beekman, mayor, Johannes Van Brugh, John Laurence, Peter J. Morris, James Graham, Cornelius Van Steenwyck, and Nicholas Bayard, aldermen of the city, petitioning for a city charter. With the city's charter granted, on November 24 the "old magistrates" were discharged, ending Beekman's term, and Cornelius Van Steenwyk was appointed mayor.

=== Alderman of New York ===
Beekman was elected East Ward Aldermen in 1685, and served to 1696, when he retired due to old age. In 1696, he was one of the Elders who sought and received an official charter from the royal authorities for the Reformed Dutch Church.

== Real estate ==
Beekman brought wealth from the Old World and invested it wisely in New Amsterdam. In 1652, he purchased a farm known as Corlaer's Hook from Jacob Corlaer where Beekman lived with his bride and was fully launched into the delightful society of the Dutch city. At the time, the East River ran much farther inland than at present, and a large portion of the territory between Fulton Street and Corlear's Hook was salt meadow, scarcely fit for grazing. This land, about midway between Broadway and Chatham Street, was originally a large pond, denominated by the Dutch kolck or marsh, which they also designated as the Fresh Water, and a stream or rivulet from it running eastward, and crossing Chatham Street, between Pearl and Roosevelt Streets, and having there a bridge over it. Additional purchases that formed the basis of the family's wealth included the land now bounded on the north by Nassau, on the west by Ann, and as far as Gold, Pearl, Fulton, and Frankfort streets, and also the swamp below Pearl Street, which from that time on was known as "Beekman's Swamp" to Frankfort Square. He added land to his farm land owned by Isaac de Forest, near what is now 126th Street, on the upper end of Manhattan Island, destined to later become Harlem.

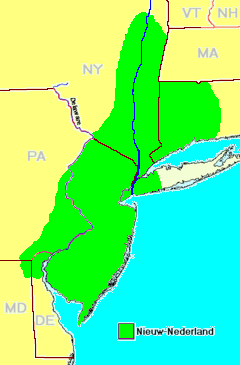
Area settled by the Dutch in 1660

By 1658, Beekman was a prosperous family-man of thirty-five. He received by patent, 20 June 1655, a tract of land beyond the Kalck Hoek, or Collect. Difficulties arose about the right of way through this land for cattle pastured on the Commons. This cattle-path was probably the origin of Beekman Street. He held properties at Corlaer's Hook and in Harlem as well as the land on which his house stood, the north side of the present site of Chatham Square. He was also a brewer, as were many of the town's leading citizens, and the proprietor of a flour mill.

During the period of 1658–1671, Beekman conducted several significant real estate transactions of lands he had amassed since his arrival in New Amsterdam. In 1666, he sold to Peter Stuyvesant some forty-six acres near what is now 34th Street, helping to form what became known as Stuyvesant's Bouwery Number 2. In 1667, he sold to Domine Megapolenses the house at Chatham Square where he had once lived and in 1668, disposed of the entire Corlaer plantation to Stephanus Van Cortlandt and Cornelius Van Steenwyk, two of the town's wealthiest citizens.

In 1670, he purchased from Thomas Hall property an extensive farm along the East River, now Pearl Street and bounded by Nassau Street on the west. The southerly boundary of the farm was where Fulton Street now is and the northerly boundary was Beekman's Swamp, then called the Kripple Bush. It included a brew house, a mill, horse mill, and an orchard. To these he later added an adjoining piece of meadowland purchased at public auction. At this farm he took up residence in the spring of 1671, when he was relieved of his duties as schout at Esopus. According to Valentine's History of New York, Beekman's Swamp was sold in 1734 to Jacobus Roosevelt for two hundred pounds by the corporation. He used beer to pay his taxes in 1672 and was referred to publicly as "brewer". Later it became clear that William was also a shipowner who engaged in trade and privateering in the Caribbean area.

In 1676, Beekman added to his land holdings purchasing the land of Thomas Hall, with a house facing the East River and a brew house on it.

Around 1696, he purchased a large tract of land on the Hudson from local Indians, today known as the Rhinebeck Patent, and built on it a stone house and called the estate "Rhinebeck". It was still standing in 1877. The bricks of the chimney were imported from the Netherlands. The place was named for the river Rhine in Europe, upon the banks of which Beekman was born.

== Personal life ==
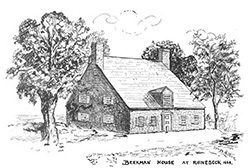
Beekman Home at Rhinebeck abt 1688

Following his emigration to America, Wilhelmus Beekman married Catalina de Boogh on September 5, 1649, a belle in the society of New Amsterdam and the daughter of the wealthy Hendricks de Boogh of Albany, New York. They had the following children:

1. Maria Beekman (1650–1679), who married Nicholas William Stuyvesant, son of Governor Peter Stuyvesant, on January 5, 1672
2. Hendrick "Henry" Beekman (1652–1716), a Judge who married Johanna de Loper Davidson, daughter of Captain Jacob de Loper and Cornelia Melyn. Johanna, who was a widow of Joris Davidson, was the granddaughter of Cornelius Melyn, Patroon of Staten Island. Henry Beekman served as a Justice of the Peace for Ulster County.
3. Gerardus Beekman (1653–1723), who was elected president of the council and acting governor of the Province of New York in 1710.
4. Cornelia Beekman (1655–1679), who married Isaac Van Vleck on September 19, 1674
5. Johannes Beekman (1656–1751), who married Aeltje Thomas Popinga. He is the progenitor of the numerous Beekmans of Kingston
6. Jacobus Beekman (1658–1679)
7. Wilhelmus Beekman (1661–1702), who died unmarried
8. Martin Beekman (b. 1663)
9. Catherine Beekman (1668–1707).

Beekman occupied the Beekman homestead on the estate purchased from Thomas Hall, in a home about where Pearl and Frankfort Streets are today, until his death on September 21, 1707, at the age of eighty-five years.

=== Descendants ===
Colonel Henry Beekman, his grandson through his eldest son Henry Beekman, attained considerable prominence and had a daughter, Cornelia, who married Gilbert Livingston, son of Robert Livingston, first Lord of Livingston Manor; and another daughter, Margaret, married Robert Livingston (1718-1775), a cousin of Gilbert. Colonel Henry Beekman was the recipient of two large tracts of land in Dutchess County, NY. One in the area of Rhinebeck, NY and the other, called the Back Lots or Beekman Patent, in the South east corner of Dutchess County. See Settlers of Beekman Patent for families who lived in this patent which was a manorial estate of the Beekman and Livingston families, who leased the land until the early 19th century. Former US president Franklin Delano Roosevelt claimed to be descended from him.

=== Legacy ===
William Beekman helped to establish a measure of self-government for the Dutch hamlet which was to become a great city. He was a perennial political leader under both English and Dutch rule and played an instrumental role in securing a municipal charter from the English authorities for New York City. His most important service to posterity, however, was to fight vigorously for more representative governmental institutions.

Wilhelmus Beekman's name is perpetuated in the names of William Street and Beekman Street, New York City, which latter became legally a street in 1734. The Beekman homestead in New Amsterdam was built by Wilhelmus Beekman in 1670 near the present corner of Pearl and Beekman Streets. A street was laid out through the property and was designated Beekman Street by the public in his honor. As New York City grew new streets were opened where formerly the farmers had only the easement or right of way. This was the origin of Beekman Street, which was laid out and graded in 1752, although since 1656 the farmers had the right to drive their cattle to the commons through it. A second thoroughfare, running at a right angle to the first was called William Street, after Beekman's first, or Christian, name. Beekman Tower, the 76-story skyscraper designed by architect Frank Gehry and later renamed 8 Spruce Street, first utilized the Beekman name due to its proximity to Beekman Street.

Rhinebeck, Dutchess County, New York and Beekmantown, a town in Clinton County, New York are named for him. The name Rhinebeck is a combination of the name of the man who founded the town, Wilhelmus Beekman, and his native home, Rhineland. Beekman was one of the original grantees of the area that became Beekmantown. The town of Beekman, Dutchess County, New York, is named for his son, Col. Henry Beekman, who owned a grant there in 1703, known as the Beekman Patent.

In the Rhinebeck Village Historic District is the Beekman Arms Inn, claimed to be the oldest continuously-operated inn in the United States. The historic hotel in the Hudson Valley has operated continuously since 1766.
