= John Durand (painter) =

American painter

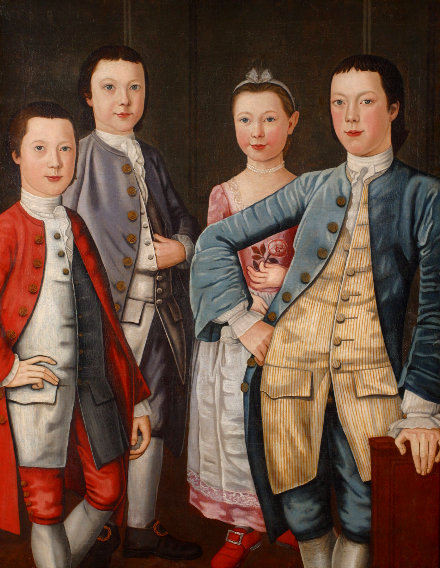
The Rapalje Children, c. 1768, oil on canvas, in the collection of the New-York Historical Society

John Durand (active 1765–1782) (Note: Several websites state that Durand was born in 1731 and died in 1805, but the source for this information is unknown.) was a colonial American portraitist. With John Mare, Abraham Delanoy, and Lawrence Kilburn, he was one of a number of portraitists living and working in New York City during the 1760s.

Nothing is known of Durand's origins, training or upbringing, as is often the case with colonial American painters. As he is referred to in two different known sources as "monsieur Duran" it has been assumed that he was of French descent. This assumption has been bolstered by the rococo colors used in his paintings, which some sources have taken to suggest that if not born in France he was at least trained there. It appears more likely, however, that he is the same "John Durand" that was apprenticed to Charles Catton in London on September 15, 1760, for a seven-year term. Just when Durand emigrated is unknown; he is first recorded in Virginia in 1765, but by 1766 was in New York City, where an entry in the account book of James Beekman records payment to the artist for portraits of the six Beekman children. In 1767 he advertised the opening of a drawing school in New York, on Broad Street. New York remained his base of operations for some years, although signatures on a number of portraits indicate that he returned to Virginia in 1769, 1771, 1775, and 1780. According to his nephew, Robert Sully, he was prolific there; Sully wrote of him that "He painted an immense number of portraits in Virginia; his works are hard and dry, but appear to have been strong likenesses, with less vulgarity of style than artists of his calibre generally possess." He is known to have traveled to Connecticut twice for work; a 1768 advertisement from the Connecticut Journal survives, and suggests that he planned on a sojourn of at least a few months in the colony. A trip to Bermuda is also known. By 1770 he was in Virginia, working in Williamsburg and later in Petersburg. Durand drops out of sight as an artist after 1775, when he signed and dated a pair of portraits of Mr. and Mrs. Gray Briggs of Dinwiddie County, Virginia. It has been suggested that he remained in Virginia, as the only other references to him after that point are a painting from Virginia dated 1781 and an entry in the Dinwiddie County tax rolls of 1782. It has also been claimed that he was working in Chesterfield County in 1780. One source claims that he returned to England after this point, an assertion which does not appear to be supported anywhere else.

Durand has been described as the "most consistently delightful" of the painters working in New York during the 1760s. His approach to painting was linear and decorative, and suggests training as a decorative painter. Like many other painters of the era he saw no need to restrict himself to representational painting; a 1770 advertisement from The Virginia Gazette reveals that he would "paint, gild, and varnish wheel carriages; and put coats of arms, or ciphers upon them." While living in New York he described himself as a history painter, but no history paintings by his hand are known. Little is known of his artistic influences, but some scholars have seen in his later work indication that he was familiar with the paintings of John Singleton Copley, as he began more sophisticated attempts at modeling his figures in the mid-1770s. Certain stylistic peculiarities distinguish Durand's work from that of other painters; these include a peculiar splayed display of fingers, in which one or two are lifted and separated from the rest. His female sitters hold a single flower in one hand, frequently near the bosom, and sometimes the flowers are turned on their stems to reveal a star-shaped array of leaves.

Durand's earliest surviving works date to his time in New York; they are so assured as to indicate that he had already had ample practice as a portraitist, but no earlier paintings are known to exist. Besides the Beekman family he was known to other prominent families in New York, including the Rays and the Rapaljes; his group portrait of The Rapalje Children (including George Rapalje), dating to around 1768 and currently in the collection of the New-York Historical Society, is widely adjudged his most successful work. Other surviving portraits include a pendant pair in the National Gallery of Art, a portrait in the Museum of the City of New York, and two unconnected works in the Metropolitan Museum of Art. A pair of portraits attributed to Durand were sold by Sotheby's in 2014 for $389,000.
