= John Mare (painter) =

American painter and businessman

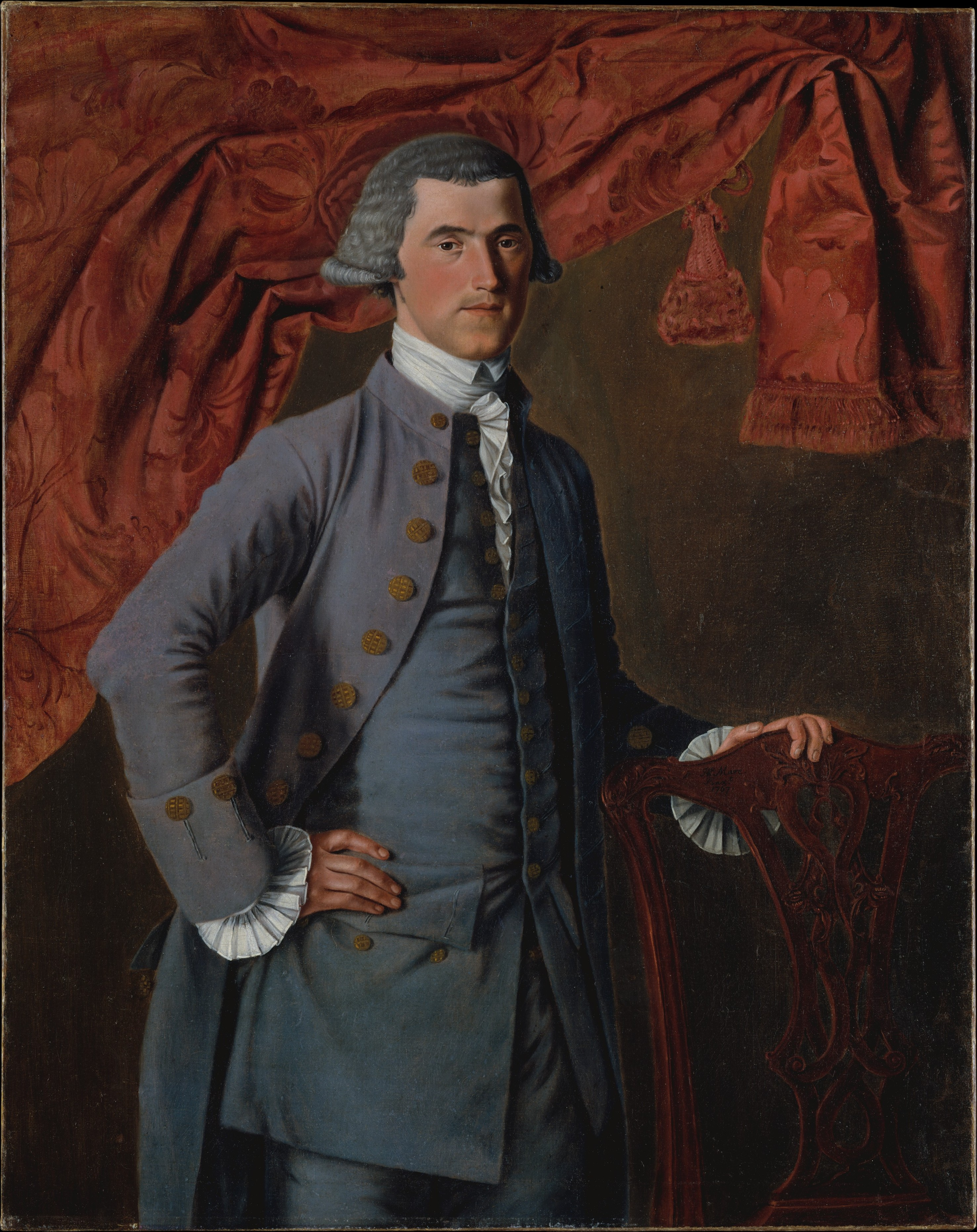
Jeremiah Platt by John Mare, in the collection of the Metropolitan Museum of Art

John Mare, Jr. (born New York City, 1739; died Edenton, North Carolina between June, 1802 and April, 1803) was an American painter, businessman, and public figure.

== Life ==
Mare was born in New York City, the son of John Mare, of Devonshire, and Mary Bes Mare, presumed to be of Dutch origin. His sister Mary was the wife of the painter William Williams, who may have taught him, although nothing is known of his training as an artist or of his education otherwise. His father is variously described in records as a mariner and laborer, and may have been illiterate.

Mare is recorded in Albany, New York after 1759; in that year he moved to the city with his wife, Anne Morris, and his son was baptized there in 1760. Both appear to have died early; there is no mention of them in the will of John Mare, Sr., dated 1761. In that same year Mare is supposed to have returned to New York City, as the will makes no mention of residence in Albany. The first direct mention of Mare's profession comes in 1765; on October 1 of that year he was admitted to the freedom of the city of New York under the name and title of "John Mare Jr., Limner". Evidence suggests that he was in Boston around 1767 and again in 1768, but by 1772 he was back in Albany seeking work, having mortgaged his property on Mulberry Street in 1771 to pay for the trip. Sometime in the next two years he returned to New York City, executing his last two known portraits while there.

Mare is believed to have moved to North Carolina by 1778; he is last recorded in New York the year prior. The reason for the move is unknown; however, while Mare had been nearly the only painter in New York City for much of his early career, competing only with Lawrence Kilburn for custom, the arrival of John Durand and Abraham Delanoy on the scene may have influenced his decision somewhat. In Edenton he became a businessman, apparently abandoning painting once and for all; no record of any artwork by Mare in North Carolina has yet been found. By 1780 he had become a partner in the firm Mare & Cooley, and had taken out one-sixteenth interest in the schooner Ostrich. For some fifteen years he was successful, opening trade with the West Indies and acquiring property in surrounding counties; he is also known to have owned slaves. However, he fell into financial difficulty in his last years, and appears to have suffered from a debilitating illness as well, which may have prevented his putting his affairs in order.

Mare was a supporter of the Revolutionary cause from the time he came to North Carolina, providing supplies for the state's troops during the war. When Albemarle Sound was invaded by the British, he contributed £1,000 to the effort to battle their forces. In 1780 a ship of which he was part owner, the Fair American, was captured by the British, causing him significant financial loss; among its passengers, who were transported to London, was future congressman Thomas Wynns.

Mare married again while in North Carolina, in 1784; his second wife was Marion Boyd Wells, a widow. Little else is known of her save that she and her sister Lydia had been signatories to the resolutions of the Edenton Tea Party. She died long before him, leaving him two young daughters, Mary and Elizabeth Ann. He was a member of St. Paul's Church, Edenton, and may have been buried in its churchyard; the exact date of his death is unknown, as no obituaries have been found either in the press or in Masonic records of the era. At his death he left almost nothing to his children, who were taken in by the family of their aunt Lydia.

Mare's nephew, son of Mary, was the painter William Joseph Williams.

=== Public life ===
Mare served as Edenton's first postmaster beginning in 1786. He also served in numerous other public capacities in Chowan County; he was county coroner from 1786 to 1788, and also in 1786 became Edenton's town treasurer. He was first called to serve on the grand jury in March 1785. In 1789 he became a town commissioner, and served in both capacities from some years. He became a justice of the peace in 1787, and held that role until 1799; he often served as an auditor of legal accounts during this time.

In 1787 Governor Samuel Johnston appointed Mare to the North Carolina Council of State. He served three terms on the council, and was renominated yet again in 1789; as Johnston did not take up his reappointment as governor, Mare was not reappointed at this time. In that same year Mare was chosen to represent Edenton at the convention in which North Carolina ratified the United States Constitution; he voted for ratification.

Mare was a Mason, and is known to have attended Masonic meetings in Albany in 1772. He later transferred his membership to St. John's Lodge No. 2 (now St. John's Lodge No. 1, A.Y.M.) in New York City before transferring it again, this time to Unanimity Lodge in Edenton, in 1778. He became master of this lodge in 1779, and for twenty years remained its mainspring. Mare is also believed to have assisted in drafting the constitution of the Grand Lodge of North Carolina; he presided over the convention in Tarboro which revived it in 1787, having been elected with Stephen Cabarrus to represent Edenton. He was also a prominent member of the Anglican church in Chowan County.

== Work ==
Not much is known of Mare's training, although his portraits share some of the characteristics found in the work of colonial New York painter Thomas McIlworth. His earliest surviving portrait, of fewer than a dozen known, is of Henry Livingston, dating to 1760; a painting of Henry's brother Robert, similar in appearance, is unsigned and undated, but presumed to be his work also. Both are believed to be copies of works by John Wollaston, as is Mare's portrait of Henry Lloyd of Boston, dating to around 1767. In 1766 the Common Council of New York commissioned a portrait of George III. A 1767 portrait of John Keteltas (in the New York Historical Society collection) is distinguished by a trompe l'oeil house fly on the sitter's cuff, poised as if on the surface of the painting. In 1768, again in Boston, Mare painted John Torrey; he is presumed to have painted Torrey's brother William as well. A portrait of Gerard Beekman from 1769 is believed to be by the artist, as is an undated portrait of an unknown member of the Werden-Wilcocks family. In 1772, during his return sojourn in Albany, Mare painted John Johnson, a portrait which today hangs in Johnson Hall in Johnstown.

A pastel portrait by Mare in the Shelburne Museum is also known; it depicts John C. Couvenhoven, and is dated 1774. Also dating from that year is a portrait of Benjamin Youngs Prime, currently in the New York Historical Society collection; these two are the last dated portraits ascribed to Mare, and it appears he stopped painting at this point.

Mare's best-known work today is the portrait of merchant Jeremiah Platt currently in the collection of the Metropolitan Museum of Art. It is thinly painted; rather than apply glazing, the artist chose to blend still-wet pigments on the surface of the painting to create texture. The portrait is the only one of its kind, three-quarter length, known by the artist's hand; judging by the prominence he gives to the chair on which Platt leans, and the damask drapery background, it appears that he was unfamiliar with the format and compensated accordingly. The portrait suggests knowledge of the work of John Singleton Copley, and is adjudged as Mare's most successful known piece; he is otherwise thought of as an average painter, and his style has been described as "stiff and awkward".
