= Francis Williams (polymath) =

Jamaican scholar and polymath (c. 1690 – c. 1770)

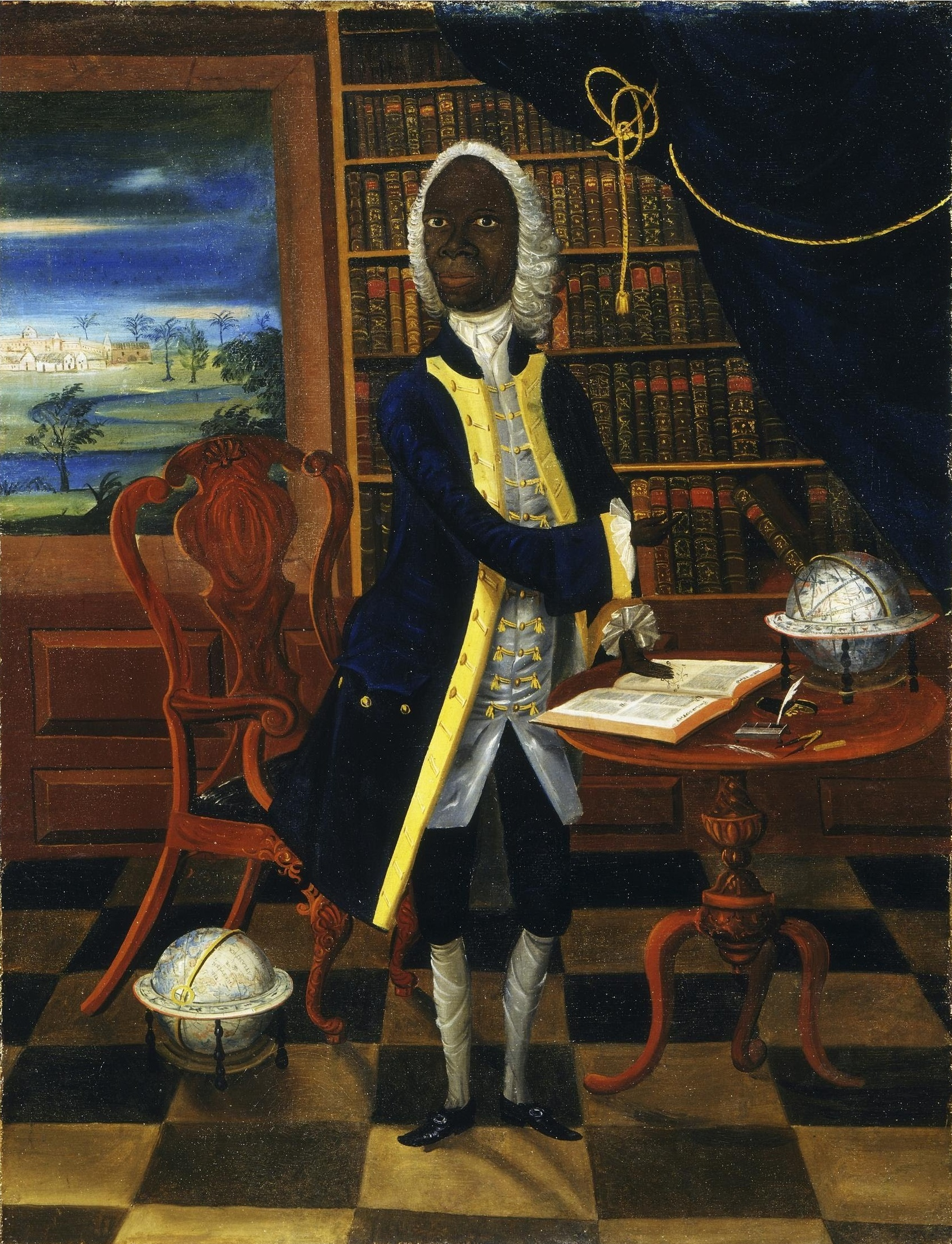
Portrait by William Williams (no relation), c. 1760

Francis Williams (c. 1690 – c. 1770) was a Jamaican polymath, scholar, astronomer and poet who was one of the most notable free black people in Jamaica. Born in Kingston, Jamaica, into a slaveholding family, Williams subsequently travelled to England where he officially became a British subject. After returning to Jamaica, he established a free school for free people of colour in Jamaica. His portrait is considered to be the earliest-known example in the canon of western art to have been commissioned by a known Black person to record their own intellectual achievements.

Due to poor archival conditions, most information about Williams comes from a lengthy racist attack on him by his white contemporary Edward Long, and from the portrait itself, which displays some of Williams' library and shows that he had observed the return of Halley's Comet which confirmed Newton's laws of motion. The portrait was purchased by Long after Williams' death.

== Early life ==
Francis Williams was born c. 1690 in the English colony of Jamaica to John and Dorothy Williams, both of whom were free people of colour. John had been emancipated in 1699 through the will and testament of his former enslaver. The Williams family's status as free, property-owning black people set them apart from other Jamaican inhabitants, who were at the time mostly white colonists and enslaved Africans. Eventually, the Williams family property expanded to include both land and slaves. Although it was rare for black people in the 18th century to receive an education, Francis Williams and his siblings were able to afford schooling due to their father's wealth. Francis travelled to Europe, where he was reported to be in 1721.

== In England ==
On 8 August 1721, Williams became a member of Lincoln's Inn in London, one of the four Inns of Court for barristers of England and Wales. Williams was allowed to attend scientific Royal Society meetings, but in 1716, when he was proposed by Martin Folkes as a fellow of the Royal Society at a large meeting—in the presence of Isaac Newton and Edmond Halley—he was denied membership by a subsequent committee "on account of his complection".

Williams was officially made a British subject and took the oath of citizenship in 1723.

Edward Long, a colonial administrator who was an exponent of racist theories and a supporter of slavery, attempted to undermine William's achievements by reporting that he was the beneficiary of a social experiment devised by John Montagu, 2nd Duke of Montagu to determine whether adequate education could lead Williams to match the intellectual achievements of his white contemporaries. This story holds that the Duke paid for Williams to attend an English grammar school and then continue at the University of Cambridge, a narrative likely originating from Montagu's relationships with Job Ben Solomon and Ignatius Sancho. However, Cambridge has no record of Williams' attendance; furthermore the Williams family's wealth could have easily supported his overseas education without the Duke's sponsorship.

== In Jamaica ==
In the 1720s, Williams returned to Jamaica, where he set up a free school for black children. In 18th-century Jamaica, most free schools were only open to the children of poor white inhabitants. Wealthy planters had bequeathed property and funds to establish foundations to educate poor white children and people of colour who could be classified as white. In his school, Williams taught reading, writing, Latin and mathematics. Supporters of slavery, such as Long, tried to downplay the educational accomplishments of Williams. Long's History of Jamaica contains a note about the possible attribution of "Welcome, Brother Debtor", a folk tune that gained popularity in Britain during the 18th century, to Williams or to Wetenhall Wilkes.

In Jamaica, Williams kept enslaved people he inherited from his father. He also encountered discrimination: In 1724, a white planter named William Brodrick insulted Williams, calling him a "black dog", whereupon Williams reacted by calling Brodrick a "white dog" several times. Brodrick punched Williams, as a result of which his "mouth was bloody", but Williams retaliated, after which Brodrick's "shirt and neckcloth had been tore (sic) by the said Williams". Williams insisted that since he was a free black man, he could not be tried for assault, as would have been the case with black slaves who hit a white man, because he was defending himself.

The Assembly, which comprised elected white planters, was alarmed at the success with which Williams argued his case, and how he secured the dismissal of Brodrick's attempts to prosecute him. Complaining that "Williams's behaviour is of great encouragement to the negroes of the island in general", the Assembly then decided to "bring in a bill to reduce the said Francis Williams to the state of other free negroes in this island". This legislation made it illegal for any black person in Jamaica to strike a white person, even in self-defence.

== Poetry ==
"An Ode to George Haldane" (excerpt)

Rash councils now, with each malignant plan,
Each faction, in that evil hour began,
At your approach are in confusion fled,
Nor while you rule, shall raise their dastard head.
Alike the master and the slave shall see
Their neck reliv'd, the yoke unbound by thee.

"Welcome, welcome Brother Debtor" (excerpt)

What was it made great Alexander
Weep at his unfriendly fate
twas because he cou'd not Wander
beyond the World's strong Prison Gate
For the World is also bounded
by the heavens and Stars above
Why should We then be confounded
Since there's nothing free but Jove.

== Legacy ==
The Victoria and Albert Museum acquired a portrait of Francis Williams in 1928 because of its depiction of mahogany furniture, rather than its human subject.

The painting was most likely made by William Williams, c. 1760.

In 2024, academic Fara Dabhoiwala published a reevaluation of the painting, drawn from scans and x-rays of the portrait, which revealed that the work is likely to have been commissioned by Williams himself c. 1760 to commemorate his computing and observing the trajectory of Halley's Comet over Jamaica in 1759. Until its publication, credit for confirming Edmund Halley's work on the comet's reappearance had not been given to Williams.

On 7 April 2025, the International Astronomical Union named the main-belt asteroid 20610 Franciswilliams in his honour.

== See also ==
- Black elite, Williams' class in Britain
- Ignatius Sancho, another protégé of the Montagu family
- Phillis Wheatley, another early Black poet writing in English contemporaneously
