= Thomas McIlworth =

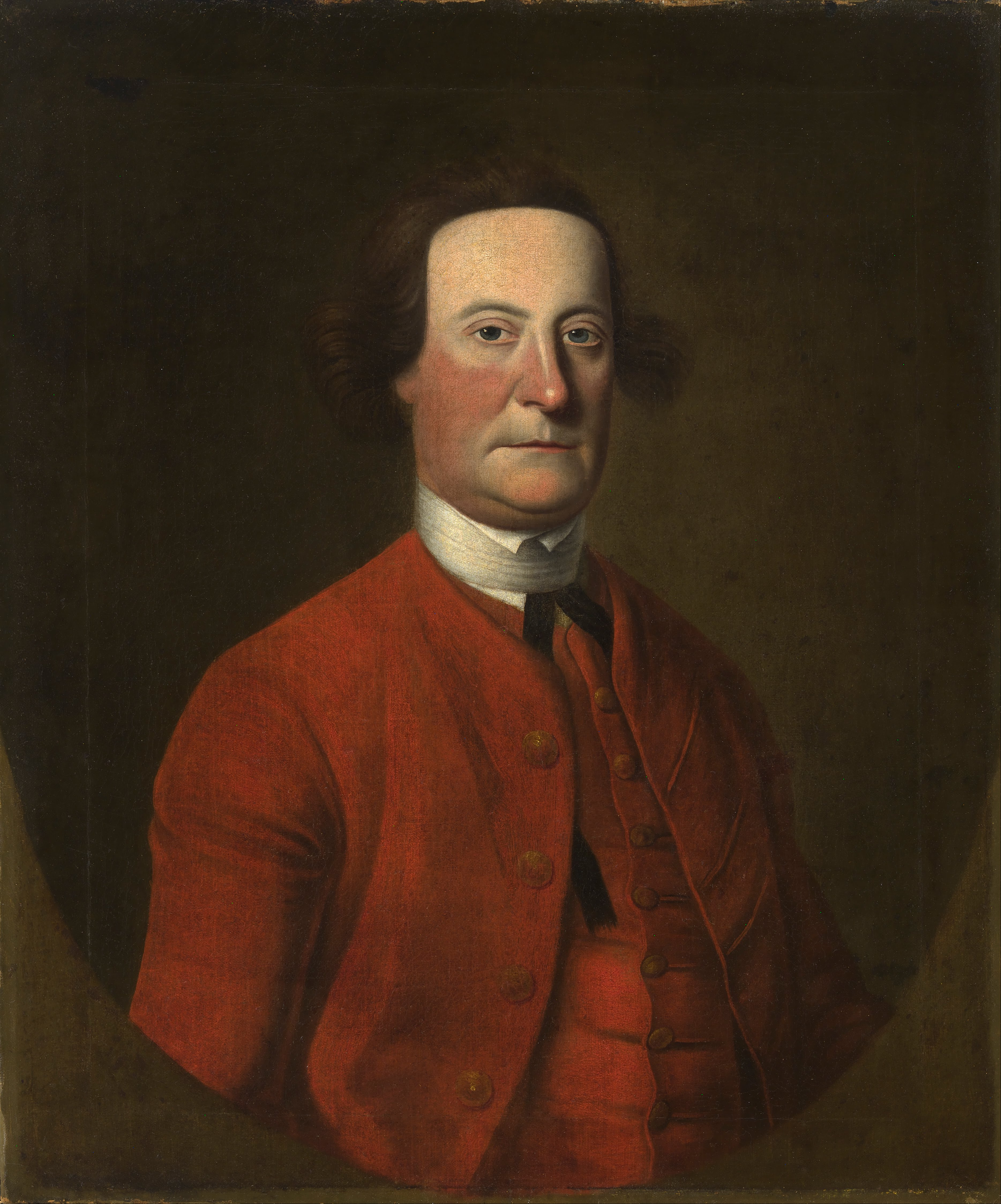
John Bradstreet, c. 1764, oil on canvas, in the National Portrait Gallery

Thomas McIlworth (c.1720—c.1769?) was a colonial American portraitist, mainly active in the area around Schenectady, New York.

McIlworth was born in Scotland around 1720; his father was the painter Andrew McIlwraith, and his mother Anne was the daughter of portraitist William Mosman. When he emigrated to America, he is known to have been in New York City by 1757, and advertising his work (as "Andrew McElworth") in local papers by 1758. Five years after moving to New York, he left in search of more commissions, settling in Schenectady and painting a number of prominent locals, as well as residents of Albany. He married Anna Statia (or Anastasia) Willet of New Jersey in October, 1760; the pair are believed to have lived in Westchester County for some while, and had a number of children before her death in 1766.

McIlworth's influence has been discerned in the work of another colonial New York painter, John Mare, but the nature of their relationship is unknown.
