= Charles Edward Long =

British antiquarian

Charles Edward Long (28 July 1796 – 25 September 1861), was an English genealogist and antiquary.

== Life ==
Born at Benham Park, Berkshire, he was the elder and only surviving son of Charles Beckford Long (d. 1836) of Langley Hall, Berkshire, and his wife, Frances Monro Tucker. He was the grandson of Edward Long, the historian of Jamaica, a cousin of Charles Long, 1st Baron Farnborough, and nephew of General Robert Ballard Long, his father's twin. Long was educated at Harrow School (1810 – 1814) and at Trinity College, Cambridge (1815 – 1819). He won the Chancellor's Gold Medal in July 1818 for English verse on the subject of imperial and papal Rome, and graduated BA in 1819 and MA in 1822.

Returning from a visit to Hamburg, Long died unmarried on 25 September 1861 at the Lord Warden Hotel, Dover. He was buried in the churchyard at Seale, Surrey.

== Works ==
Possessed of an ample fortune, Long's devotion to historical and genealogical studies were greatly facilitated by access to the College of Heralds granted him by the Deputy Earl Marshal, Lord Henry Thomas Molyneux Howard - his uncle by marriage. Long always maintained a personal and scholarly interest in Harrow and in 1849 assisted George Butler in his biographical notes of Harrow scholars. In 1860 he wrote for the Harrow Gazette an article on the life of John Lyon, the founder of the school. Descended from the Long family of Wiltshire, he also took a considerable interest in the history of that county: he was an earnest promoter of the Wiltshire Archaeological Society, and contributed to its magazine. He was for many years a frequent correspondent of the Gentleman's Magazine, and the leading antiquarian periodicals of his day. In 1845 with the assistance of the Garter King of Arms, Sir Charles George Young, Long compiled a volume called Royal descents: a genealogical list of the several persons entitled to quarter the arms of the royal houses of England In 1859 from the original manuscript in the British Museum, he edited for the Camden Society, the Diary of the Marches of the Royal Army during the Great Civil War, Kept by Richard Symonds. He presented his Genealogical collections of Jamaica families, to the British Museum. During 1857–9 he also gave to the museum many valuable documents relating to Jamaica, also preserved in the British Library are his letters to Joseph Hunter, extending from 1847 to 1859. Amongst many other of Long's publications, notable is his pamphlet of 1832 in which he defends the conduct of his uncle Robert Ballard Long during the campaign of 1811; and also his 1824 volume Considerations on the Game Laws, in which he offered an argument for regarding game as property, thereby allowing its sale to become a legal transaction.
