= William Williams (artist) =

English/American painter and writer (1727–1791)

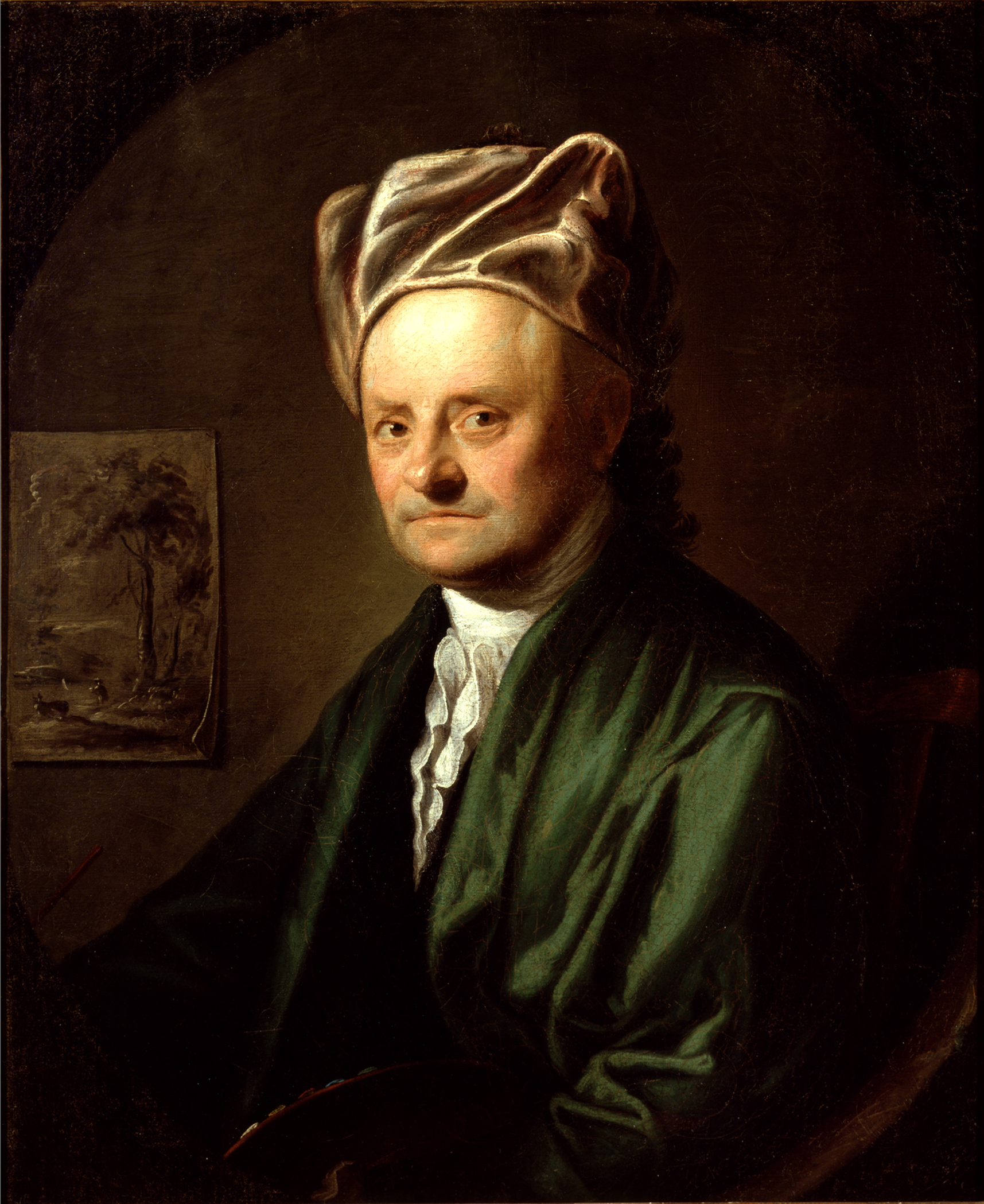
- Self-portrait
- Born: 1727
- Died: 27 April 1791
- Occupations: Painter, novelist

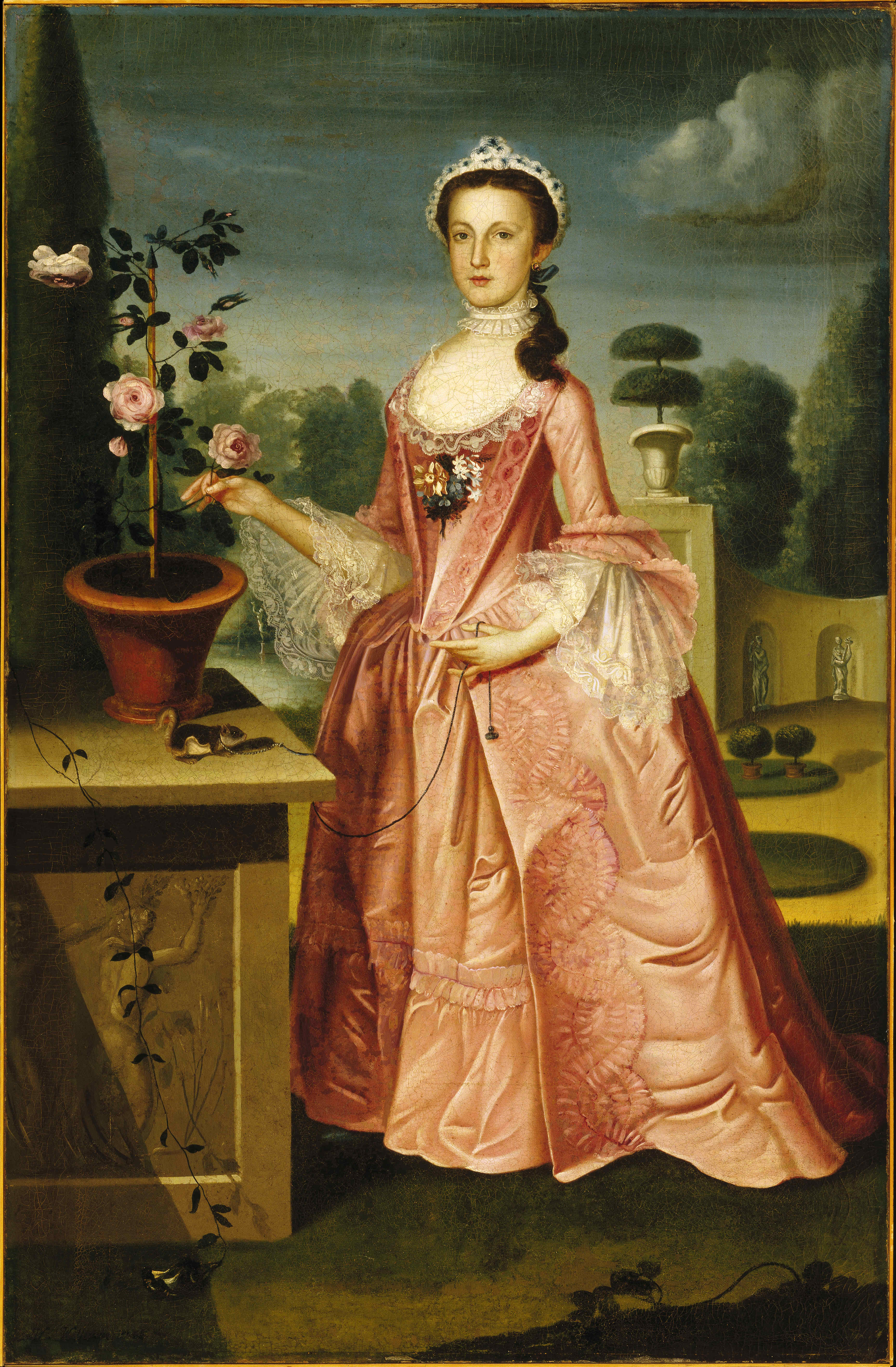
Deborah Hall, 1766, oil on canvas, in the Brooklyn Museum of Art

William Williams (1727 – 27 April 1791) was a British painter and writer who wrote the novel The Journal of Llewellin Penrose, Seaman, which is considered by some to be the first American novel.

== Early life ==
Williams was born in Bristol, England, but his family originated in Caerphilly, Wales.

== Seafaring and Penrose ==
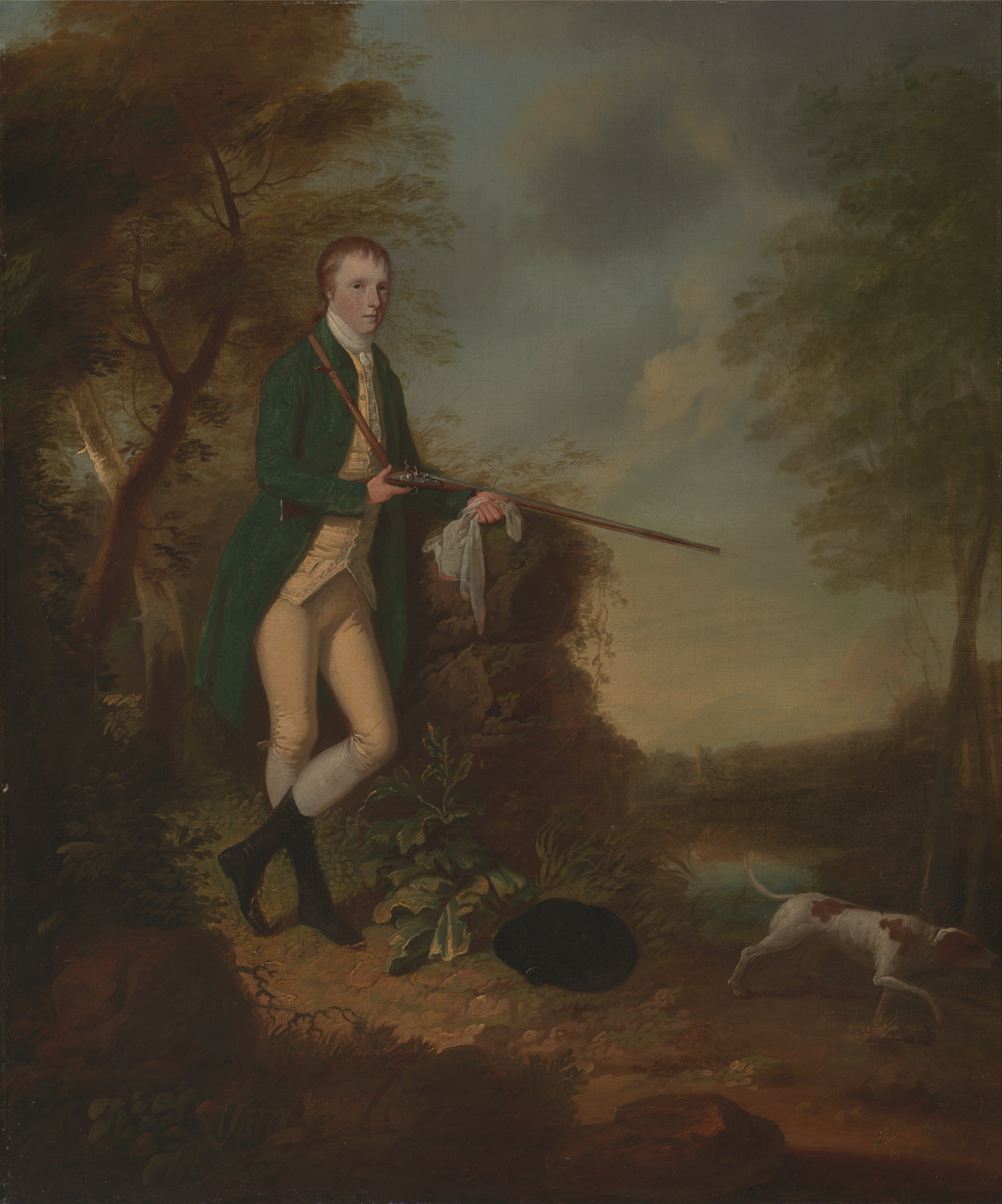
Hunting portrait of Gilbert McHutchin, 1780, oil on canvas, in the Yale Center for British Art

Williams is believed to have been a seafarer during the early part of his life. During that time he became a friend and shipmate of William Falconer. Williams wrote The Journal of Llewellin Penrose, Seaman, believed to be partly autobiographical, about a Welsh sailor who is cast away in the Americas. This book is accounted by many scholars as the first American novel. Williams could not find a publisher for the book, however, because its clearly fictional elements did not fit in with the then-current vogue for true travel tales. The novel was not published until 1815, and then only in a revised form. The original text was not published until 1969.

== Artistic career ==
He began living in Philadelphia around 1747 after his time at sea. In Philadelphia he was instrumental in building America's first theater, maintained an art studio at "The Sign of Hogarth's Head," and taught art to a young Benjamin West, among others. West later credited Williams for piquing his interest in painting. Particularly of note to recent historians are three portraits tentatively attributed to him at the beginning of his career: the Mohawk chief Theyanoguin in 1755, the radical abolitionist vegetarian Benjamin Lay around 1758, and the Black astronomer Francis Williams around 1760.

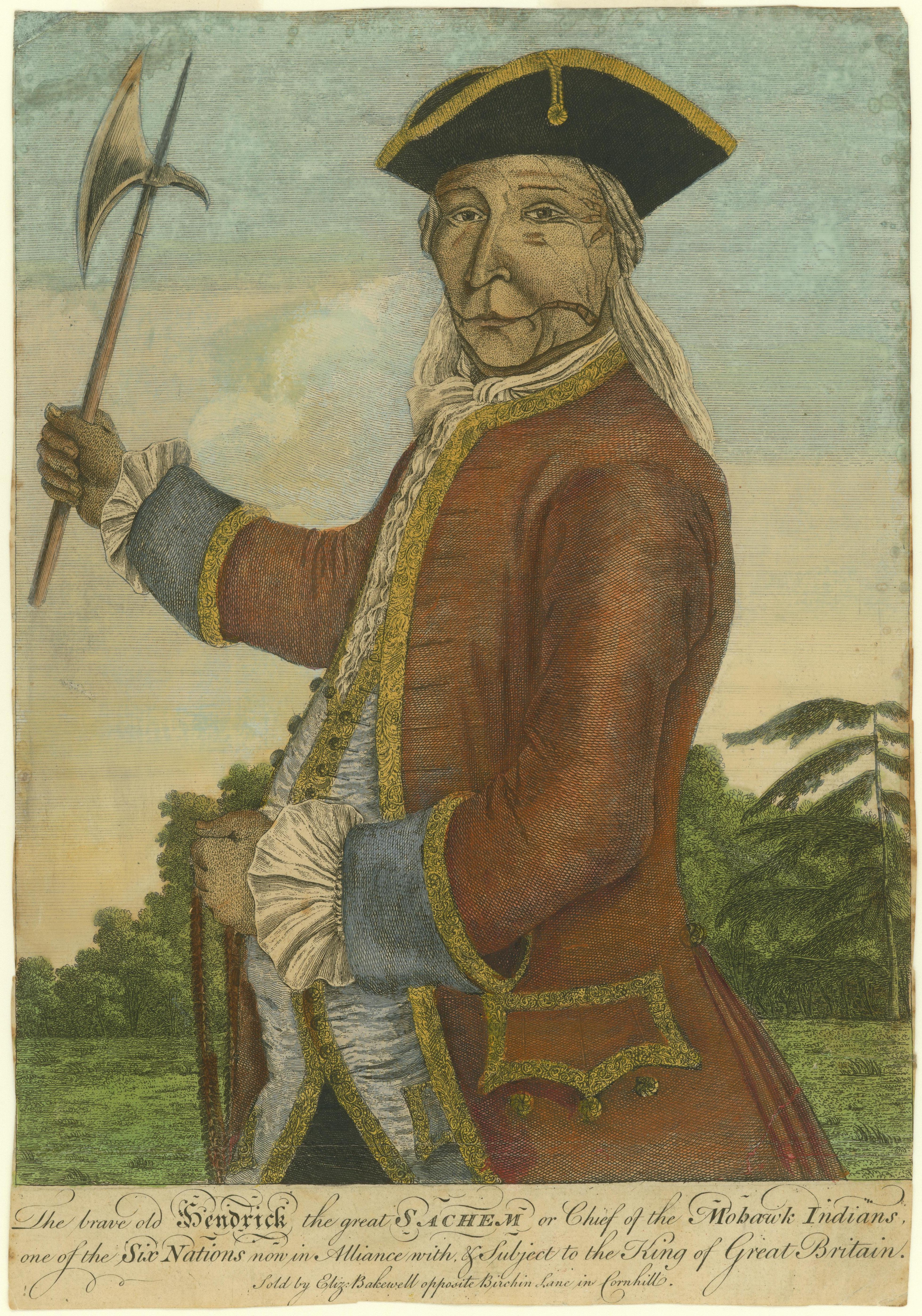
Engraving of Theyanoguin, copy of a lost painting believed to be by Williams

Williams' portrait of the radical Quaker Benjamin Lay

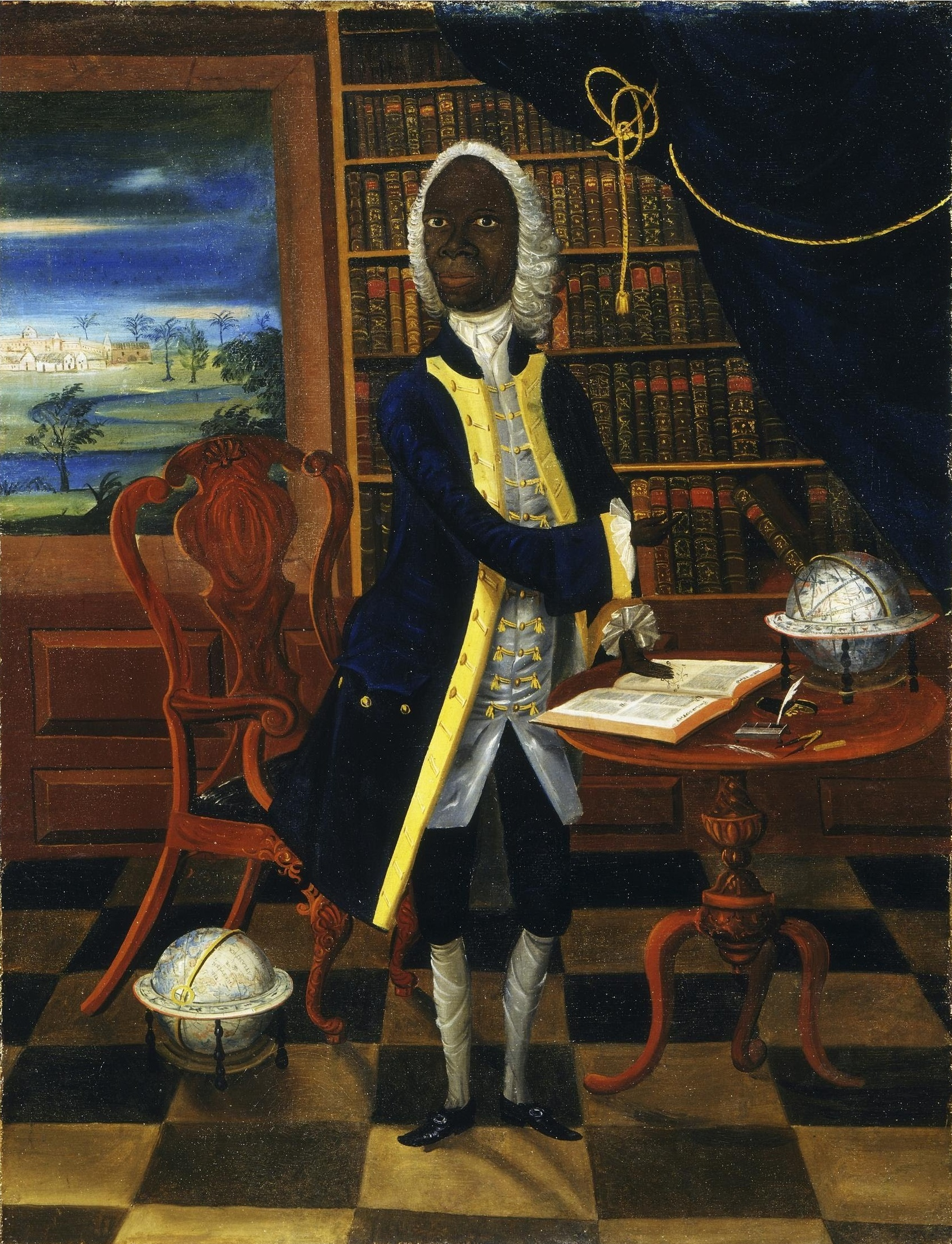
Portrait of Francis Williams with Halley's Comet. The painting resembles the Lay portrait in composition.

Williams associated with Benjamin Franklin, Franklin's business partner David Hall, patriot and intellectual Benjamin Lay, and William and Lewis Hallam. Traveling with the Hallam Company he lived for a time in Jamaica, where he possibly painted Francis Williams, and afterwards in New York City, where he was married to Mary Mare, the sister of artist John Mare Jr.

Williams returned to England in 1776, where he lived in London for some time and renewed his friendship with Benjamin West. He subsequently returned to Bristol where he painted for several years before falling on hard times. He died in the Merchants' and Sailors' Almshouse in Bristol in 1791.

== Legacy ==
Williams left his personal property to Thomas Eagles, a gentleman who helped him gain admission to the almshouse, where he lived until his death. The bequest included many books, a self-portrait (now in the collections of the Winterthur Museum, Garden and Library), and the manuscript of Penrose. The Rev. John Eagles, son of Thomas, prepared an edited copy of this for publication, including 37 watercolours mainly by Nicholas Pocock, intended for engraving. This Eagles version appeared in 1815, but without the illustrations, and in 2006 its manuscript was acquired by the National Maritime Museum, Greenwich, UK. Williams' original manuscript, bequeathed to Eagles senior, is at the Indiana University Bloomington. The manuscript was transcribed and published in 1969 by David Howard Dickason.

== Descendants ==
William and Mary had one son, William Joseph Williams, born in New York City in 1759. William Joseph Williams became a painter as well, and is considered the first American portraitist.

== See also ==
- Robinson Crusoe
