= Charles Catton =

British artist (1728–1798)

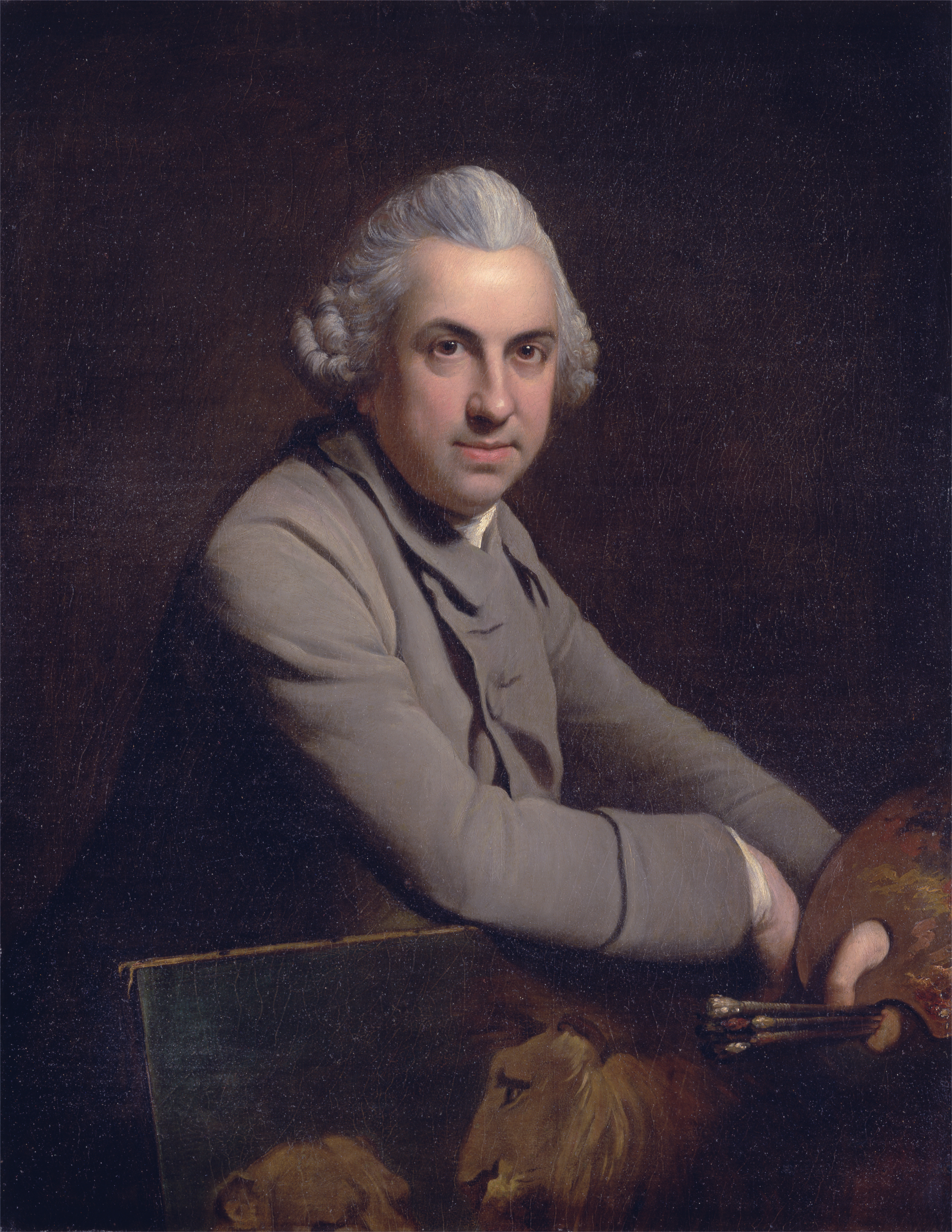
- Self-portrait (1769)
- Born: 1728; Norwich, Norfolk, England
- Died: 28 August 1798; New Road, London, England
- Known for: Oil painting, Landscape painting
- Movement: founding member of the Royal Academy

Charles Catton RA (1728 in Norwich – 28 August 1798, in London), sometimes referred to as Charles Catton the elder, was an English coach painter, landscape, animal and figure painter of the late 18th century, and one of the founder members of the Royal Academy of Arts.

== Life and work ==
Catton was born in Norwich, Norfolk, in 1728, and said to be one of 35 children that his father had from his two marriages. He was apprenticed to a London coach painter, or, according to some sources, a carpenter by the name of Maxwell, and studied drawing at the St. Martin's Lane Academy. He was mainly known as a landscape and animal painter, but also had a good knowledge of the figure, and a talent for humorous design. In 1781, he published an etching called The Margate Packet.

He became a member of the Society of Artists, and exhibited various pictures in its galleries in 1760–1764. He was outstanding as a coach painter, producing ornamental panels for carriages, floral embellishments, and heraldic devices to the highest quality, eventually becoming coach-painter to King George III.

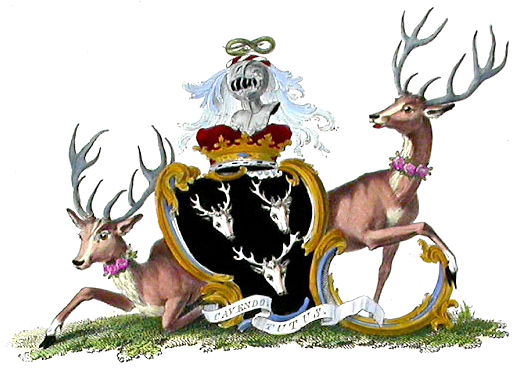
Duke of Devonshire arms

He was a founding member of the Royal Academy, and, in 1784, was master of the Worshipful Company of Painter-Stainers. He exhibited at the Academy from its foundation until the year of his death. The works he showed were usually landscapes, but occasionally subject and animal paintings, his last exhibits there being Jupiter and Leda and Child at play. He painted an altarpiece, The Angel delivering St. Peter, for the church of St Peter Mancroft in Norwich.

He retired from painting some years before his death. He died at his house in Judd Place, New Road, London, on 28 August 1798, and was buried in Bloomsbury cemetery.

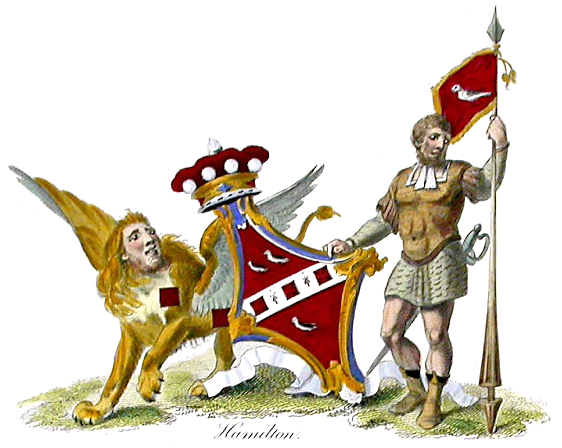
Arms of the Baroness Hamilton of Hameldon, 1790

His son, Charles Catton the younger (1756–1819), who was listed in Royal Academy catalogues as living at his father's house in Gate Street, gained a reputation as a scene-painter and topographical draughtsman. He emigrated to the United States. Among Catton's pupils were John Durand, his own son Charles Catton the younger, his own brother James and William Owen, who became a member of the Royal Academy himself.
