= Edward Long (historian) =

British judge and historian (1734–1813)

- Born: August 23, 1734; St. Blazey, Cornwall, England
- Died: March 13, 1813 (aged 78); Arundel Park, Sussex, England
- Occupations: Judge, historian
- Notable work: History of Jamaica (1774)

Edward Long (23 August 1734 – 13 March 1813) was a British judge and historian best known for writing a book about the history of Jamaica in 1774 that was heavily rooted in proslavery thought.

== Life and career ==
Long was the fourth son of Samuel Long (1700–1757) of Longville, Jamaica, son of Charles Long MP, and his wife Mary Tate, born 23 August 1734 at St. Blazey, in Cornwall. His great-grandfather, Samuel Long, had arrived on the island in 1655 as a lieutenant in the English army of conquest, and the family established itself as part of the island's governing planter elite. His sister, Catherine Maria Long, married Sir Henry Moore, 1st Baronet (Governor of Jamaica), and Long, in Jamaica from 1757, became his private secretary.

In 1752, Long became a law student at Gray's Inn, and from 1757 until 1769 he was resident in Jamaica. During this period he explored inside the Riverhead Cave, the Runaway Bay Caves and the Green Grotto. He was judge in the local vice admiralty court, and briefly Speaker of the Assembly, elected 13 September 1768. Long moved permanently to England, in 1769, for health reasons. Long died in 1813. He was a polygenist who claimed that the White race was a different species to the Black race.

== History of Jamaica ==
History of Jamaica book cover

Long's History of Jamaica, first published in 1774 in three volumes but again in the 1970s, was his well-known work. This book gives a political, social, and economic account with a survey of the island, parish by parish from 1665 to 1774. It is a comprehensive book, yet it contains some of the most virulent descriptions of Jamaicans and Africans in general. The book contains a racist description of American black slaves during the Age of Enlightenment. In a similar fashion to his contemporaries, Long's description of race discussed it as a "natural state" compared to the Romantic period.

Long, in his rather shocking descriptions argues that American "Negroes" were characterised by the same "bestial manners, stupidity and vices which debase their brethren" in Africa. He maintained that "this race of people" is distinguishable from the rest of mankind in that they embody "every species of inherent turpitude" and imperfection that can be found dispersed among all other races of men. Unlike the most "abandoned villain" to be found in civilisation, argues Long, these peoples have no redeeming qualities whatsoever. Racist views were widespread among European writers at the time, some of whom used to write detailed descriptions of Africans and Africa based only on accounts of missionaries and plantation owners. Long echoes David Hume and Immanuel Kant in his deeply racist descriptions of Africans and claims to find it astonishing that despite being subject to colonisation for a long time, the "Negroes" have failed to demonstrate any appreciation for the arts or any inventive ability. He observes that throughout the entirety of Africa, there are few natives who "comprehend anything of mechanic arts or manufacture", and those who do, perform their work in the manner of some under-evolved ape. This is due to them being "void of genius". However, his views, even for his time, were extreme. The book also contains descriptions of interracial marriage. In the book he included a poem by Francis Williams, which he then proceeds to criticise in an attempt to justify his theory of white racial superiority.

== Family ==
In 1758, Long married Mary Ballard (d. 1797), daughter and heir of Thomas Beckford who was the brother of Peter Beckford the younger, and widow of John Palmer of "Springvale" in Jamaica. They had three sons and three daughters:

- Edward Beeston, who married Mary, daughter of John Thomlinson M.P.
- Jane Catherine (d. 1825), who married Richard Dawkins, son of Henry Dawkins M.P. of Standlynch
- Charlotte, who in 1791 married Sir George Pocock, 1st Baronet M.P.
- Elizabeth, who in 1801 married Henry Molyneux-Howard M.P.

After the birth of their fourth child in 1769, the family returned to England. Twin sons were born in 1771 at Chichester:

- the elder, Robert Ballard, and
- Charles Beckford, who married Frances Monro Tucker. Charles Edward Long was their son.

Edward Long died at Arundel Park, Sussex, the seat of his son-in-law Henry.
