= Robert Ballard Long =

Lieutenant-General Robert Ballard Long
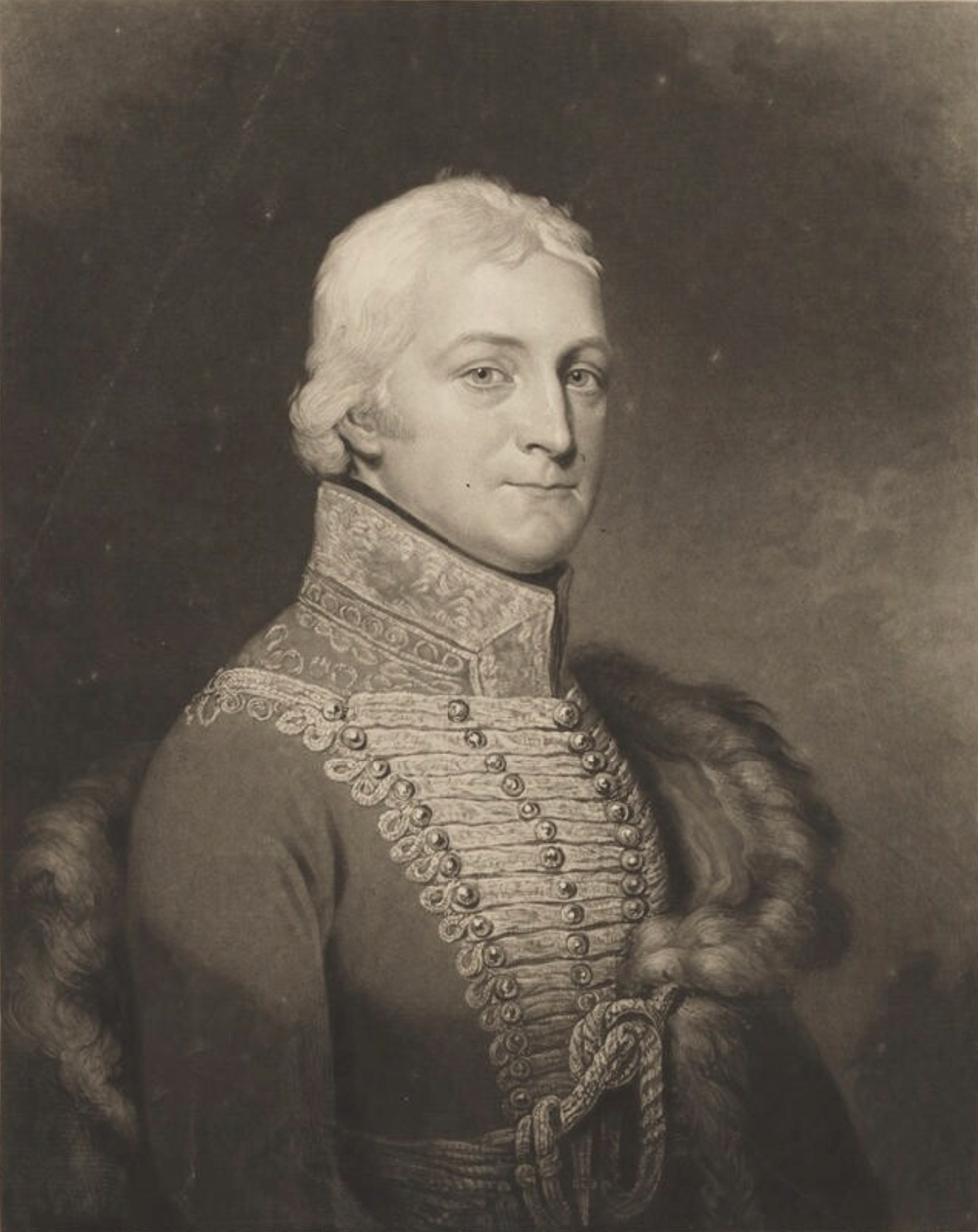
- Engraving by Charles Turner after a William Fowler portrait, 1827
- Born: 4 April 1771; Chichester, West Sussex
- Died: 2 March 1825 (aged 53); Berkeley Square, London
- Military career
- Allegiance: Great Britain; Hanover; United Kingdom
- Branch: British Army; Hanoverian Army
- Service years: 1791–1821
- Rank: Lieutenant-general (British Army)
- Unit: 1st King's Dragoon Guards
- Conflicts: French Revolutionary Wars; Flanders campaign; Irish Rebellion of 1798; Napoleonic Wars; Battle of Corunna; Walcheren Campaign; Battle of Campo Maior; Battle of Albuera; Battle of Arroyo dos Molinos; Battle of Vitoria; Battle of Pyrenees; Siege of Pamplona (1813)

Lieutenant-General Robert Ballard Long (4 April 1771 – 2 March 1825) was a British army officer who served in the French Revolutionary and Napoleonic Wars. Serving in the British and Hanoverian armies, despite seeing extensive military service he never managed to achieve high command due to Long's abrasive manner with his superiors and alleged tactical ineptitude. Although he served as a cavalry commander in the Peninsular War between 1811 and 1813, Long was eventually replaced Colquhoun Grant, which ended Long's active military career.

== Early life ==
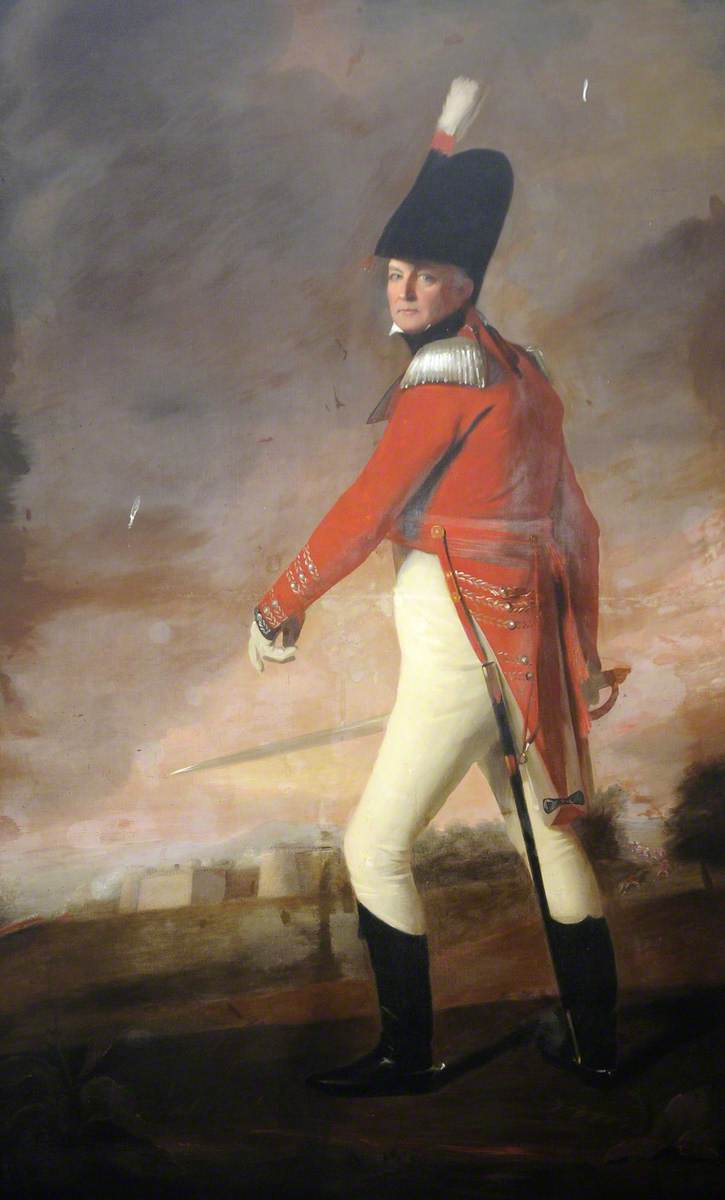
Sir George Don, whom Long served under in the Flanders campaign

Robert Ballard Long was born on 4 April 1771 in Chichester, West Sussex, one of twin sons, the other being named Charles, born to the British historian Edward Long and his wife Mary. Long received a formal education, attending Harrow School, which he left in 1789. Following three years of studying military theory at the University of Göttingen, Long was commissioned into the British Army's 1st King's Dragoon Guards at the rank of cornet on 4 May 1791. Aided by his family's wealth, Long was promoted to lieutenant on 25 February 1793 captain in November of that year. In June 1794, he was sent with his regiment to the Low Countries and fought in the Flanders campaign. By the winter of 1794, Long had left his regiment and was attached to the staff of General Sir George Don during the British retreat into Germany and return to England.

Following his arrival in England, Long served as an aide-de-camp to General Sir William Augustus Pitt, who commanded the shore defences at Portsmouth. A friendship developed between the two men, which would serve Long well in his future career. In mid-1796, Long was transferred to the Hanoverian Army, first as an officer in the York Rangers and then as a lieutenant colonel in the Hompesch Mounted Riflemen with a commission he purchased from Baron Hompesch himself for £2,000. His regiment was amongst those dispatched under Sir John Moore to suppress the Irish Rebellion of 1798, with Long serving in the town of Wexford.

Following the suppression of the rebellion, Long was transferred to the York Hussars, another Hanoverian cavalry unit, at Weymouth, Dorset, serving in the unit until the 1802 Peace of Amiens. Long spent the peace studying at the Senior Division of the new Royal Military College at High Wycombe, where he became friends with its lieutenant-governor John Le Marchant, and at the return of war joined the 16th Light Dragoons as a lieutenant colonel, transferring to the 15th Light Dragoons in 1805 under the Duke of Cumberland. It was with this regiment that Long caused the first of his many upsets, almost immediately falling out with his superior officer. The situation deteriorated so much that the two both attempted to command the regiment without consulting each other, resulting in years of arguments and hostility between the two. Part of the friction was due to Long's objection to Cumberland's penchant for excessive corporal punishments, such as 'picketing.'

Long was with the regiment for two years during which time it was remodelled as a hussar formation. Eventually the name too changed, becoming the 15th 'King's' Light Dragoons (Hussars). Long is mentioned frequently in the anonymously authored book "Jottings from my Sabretasch." The author, a troop sergeant of the 15th Light Dragoons, looked upon Long as a peerless commander. He ascribed virtually all of the superiorities of organisation or training that he claimed for his regiment, over the rest of the British cavalry, to Long's initiatives when in command.

== Peninsular War ==
In 1808 with the dispatch of Sir John Moore's army to Spain, Long again applied for a position and was welcomed by his former commander, who by the time of Long's arrival was preparing to fight the desperate rearguard action of the Battle of Corunna amid the ruins of his campaign. Long did not have a command during the battle but instead served on his commander's staff, presumably being present at Moore's death. Returning to England, Long was soon recruited for Lord Chatham's disastrous Walcheren Expedition as adjutant-general. The campaign was an abject failure due to reconnaissance and supply failures, heavy rain, strong French resistance and a devastating epidemic of what was called at the time "ague," almost certainly malaria, which killed a large proportion of the men garrisoning the town of Flushing (Vlissingen).

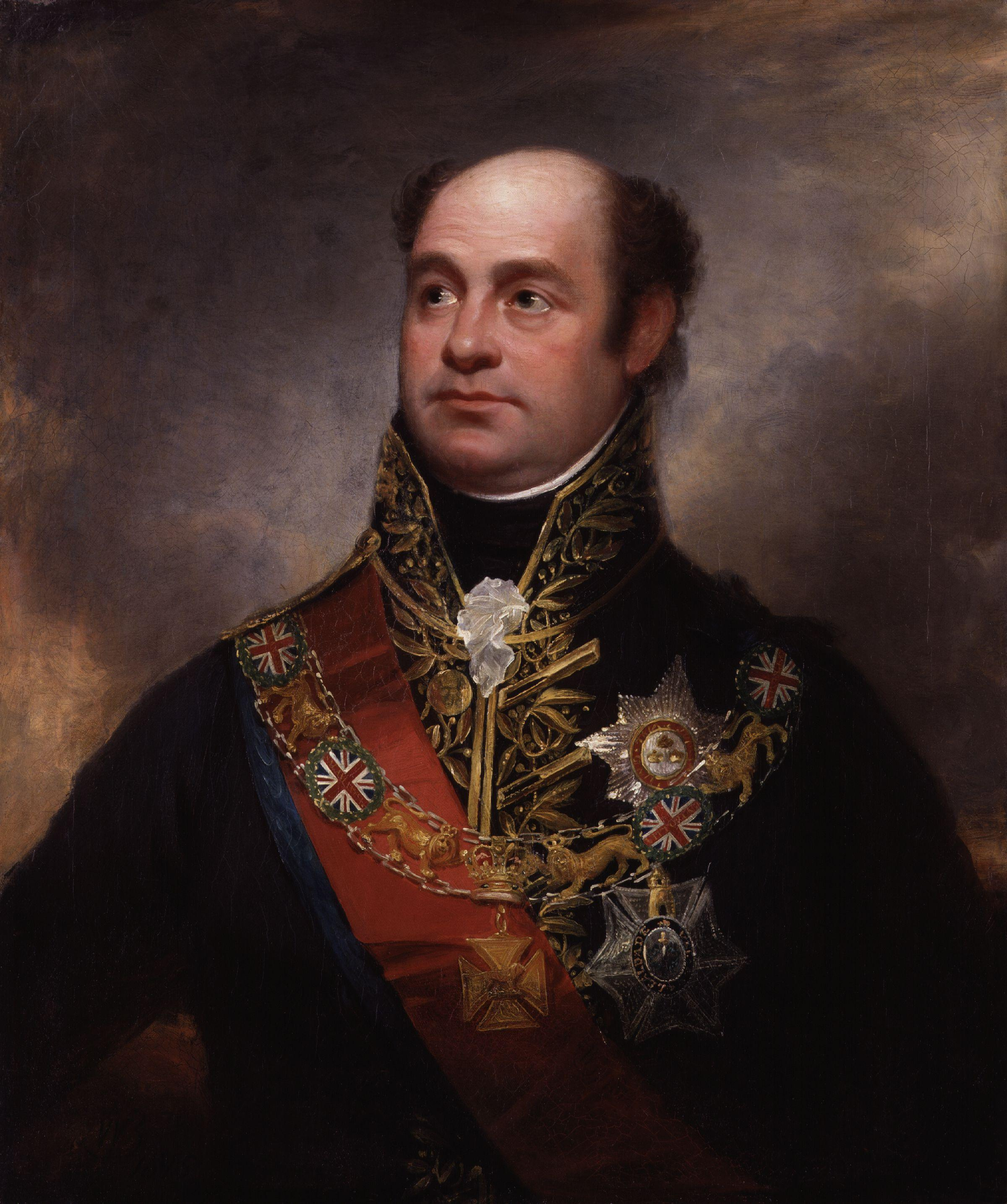
Portrait of Lord Beresford by William Beechey, 1815.

In 1810 Long returned to active service joining Wellington's army in the Peninsula. He took command of the cavalry (one British brigade, one Portuguese brigade and an unbrigaded British regiment) of the army of Sir William Beresford during the operations surrounding the first Allied siege of Badajoz. Long took command of the cavalry on 21 March 1811, a mere four days before they were to see action. The cavalry clash at Campo Mayor on 25 March 1811, was to become a very controversial action. Beresford considered that Long had lost control of his light cavalry, which had pursued fleeing French cavalry for up to 7 miles (11 km) until they came within range of the fortress guns of Badajoz. The historian Charles Oman later sided with Beresford in calling the Campo Mayor action reckless, though without naming Long. Beresford also claimed that his taking personal command of the heavy dragoons had prevented Long from ordering them to attempt a suicidal charge against French infantry squares.

However, the army as a whole felt differently and sided with the 13th Light Dragoons who had pursued the French. The pursuit took place after the 13th had made an epic charge causing no less than six enemy squadrons to rout, having only two and a half squadrons themselves. In contrast to Oman's opinion, the historian Sir John Fortescue wrote, "Of the performance of Thirteenth, who did not exceed two hundred men, in defeating twice or thrice their numbers single-handed, it is difficult to speak too highly." Long was of the opinion, and was subsequently supported in this by the historian Sir William Napier, that if Beresford had released the British brigade of heavy dragoons he would have been able to force the whole French column to surrender. This was the start of the abrasive and acrimonious relationship between Beresford and Long. At the subsequent clash at Los Santos (16 April 1811) Long managed to retain the heavy dragoons under his command and inflicted a reverse on the French cavalry, the French 2nd Hussars suffering considerable losses. On two subsequent occasions, Long was ordered to withdraw from action without engaging whilst still delaying the French through manoeuvre, though Long maintained that he was given orders merely to fall back to a certain position, with no mention being made about delaying the French advance. On each occasion Long withdrew too quickly and gave the French time to respond, apparent failures which frustrated Beresford enough to take advantage of Long's junior rank in relation to allied Spanish cavalry generals to relieve Long of his command, on the day of the Battle of Albuera, and replace him with the more senior general William Lumley. Long subsequently took an honourable part in the battle, though under Lumley's command. Long also served under Lumley at the Battle of Usagre on 25 May 1811, when the British cavalry neatly trapped two regiments of French dragoons at a bridge, inflicting severe casualties.

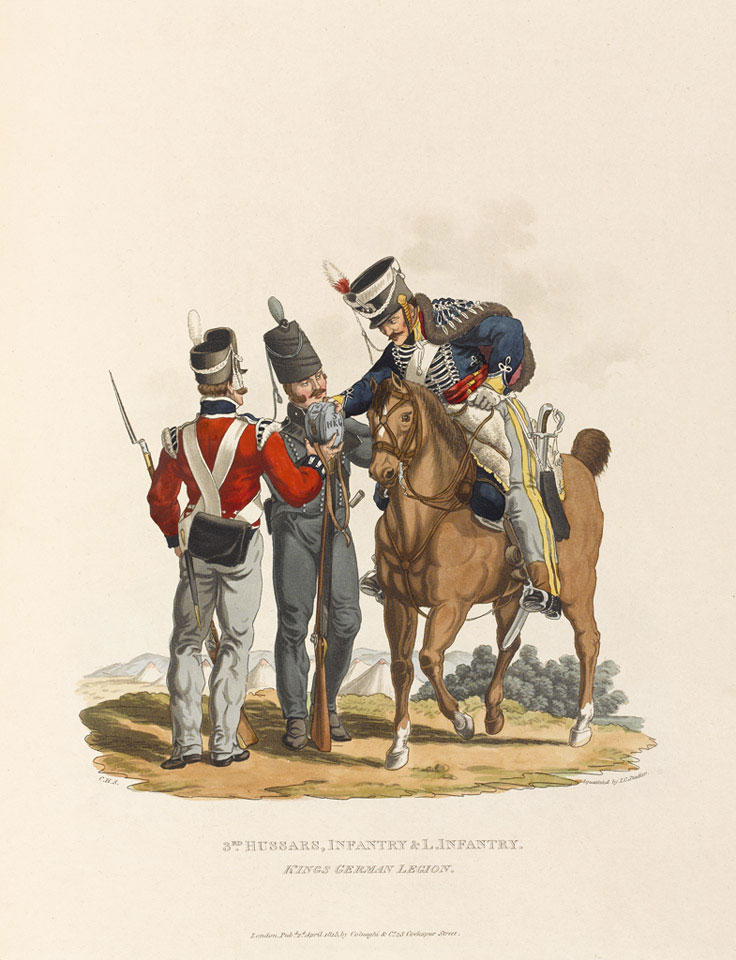
The right-hand figure is a KGL hussar, Long commanded KGL hussars at Elvas and, with greater success, Arroyo dos Molinos

Long was given command of a light cavalry brigade in June 1811, following his promotion to major general, these troops were involved in a skirmish near Elvas, where a picket of around fifty men of the 11th Light Dragoons was captured (only one man escaped). Wellington was present on this occasion and gave Long a strongly worded reprimand which effectively stalemated his career. Long's political friends were, however, too strong at this stage to allow his recall from active service and therefore Long maintained his brigade command. He commanded the cavalry under Sir Rowland Hill at Arroyo dos Molinos, where a whole French infantry division and several regiments of cavalry were trapped and destroyed as fighting units. Long's cavalry charged and broke the French cavalry and captured over 200 of them plus three pieces of artillery (General Bron, commanding the French cavalry, and the Prince of Aremberg, commander of the 27th Chasseurs, were also captured).

Long commanded a brigade (consisting of a single regiment - the 13th Light Dragoons) at the Battle of Vitoria in 1813. He fought at the Battle of the Pyrenees later in the same year. When Marshal Soult's large-scale attack across the Pyrenees was launched, on 25 July 1813, it caught Wellington's forces off guard and in an extended state. Long's brigade was acting as the vital link between the two main bodies of Anglo-allied troops. It was in this situation that Long performed the most important service in his active military career. General Lowry Cole sent a dispatch to Wellington to say that a French army of about 35,000 men had forced him from his defensive position and that he was falling back. The dispatch came into Long's hands and he, upon his own initiative, opened it and made a copy to be sent to his immediate superior Sir Rowland Hill. Hill then forwarded the dispatch to Wellington who had recently moved his headquarters. The original copy of the dispatch went to the location Wellington's previous headquarters and did not reach him that evening. Long's intelligent actions allowed Wellington time to react to Soult's movements; had any appreciable delay occurred before Wellington became apprised of the situation the results could have been disastrous for the allied army.

== The end of active service ==
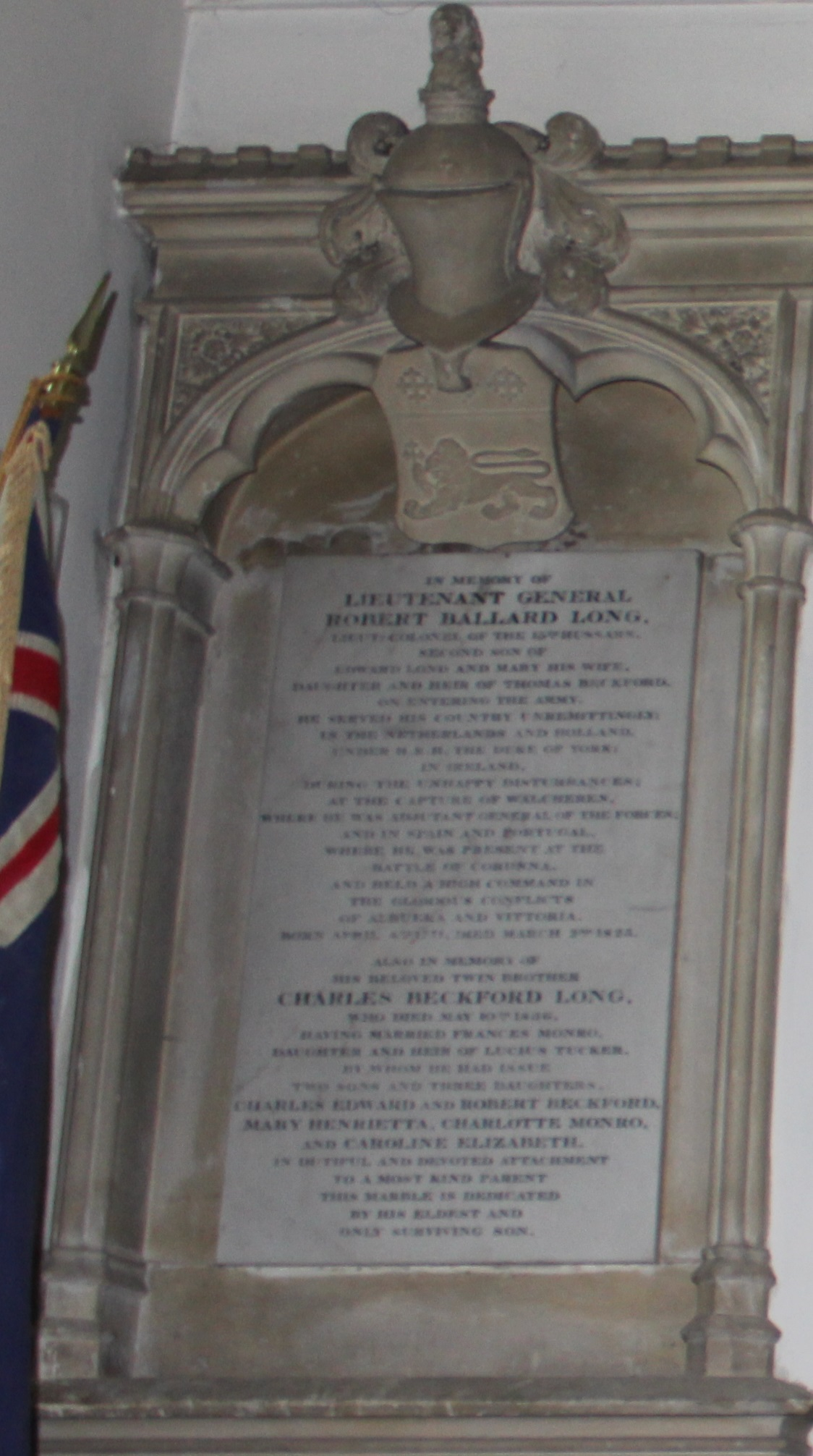
Memorial in St Laurence Church, Seale

Long's final action was in the Siege of Pamplona, after which he was recalled by the Duke of York to England with Wellington's agreement. Long corresponded with Wellington, who assured him that Long's recall was not at his request. Long strongly suspected that the Prince Regent had engineered his recall to vacate the command of his brigade so that Colquhoun Grant (commonly known as "The Black Giant"), the Prince's favourite, could be made its commander. Grant was also an intimate of the Duke of Cumberland which must have caused Long further displeasure. Long refused the proffered posting as a divisional commander in Scotland and scornfully retired to his home at Barnes Terrace, Surrey.

As an officer on the general list, Long was promoted in retirement; he was promoted to lieutenant general in 1821. Royal recognition was not forthcoming however after his public feuds with two royal princes, and Long was not knighted or offered a title, unlike many of his contemporaries. He died childless in 1825 at his London house in Berkeley Square and was buried in the family crypt at Seale, Surrey.

== Legacy ==
After Long's death, his nephew Charles Edward Long, a notable scholar and historian, wrote several pamphlets defending his uncle's reputation and attacking his enemies, especially Beresford; exchanges of pamphlets and letters between Charles Long and his uncle's opponents continued through the 1830s.

Robert Long was a conscientious and brave officer, whose reputation suffered as a result of certain character flaws. If his record as a cavalry general was chequered he, nevertheless, contributed substantially to a number of victories, including Los Santos, Usagre and Arroyo dos Molinos. It is to be regretted that he is chiefly remembered for the long-running acrimony generated by the action at Campo Mayor.

To his subordinates he appears to have been a popular and respected figure; characteristically he refused to allow Wellington's censure of the 13th Light Dragoons, following Campo Mayor, to be entered in the regiment's official record. From the rank-and-file he gained the affectionate appellation "Bobby Long." The officers and men of the 13th Light Dragoons repaid his regard for them when they voluntarily subscribed to the purchase of a set of silver plate for Long when he was replaced in command of his brigade.

Unfortunately, Long could not, it seems, avoid entering into vituperative conflicts with his superiors. When the men he made personal enemies of included royal princes (both later to become kings) and a field marshal (albeit in the Portuguese service) Long's career and reputation were bound to be adversely affected. An example of the less attractive side of Long's character is the manner in which he operated a campaign of irritation against Beresford after Campo Mayor. Long harassed Beresford by requesting clarification, to the minutest degree, of virtually every order he was given. Long did not seem to recognise that there were conflicts he had no hope of winning. Beresford was the superior officer with all the advantage of power within the relationship. Long's campaign backfired badly when Beresford, as soon as opportunity allowed, replaced him as the commander of the cavalry.

The British historian and Peninsular War veteran, Sir William Napier, was a severe critic of Beresford's record as army commander during the Albuera Campaign; in criticising Beresford he involved Long's opinions as part of his argument. The publication of Napier's history led to a long running and acrimonious argument in print between Beresford and his partisans on one side, with Napier and Long's nephew Charles Long (Long having died before the controversy reached the public arena) on the other. Recently, Long's performance as a cavalry general has received more favourable comment in Ian Fletcher's revisionist account of the British cavalry in the Napoleonic period. Long was a regular letter writer, particularly to his twin brother Charles. The lively letters he wrote whilst on campaign in the Peninsular War were collected, edited and published in 1951. They provide a valuable insight into the workings of Wellington's army, particularly the cavalry.
