= Lawrence Kilburn =

American painter

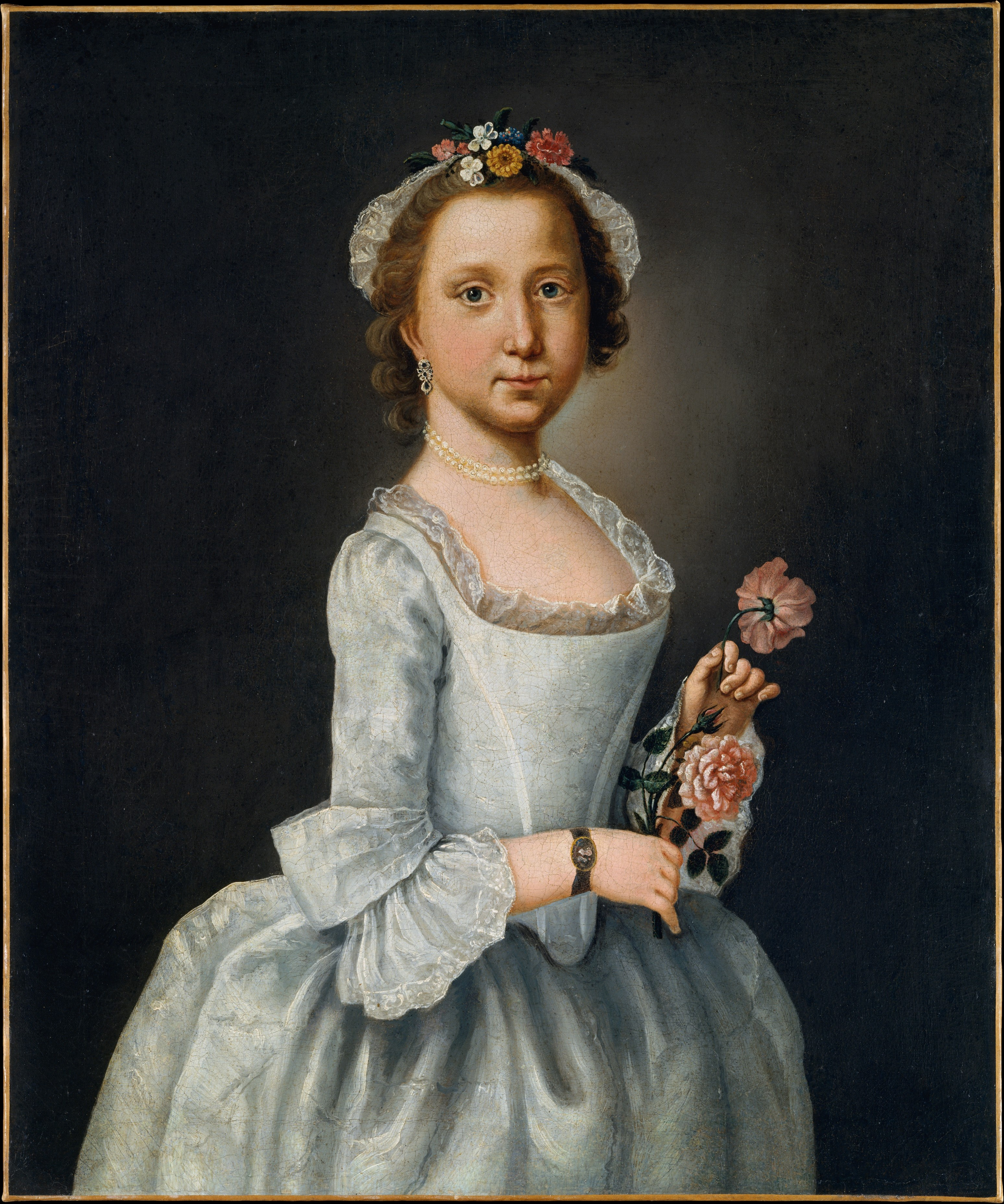
Portrait of a Lady (1764), oil on canvas, in the Metropolitan Museum of Art

Lawrence Kilburn (sometimes Kilbrunn or Kilbourn) (1720–1775) was a painter active in the colony of New York. He was for nearly twenty years the portraitist of choice in New York City, and is said to have been the first portraitist in the city.

Kilburn is said by at least one source to have been a Moravian of Danish birth. He arrived in New York from London in May, 1754, on the brig Maria captained by Thomas Miller, and immediately announced his presence in the New York Gazette and the New York Weekly. His first advertisement, which ran on May 13, 1754, read:

Lawrence Kilburn, Limner, just arrived from London with Capt. Miller, hereby acquaints all Gentlemen and Ladies inclined to favour him in having their Pictures drawn, that he don't doubt of pleasing them in taking a true Likeness, and finishing the Drapery in a proper Manner, as also in the Choice of Attitudes, suitable to each Person's Age and Sex, and giving agreeable Satisfaction, as he has heretofore done to Gentlemen and Ladies in London. He may at present be apply'd to at his Lodgings, at Mr. Bogart's, near the New Printing-Office in Beaver-Street.

He would go on to move numerous times while he lived in the city, and at the time of his death was keeping a paint store at the White Hall.

The nature of Kilbrun's training is unknown, although it has been speculated that, due to his somewhat limited understanding of human anatomy and his abilities as a painter of clothing, he had worked as a drapery painter prior to emigration. He placed six advertisements in the local press between 1754 and 1775; this was more than any other colonial artist. As with many colonial painters, he offered many services; he invited commissions, offered drawing instruction, and sold painting supplies, and he is known to have done decorative painting at least once. He also identified himself in advertising as a painter of portrait miniatures. He chafed sometimes at the reluctance of his audience; in 1765, prior to leaving the city for a time, he reminded them that "As at present there is no other Portrait painter in the city but himself; whoever inclines to have anything done of that kind, are desired to apply in time, as it may be long before they have another opportunity."

Kilburn received a license to marry on June 24, 1761; his wife's name was Judith Eyraud or Ayraud. He was one of at least ten painters working in New York during the 1760s, and by 1766 found himself competing with various others for custom. Abraham Delanoy, newly returned from studying in London with Benjamin West, was one; John Mare was another, as were John Durand and Cosmo Alexander. Earlier patrons began to abandon him at this point, and it appears from newspaper advertisements that he turned exclusively to mercantile pursuits during the last years of his life. He was dead by September 21, 1775, when an advertisement in Rivington's N. Y. Gazetteer invited patrons to settle their accounts with his widow and executrix. Kilburn's handwritten memoir is preserved at the Moravian Archives, Bethlehem, appearing in the diary of First Moravian Church of New York, where he was a regular church member. After Laurence's death, Judith moved to Bethlehem, Pennsylvania, and her handwritten memoir is likewise preserved among the records of the Moravian Church in Bethlehem.

Kilburn favored a sober palette. Few of his pictures are signed or dated. The New York Historical Society holds a number of examples of his work, including several portraits of members of the Beekman family and one of Gerardus Stuydevant which was shown at the Centennial Exposition of 1876. Another portrait is owned by the Metropolitan Museum of Art. A portrait of Samuel Johnson, first president of Columbia University, is owned by the Century Club, to which it was donated by the artist himself sometime before 1757.
