= Battle of Campo Maior =

1811 battle during the Peninsular War

- Part of the Peninsular War
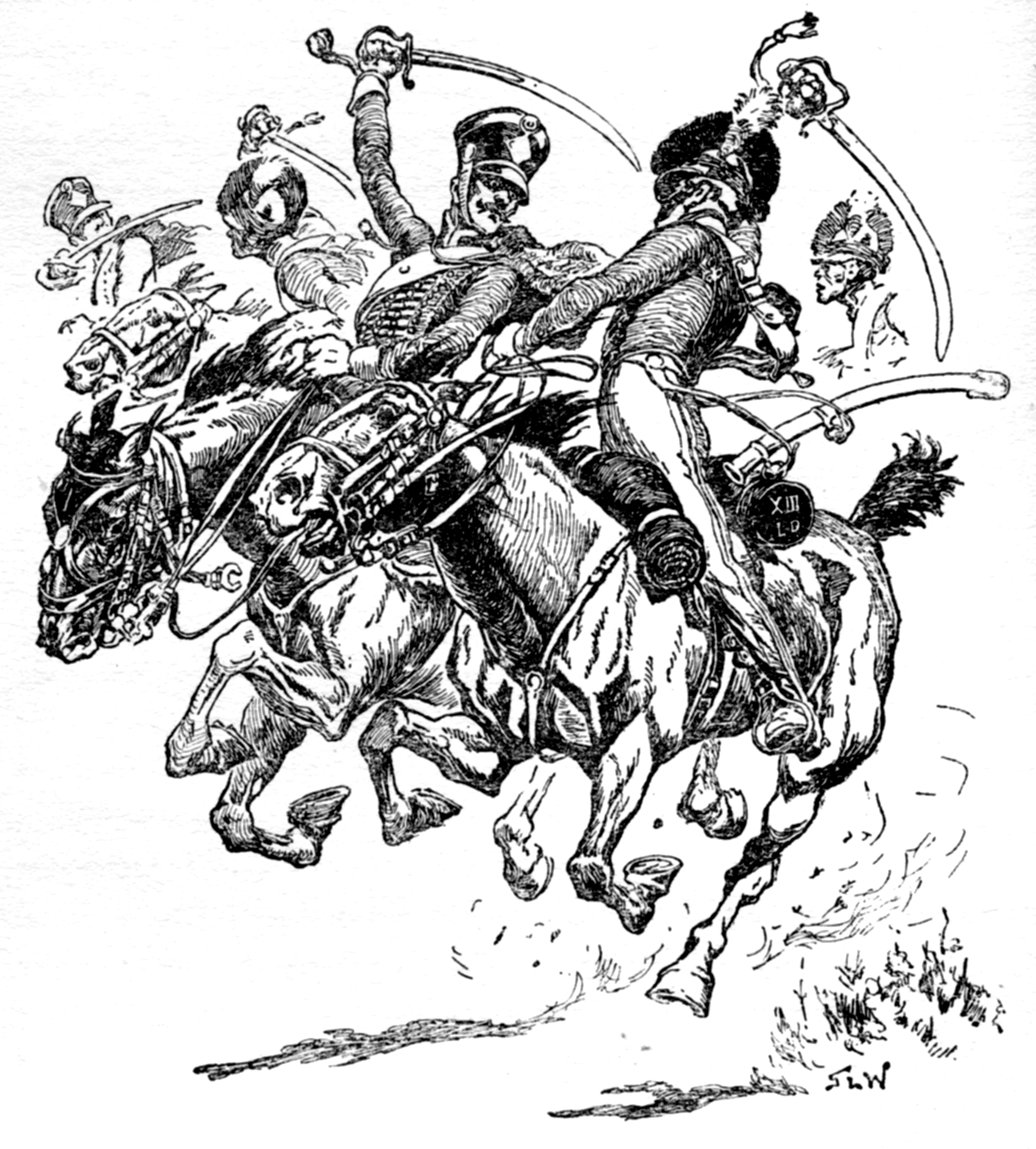
- The 13th Light Dragoons pursued the beaten French cavalry at Campo Maior, 25 March 1811, by Stanley L. Wood
Date	25 March 1811
Location	Campo Maior, Portugal 39°00′N 7°03′W
Result	Coalition victory

Belligerents
(First French Empire) French Empire	(United Kingdom of Great Britain and Ireland) United Kingdom; Portugal

Commanders and leaders
(First French Empire) Victor de Faÿ	(United Kingdom of Great Britain and Ireland) (Portugal) William Beresford (United Kingdom of Great Britain and Ireland) (Portugal) Robert Long

Strength
2,400	700

Casualties and losses
200 killed, wounded or captured 1 gun lost	168 killed, wounded or captured

Peninsular War
Castile 1811–13
current battle

In the Battle of Campo Maior, or Campo Mayor (an older spelling most often used in English language accounts), on 25 March 1811, Brigadier General Robert Ballard Long with a force of Anglo-Portuguese cavalry, the advance-guard of the army commanded by William Beresford, clashed with a French force commanded by General of Division Marie Victor de Fay, marquis de Latour-Maubourg that was escorting a convoy of siege cannon. Initially successful, some of the Allied horsemen indulged in a reckless pursuit of the French. An erroneous report was given that they had been captured wholesale. In consequence, Beresford halted his forces and the French were able to escape and recover their artillery pieces.

== Background ==
During the winter of 1810–1811, the French army of Marshal André Masséna maintained its futile siege of Lord Wellington's Anglo-Portuguese Army, which was sheltered behind the Lines of Torres Vedras near Lisbon. Masséna finally ran out of supplies and withdrew toward Almeida in March. Meanwhile, farther to the south, Marshal Nicolas Soult laid siege to Badajoz on 26 January. The fortress fell to the French on 11 March.

On 15 March, Marshal Édouard Mortier and 4,500 troops belonging to the V Corps laid siege to Campo Maior Castle. Major José Talaya with 800 Portuguese militia and 50 old cannon stoutly defended the ancient Portuguese fortress, located 18 km northwest of Badajoz. The castle held out until 21 March when the French bombardment rendered the place indefensible.

Wellington despatched Marshal William Beresford with an 18,000 strong army to relieve Badajoz; when news of the city's fall reached the allies Beresford continued his advance with the aim of recapturing Badajoz.

== Battle ==
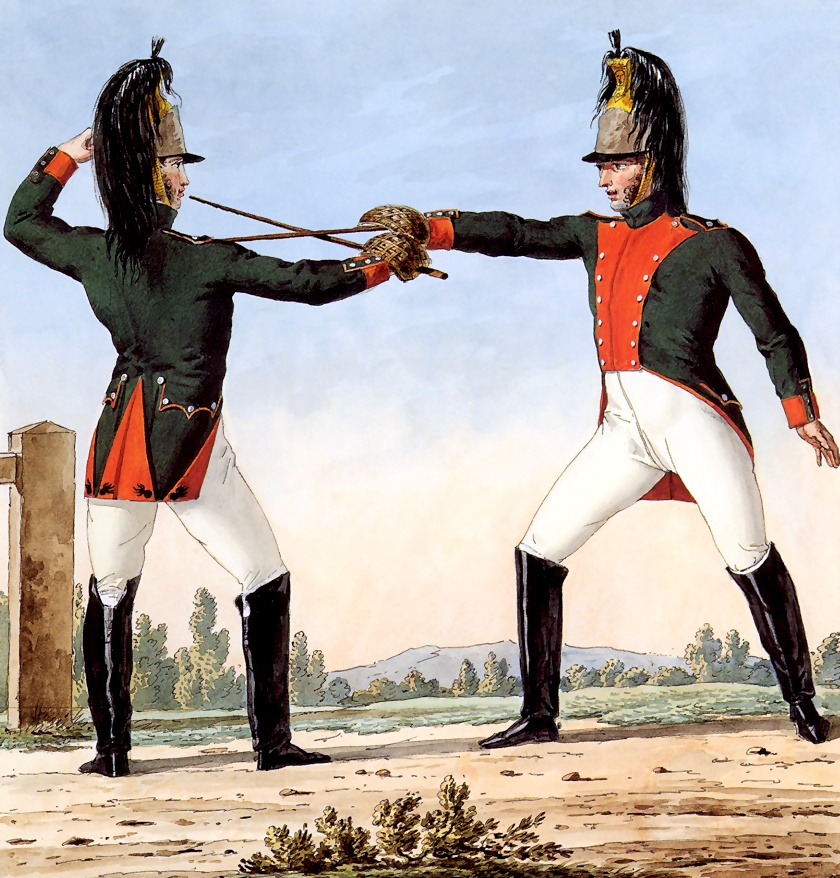
The French 26th Dragoons

Mortier assigned Latour-Maubourg to escort a convoy of French siege cannons from Campo Maior, which the French were abandoning, to Badajoz. The French force included three battalions of the 100th Line Infantry Regiment, French sources say two battalions - totalling 1,200 infantry. Additionally, there was half a battery of horse artillery and eight squadrons of cavalry: the 2nd and 10th Hussars, the 26th Dragoons, and one squadron of the 4th Chasseurs a juramentado (pro-French) Spanish light cavalry regiment. In order to interfere with the French operation Beresford sent Brigadier-General Robert Long ahead with a force of cavalry fifteen and a half squadrons strong: a British heavy cavalry brigade, a Portuguese light cavalry brigade and an unbrigaded British light cavalry regiment. The only units to see action were the 13th Light Dragoons, the 1st and 7th Portuguese Cavalry Regiments, and part of Cleeves' KGL artillery battery, a total of 700 sabres and two cannon.

On 25 March, Long hurled the 13th Light Dragoons (two and a half squadrons) at the 26th Dragoons (three squadrons), with the Portuguese 7th Dragoons (two weak squadrons) covering their left flank. The French dragoons were broken and their commanding officer, General Chamorin, was killed. The whole French cavalry covering force of six squadrons - two remained in support of the infantry - was routed and fled in the direction of Badajoz. The historian Sir John Fortescue wrote, "Of the performance of Thirteenth, who did not exceed two hundred men, in defeating twice or thrice their numbers single-handed, it is difficult to speak too highly." The British horsemen, followed by the 7th Portuguese Dragoons under Loftus Otway, embarked on a wild pursuit of the defeated Frenchmen. They came upon the convoy of 18 siege guns, overran it, and continued on for 11 kilometres (6.8 mi). Incredibly, some of the Light Dragoons charged onto the glacis of the Badajoz fortress and were repulsed by its fire. French cavalry emerged from the city to drive away the allied horsemen. Beresford, who had been given an erroneous report that the 13th LD had been captured in its entirety, called off the action when two of his cannon had just opened fire on the French column, the British heavy cavalry were within striking distance and British infantry were coming up. Beresford's decision to call off his troops when they appeared to be in a position to destroy or force the surrender of the entire French column was taken by his detractors as an early sign of the lack of military insight he was to show later in the campaign at the Battle of Albuera.

Following Beresford's halting of his troops, the French infantry continued unmolested along the road and, having been passed by the returning allied light cavalry, easily recaptured the convoy and successfully escorted it into Badajoz. However, the allied cavalry managed to retain and carry off one captured cannon (howitzer). Napier records the captured artillery piece as a howitzer. A field howitzer, due to its short barrel, would have been the lightest and easiest piece to remove.

== Result ==
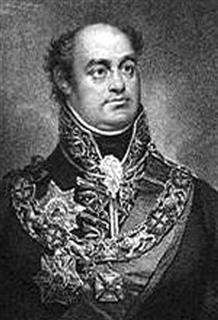
Marshal Beresford

Out of 2,400 engaged, the French suffered 200 casualties, including 108 from the 26th Dragoons, plus one cannon. Total Allied losses were 168. The 13th Light Dragoons lost 10 killed, 27 wounded, and 22 captured. The Portuguese regiments lost 14 killed, 40 wounded, and 55 captured. The Allies recovered Campo Maior.

The pursuit of Latour-Maubourg's force faltered despite the British and Portuguese outnumbering them greatly. The reason behind this failure was subsequently disputed between supporters of Brigadier Long and Marshal Beresford. The cavalry clash at Campo Maior was to become a very controversial action. Beresford considered that Long had lost control of his light cavalry. Beresford also claimed that his taking personal command of the heavy dragoon brigade had prevented Long from ordering them to attempt a suicidal charge against French infantry squares. Long was of the opinion, and was subsequently supported in this by the historian Sir William Napier, that if Beresford had released the British brigade of heavy dragoons he would have been able to drive off the remaining French cavalry (two squadrons who had not been charged by the 13th LD and some rallied fugitives), who were in close support of their infantry, and consequently force the French infantry to surrender.

Three other incidents where Wellington's cavalry charged out of control were the 20th Light Dragoons at the Battle of Vimeiro, the 23rd Light Dragoons at the Battle of Talavera, and John Slade's brigade at the Battle of Maguilla. The next major action in the southern sector would be the Battle of Albuera.

== Aftermath ==
Wellington, after receiving Beresford's report on the clash at Campo Maior, issued a particularly harsh reprimand to the 13th LD calling them "a rabble" and threatening to remove their horses from them and send the regiment to do duty at Lisbon. The officers of the regiment then wrote a collective letter to Wellington detailing the particulars of the action. Wellington is reported as saying that had he known the full facts he would never have issued the reprimand. The publication of Napier's history of the Peninsular War in the 1830s re-ignited the controversy surrounding Campo Maior, and led to a vituperative pamphlet campaign between Napier and Long's nephew on the one side and Beresford and his supporters on the other.

== Notes ==
Preceded by Battle of Casal Novo	Napoleonic Wars; Battle of Campo Maior	Succeeded by Battle of Sabugal
