= William Joseph Williams =

American painter (1759–1823)

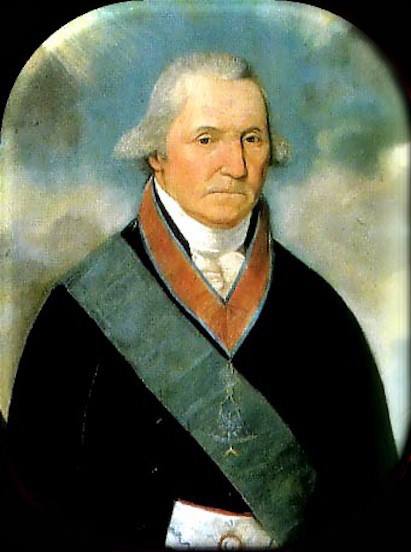
Portrait of George Washington by Williams, 1794

William Joseph Williams (November 17, 1759 – November 30, 1823) was an American portrait and miniature painter.

== Biography ==
He was born in New York City, the son of William Williams, a Welsh painter born in Bristol, and Mary Mare Williams, sister of the painter John Mare.

Williams resided in New Bern, North Carolina from 1804 to 1823, after living in Philadelphia, Georgetown, and Charleston.

He painted portraits of Presidents Washington John Adams and John Jameson (colonel), as well as other important figures of his time.

Williams died in New Bern and is buried in Cedar Grove Cemetery. Today, Williams is viewed as one of the first American national portraitists.
