= Richard Symonds (diarist) =

English royalist

Richard Symonds (1617–1660) was an English royalist and antiquary, now remembered for an eye-witness diary he wrote of events of the First English Civil War.

== Life ==
He was the eldest son of Edward (or Edmund) Symonds of Black Notley, Essex, where he was born in 1617. His mother, who brought the Notley property into the family, was Anne, daughter of Joshua Draper of Braintree. Like his father and grandfather, as well as several of his uncles and cousins, Symonds became a cursitor of the chancery court.

He was committed a prisoner by Miles Corbet as a delinquent on 25 March 1643, but escaping on 21 October he joined the royalist army, becoming a member of the troop of horse which formed the king's lifeguard, under the command of Lord Bernard Stuart, afterwards Earl of Lichfield. He was with the king’s forces in most of his movements during the ensuing two years, being present at the engagements of Cropredy Bridge, Newbury, Naseby, and at the relief of Chester, where the Earl of Lichfield was killed.

He was subsequently with Sir William Vaughan at Denbigh and elsewhere. After the king's surrender, in the autumn of 1646, he applied on 17 December to be allowed to compound for his delinquency, On 1 January 1648 he left London and travelled, first to Paris, and then to Rome and Venice, where he stayed till about the end of 1652, when he returned again to England. In 1655 he was implicated in the abortive plot for restoring the monarchy, and was one of a batch of over seventy persons who were on that account arrested in the eastern counties, but were subsequently released on bond in October.

== Works ==
From an early age Symonds evinced strong antiquarian tastes, and in all his wanderings he seems never to have lost an opportunity for jotting down in his notebook such topographical or genealogical memoranda as he came across. So he kept a diary of the marchings of the royal army from 10 April 1644 to 11 February 1646 (four notebooks now held in the British Library). These were frequently quoted by county historians, and in 1859 were edited for the Camden Society by Charles Edward Long, under the title Diary of the Marches of the Royal Army during the Great Civil War. Much of the interest of the diary lies in its topographical content, including detailed notes of churches, church monuments, stained glass and heraldry that Symonds had viewed. Most of his entries about the war are accurate but terse. However, his description of the second battle of Newbury is very detailed.

Three volumes of genealogical collections for the county of Essex, compiled by Symonds, were preserved at the College of Arms, to which they were presented in 1710 by Gregory King, into whose possession they had come in 1685. In the second volume Symonds gives the pedigree of his own family, and near his own name is an impression, in red wax, of an engraved head in profile, probably that of Symonds himself, by Thomas Simon, the medallist. These collections were used by Philip Morant in his History of Essex. Other notes were used by Horace Walpole in his Anecdotes of Painting in England.
