= Abraham Delanoy =

American painter

Portrait of Benjamin West, 1766, oil on canvas. In the collection of New York Historical.

Abraham Delanoy, Jr. (sometimes given as De Lanoy) (1742 – 1795) was a portrait painter active in the colony of New York. He was a pupil of Benjamin West in London.

== Early life ==
Abraham Delanoy, Jr. was born in 1742, and was most likely the son of another Abraham De Lanoy, a merchant, and grandson of the area schoolmaster. The family were relatives of the Beekman family, from whom some of his known commissions came. Abraham's great-uncle, Peter Delanoy, was the first elected mayor of New York City at the time when the English were taking the colony over from the Dutch. Delanoy was also a descendant of Abraham De Lanoy, who married Cornelia Toll Duyckinck after the early death of her husband. Her son was the limner Evert Duyckinck III, and it has been suggested that it was his relationship to this artistic family that led to the young man's choice of profession. The De Lanoys were among the earliest settlers of New Amsterdam and were tradespeople and merchants.

== Career ==
Nothing is known of his early training, nor of the reason or date of his journey to London, though he is said to have been the second painter to study with West, and may be one of the figures in The American School, the well-known painting by Matthew Pratt. He left that city soon after the arrival of Charles Willson Peale in February, 1767; the latter artist recorded that Delanoy had remained in town long after West believed he had returned home. West encouraged his pupil to copy one or two paintings to take home with him.

Delanoy was back in New York by May 28, 1767, when he advertised his services in the New-York Journal or the General Advertiser. He had less success than other London trained painters, such as Peale or Henry Benbridge, but did find patronage among members of the Beekman family, formerly patrons of Lawrence Kilburn. He also sold wines and other foodstuffs, beginning not long after his return from London. In 1768, advertisements reveal, he traveled in search of work to the West Indies and Charleston, South Carolina, but he was back in New York by January, 1771; no work from these travels has been identified. Only nine portraits survive from his time in New York, and most are associated with him by attribution, though one is said to have been signed and dated on the original canvas. Delanoy was still in New York in the early 1780s, having spent the duration of the American Revolutionary War living in the city, and gave some lessons to William Dunlap, who later wrote sadly of his former teacher's later years, stating that he was consumptive and poor, and reduced to painting signs to make a living. From June 1784 until April 1787, Delanoy was in New Haven, Connecticut, employed as a general painter; a single pastel dating to this time is his only known work in that genre. He returned to New York City for three years, before moving in 1790 to Westchester County, where he died.

Delanoy is said to have been "awkward in his address and of unprepossessing appearance". A portrait of Benjamin West is currently owned by the New York Historical Society. The pastel portrait, believed to be of Mrs. Simeon Jocelyn (born Luceanna Smith), is in the collection of the Connecticut Historical Society. Portraits of members of the Sherman, Livingston and Stuyvesant families are known as well, many of which are privately owned. Susan Clay Sawitzky suggested that he was the so-called Sherman Limner, two of whose works are in the National Gallery of Art, but this identification is not universally accepted.

== Personal life ==
On September 27, 1763, he married Rachel Martling, sometimes called Martling.

He died in Westchester County in 1795.
