= The Amazing Race 21 =

Season of television series

- Season 21
- Region 1 DVD cover
- Presented by: Phil Keoghan
- No. of teams: 11
- Winners: Josh Kilmer-Purcell & Brent Ridge
- No. of legs: 12
- Distance traveled: 25,000 mi (40,000 km)
- No. of episodes: 11

Release
- Original network: CBS
- Original release: September 30 – December 9, 2012

Additional information
- Filming dates: May 26 – June 16, 2012

Series chronology
- ← Previous; Season 20 Next → Season 22

The Amazing Race 21 is the twenty-first season of the American reality competition show The Amazing Race. Hosted by Phil Keoghan, it featured eleven teams of two, each with a pre-existing relationship, competing in a race around the world. This season visited three continents and nine countries and traveled over 25,000 miles (40,000 km) during twelve legs. Starting in Pasadena, California, racers traveled through China, Indonesia, Bangladesh, Turkey, Russia, the Netherlands, Spain, and France before returning to the United States and finishing in New York City. New elements introduced in this season include the Blind Double U-Turn and the Double Your Money prize. While the prize for winning the season remained at US$1 million, if the team that came in first in the first leg had also won the final leg, the prize would have been doubled to US$2 million. The season premiered on CBS on September 30, 2012, and concluded on December 9, 2012.

The Fabulous Beekman Boys stars and life partners Josh Kilmer-Purcell and Brent Ridge were the winners of this season, while Chippendales dancers Jaymes Vaughan and James Davis finished in second place, and dating couple Trey Wier and Lexi Beerman finished in third place.

== Production ==
=== Development and filming ===
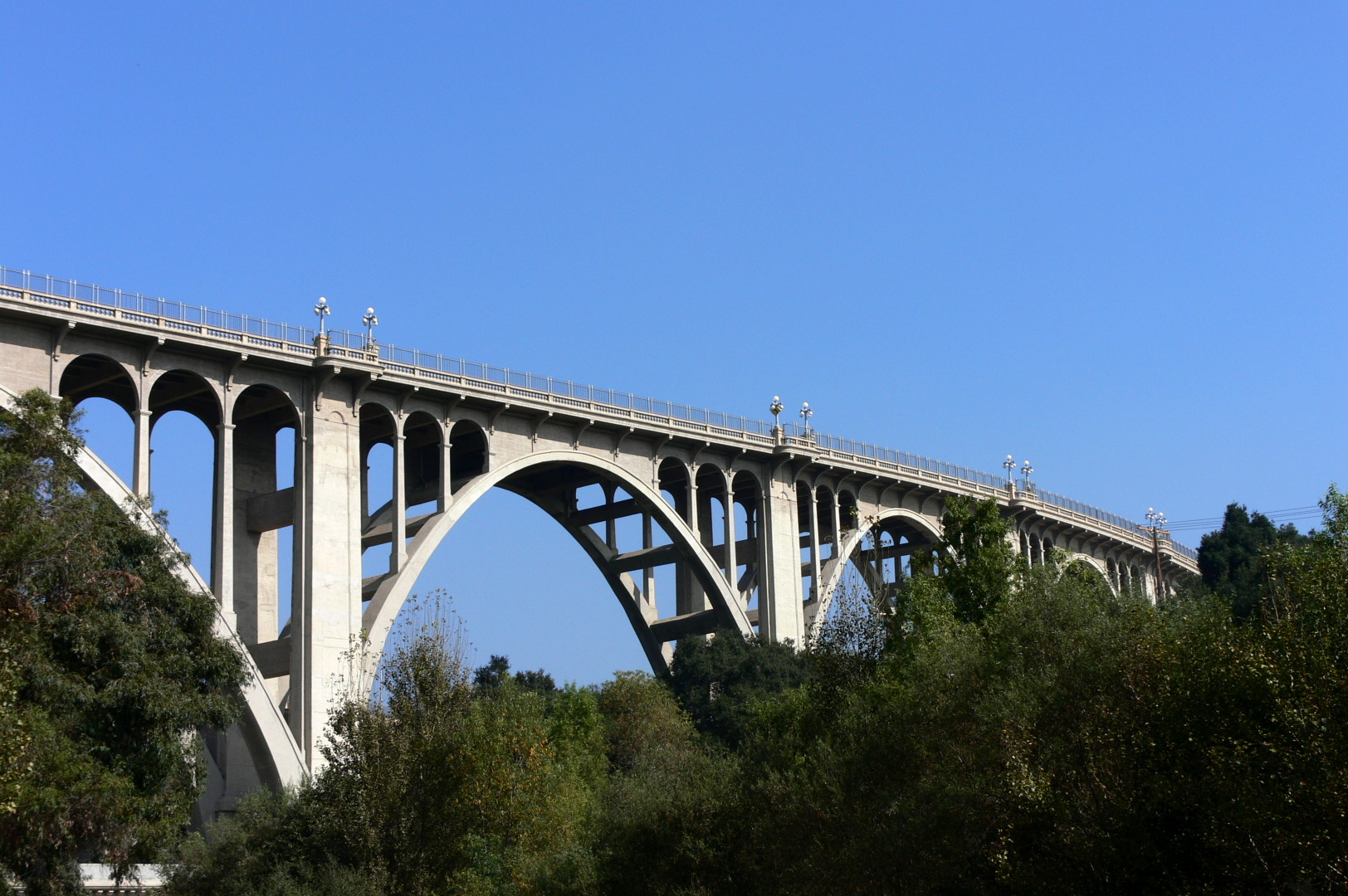
The starting line for The Amazing Race 21 was atop the Colorado Street Bridge in Pasadena, California.

Season 21 was broadcast during the 2012 fall season on CBS. Filming took place from late May 2012 to mid-June 2012. It spanned a little over 25,000 miles (40,000 km) of travel to three continents and nine countries.

This season introduced the "Double Your Money" prize. The team who won the first leg would have been eligible to win a total of $2 million if they ultimately won the race. Elise Doganieri, co-executive producer for the show, called the larger potential prize "a real game-changer". While teams reacted with excitement at the larger prize, Doganieri hoped that if it were won, the additional prize money would be used for "something wonderful" such as supporting charitable medical research. Abbie Ginsberg and Ryan Danz, the winners of the Double Your Money prize, were eliminated at the end of the ninth leg.

Leg 3 featured the series' first-ever Blind Double U-Turn, where two teams could U-Turn another team, and whichever team used the U-Turn remained anonymous.

Although contestants are typically forbidden contact with family and friends during the filming (except where such contact was part of a task), James LoMenzo was shown video chatting with his wife during the fourth Pit Stop in order to receive an update on his father's medical condition.

During the seventh leg in Moscow, James & Abba left their bags, which included the latter's passport, in an illegal taxi operation, but the cab drove off with their bags while James & Abba performed the task. They continued the leg, but before they could check in, they had to try to find Abba's passport to continue the race. Ultimately, James & Abba ended the leg in last place, which was a non-elimination leg, but if they were required to leave the country in a subsequent leg, they would be automatically disqualified. The next leg remained in Russia, but James & Abba ended up in last after spending time again searching for the passport and were eliminated. As production continued, the two had to secure an exit visa for Abba in lieu of a valid passport. According to Abba, the events of these legs occurred on the Friday and Saturday prior to a major Russian holiday, and it became difficult to work through the limited bureaucracy to do this. James & Abba were fortunate enough that Abba's prior fame was recognized by an employee at the U.S. Embassy, and they were able to secure the visa in time to fly back to the United States on the day before the finale.

== Contestants ==
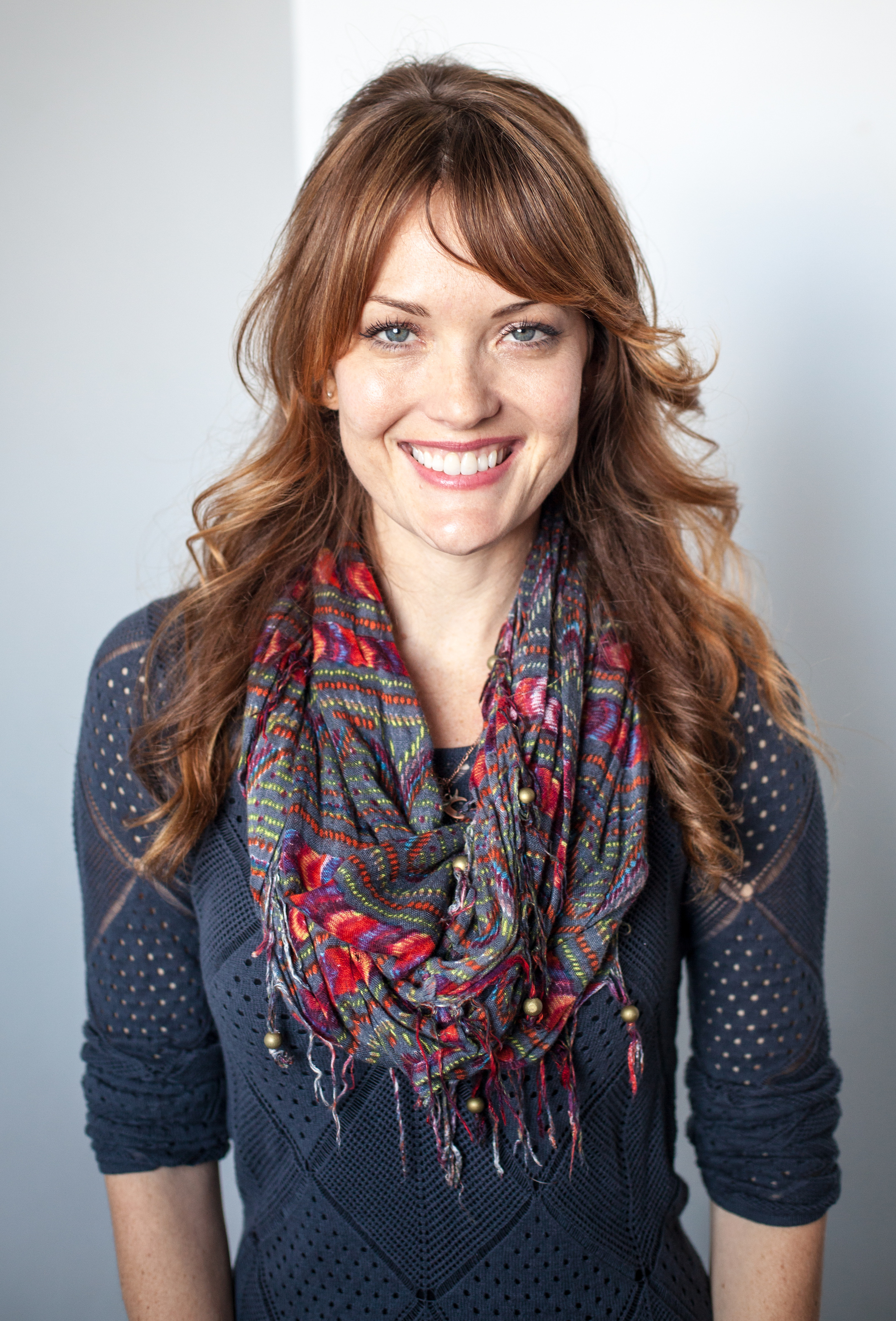
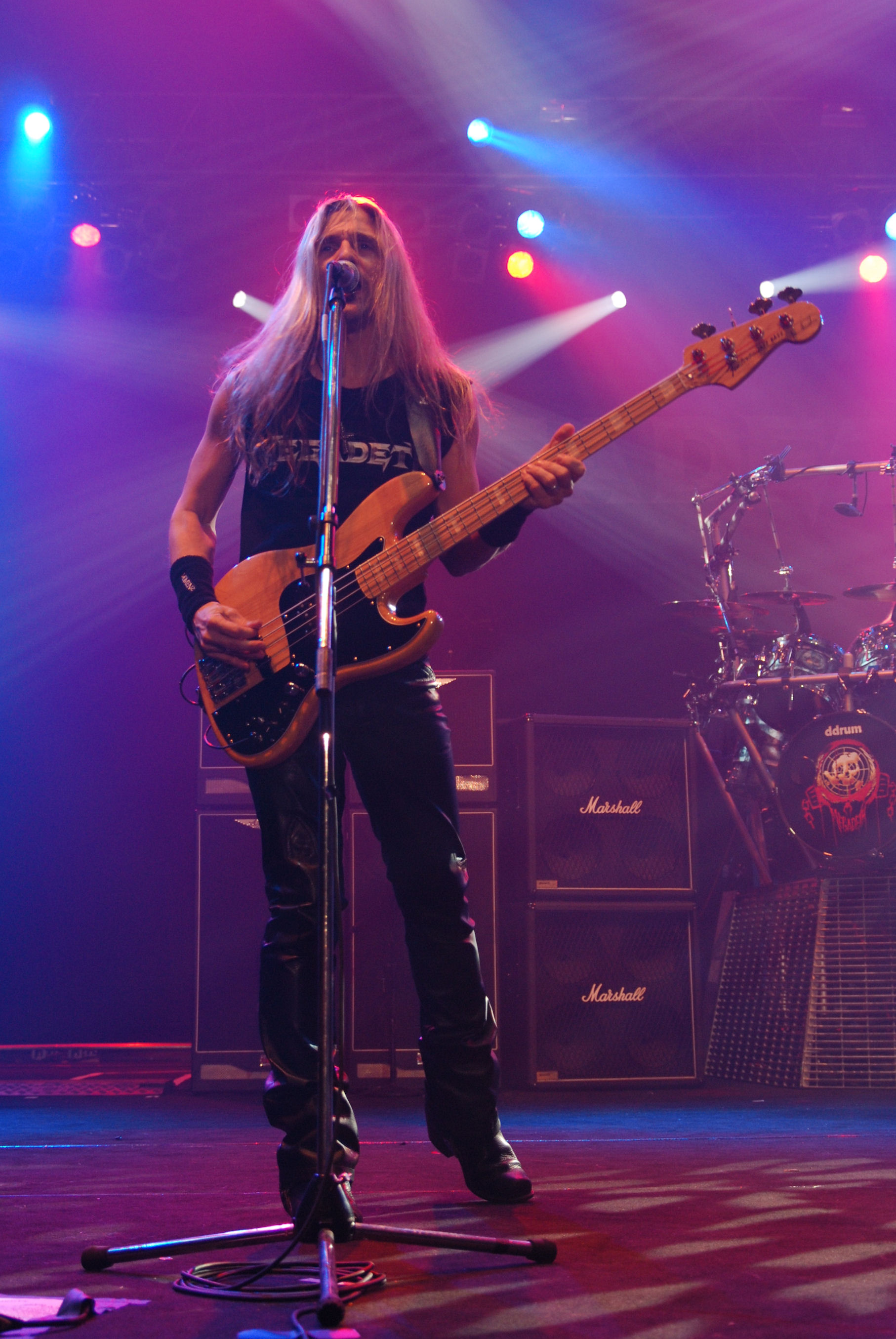
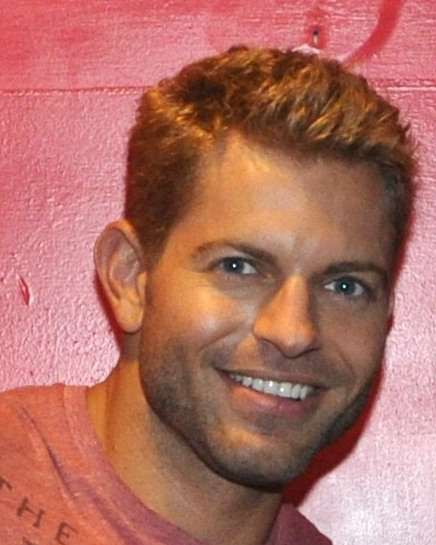
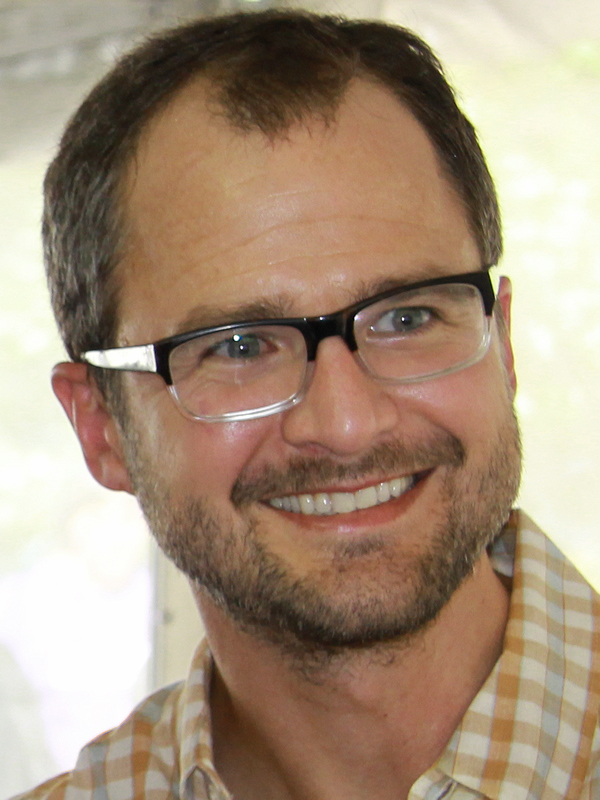
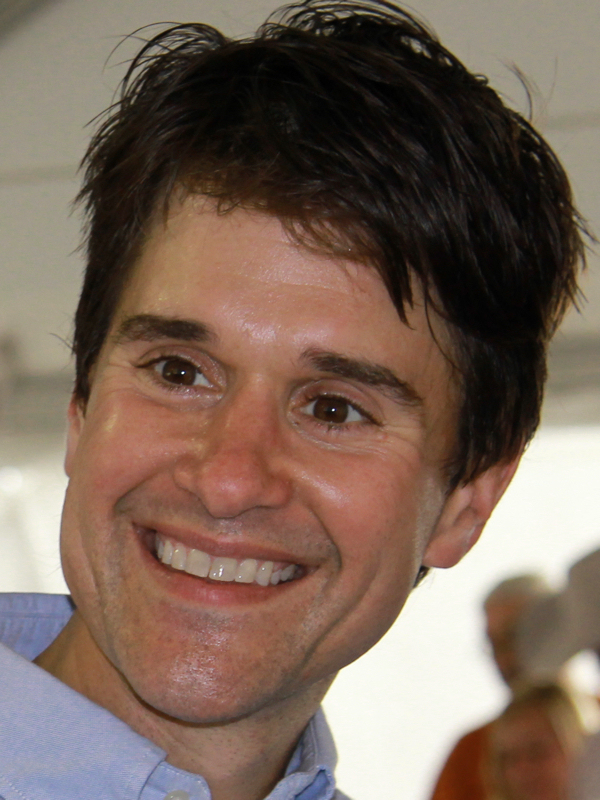
From left to right: Amy Purdy, James LoMenzo, Jaymes Vaughan, Josh Kilmer-Purcell, and Brent Ridge

This season's cast included The Fabulous Beekman Boys stars Josh Kilmer-Purcell and Brent Ridge, former White Lion and Megadeth metal bassist James LoMenzo, Chippendales dancers Jaymes Vaughan and James Davis, double amputee professional snowboarder Amy Purdy, and former The Apprentice: Martha Stewart contestant Ryan Danz.

Contestants	Age	Relationship	Hometown	Status
Rob Scheer	52	Lumberjack & Marketing Exec	Ketchikan, Alaska	Eliminated 1st (in Shanghai, China)
Sheila Castle	44	Lumberjack & Marketing Exec	Pigeon Forge, Tennessee	Eliminated 1st (in Shanghai, China)
Amy Purdy	32	Dating On and Off	Las Vegas, Nevada	Eliminated 2nd (in Surabaya, Indonesia)
Daniel Gale	36	Dating On and Off	Crested Butte, Colorado	Eliminated 2nd (in Surabaya, Indonesia)
Caitlin King	24	Best Friends	St. Louis, Missouri	Eliminated 3rd (in Bangil, Indonesia)
Brittany Fletcher	25	Best Friends	Chicago, Illinois	Eliminated 3rd (in Bangil, Indonesia)
Gary Wojnar	52	Substitute Teachers	Livonia, Michigan	Eliminated 4th (in Dhaka, Bangladesh)
Will Chiola	53	Substitute Teachers	Dearborn Heights, Michigan	Eliminated 4th (in Dhaka, Bangladesh)
Rob French	46	Married Monster Truckers	Boston, Georgia	Eliminated 5th (in Istanbul, Turkey)
Kelley Carrington-French	50	Married Monster Truckers	Boston, Georgia	Eliminated 5th (in Istanbul, Turkey)
James LoMenzo	53	Rock Star & Lawyer	Burbank, California	Eliminated 6th (in Moscow, Russia)
Mark "Abba" Abbattista	45	Rock Star & Lawyer	Denver, Colorado	Eliminated 6th (in Moscow, Russia)
Abbie Ginsberg	31	Dating Divorcés	Encinitas, California	Eliminated 7th (in Ransdorp, Netherlands)
Ryan Danz	35	Dating Divorcés	San Diego, California	Eliminated 7th (in Ransdorp, Netherlands)
Natalie Anderson	26	Twins	Edgewater, New Jersey	Eliminated 8th (in Chenonceaux, France)
Nadiya Anderson	26	Twins	Edgewater, New Jersey	Eliminated 8th (in Chenonceaux, France)
Trey Wier	23	Dating	Austin, Texas	Third place
Lexi Beerman	22	Dating	Dripping Springs, Texas	Third place
Jaymes Vaughan	30	Chippendales	Las Vegas, Nevada	Runners-up
James Davis	27	Chippendales	Las Vegas, Nevada	Runners-up
Josh Kilmer-Purcell	43	Goat Farmers	Sharon Springs, New York	Winners
Brent Ridge	38	Goat Farmers	Sharon Springs, New York	Winners

Future appearances

Natalie and Nadiya Anderson returned for The Amazing Race: All-Stars. They later competed on Survivor: San Juan del Sur. On May 23, 2016, Natalie appeared on a Survivor-themed primetime special of The Price Is Right. Natalie then returned to compete on Survivor: Winners at War, and Nadiya also made an appearance as part of the loved ones visit. Natalie also competed on the thirty-sixth season of the MTV reality show The Challenge, but had to withdraw in the fifth episode after learning that she was pregnant. In 2026, Natalie Anderson competed on the fourth season of The Traitors.

Amy Purdy later competed in the eighteenth season of the ABC reality series Dancing with the Stars. On June 9, 2014, she appeared on CBS's The Price Is Right as a guest model. On April 1, 2016, Purdy appeared on TLC's Say Yes to the Dress. She later also appeared in the 2016 Summer Paralympics opening ceremony where she danced with a robotic arm.

== Results ==
The following teams are listed with their placements in each leg. Placements are listed in finishing order.

- A red placement with a dagger (†) indicates that the team was eliminated.
- An underlined blue placement with a double-dagger (‡) indicates that the team was the last to arrive at a Pit Stop in a non-elimination leg, and had to perform a Speed Bump task in the following leg.
- A green ƒ indicates that the team won the Fast Forward.
- A purple ε indicates that the team used an Express Pass on that leg to bypass one of their tasks.
- A brown ⊃ indicates that the team used the U-Turn and a brown ⊂ indicates the team on the receiving end of the U-Turn.

Team placement (by leg)
Team	1	2	3	4	5	6	7	8	9	10	11	12
Josh & Brent	7th	5th	5th	4th	7th‡	6th	5th	5th	4th	3rd	3rd	1st
Jaymes & James	10th	3rd	3rd	6th	6th	5th	2nd	1st	2nd⊃ (Note: Jaymes & James chose to use the U-Turn on Abbie & Ryan.)	2nd	1st	2nd
Trey & Lexi	9th	2nd	2nd	7th	5th	1st	1st	2nd	3rd	1st	2nd	3rd
Natalie & Nadiya	4th	1st	6th	3rd	3rd	4th	3rd	3rdε (Note: Natalie & Nadiya used their Express Pass to bypass the Roadblock on this leg.)	1stƒ (Note: This team won the Fast Forward on this leg.)	4th‡	4th†	
Abbie & Ryan	1st	4th	1st	2nd	2nd	2nd	4th	4th	5th†⊂			
James & Abba	6th	6th	4th	1stƒ	1st	3rd	6th‡ (Note: James & Abba initially arrived 4th, but were not allowed to check in because Abba's passport was among the items stolen by their cab driver during the Roadblock. While they tried to retrieve the passport, Abbie & Ryan and Josh & Brent checked in during this time, dropping James & Abba to last. However, as this was a non-elimination leg, they were allowed to continue racing until such time as they would need their passports to travel.)	6th†				
Rob & Kelley	5th	8th	7th⊃ (Note: Rob & Kelley chose to use the U-Turn on Gary & Will.)	5th (Note: Rob & Kelley initially arrived 4th, but took a boat directly to the Pit Stop instead of to Swarighat, as had been instructed in the clue. They had to return to their boat and take the proper route. Josh & Brent checked in during this time, dropping Rob & Kelley to 5th.)	4th	7th†						
Gary & Will	8th	9th	8th⊂	8th†								
Caitlin & Brittany	3rd	7th	9th† (Note: In an unaired scene, Caitlin & Brittany initially arrived 6th, but had missed the clue at the U-Turn and only found the Pit Stop by chance. They had to return to the U-Turn to retrieve their clue. During this time, three teams checked in, dropping Caitlin & Brittany to last.)									
Amy & Daniel	2nd	10th†										
Rob & Sheila	11th†											

== Race summary ==
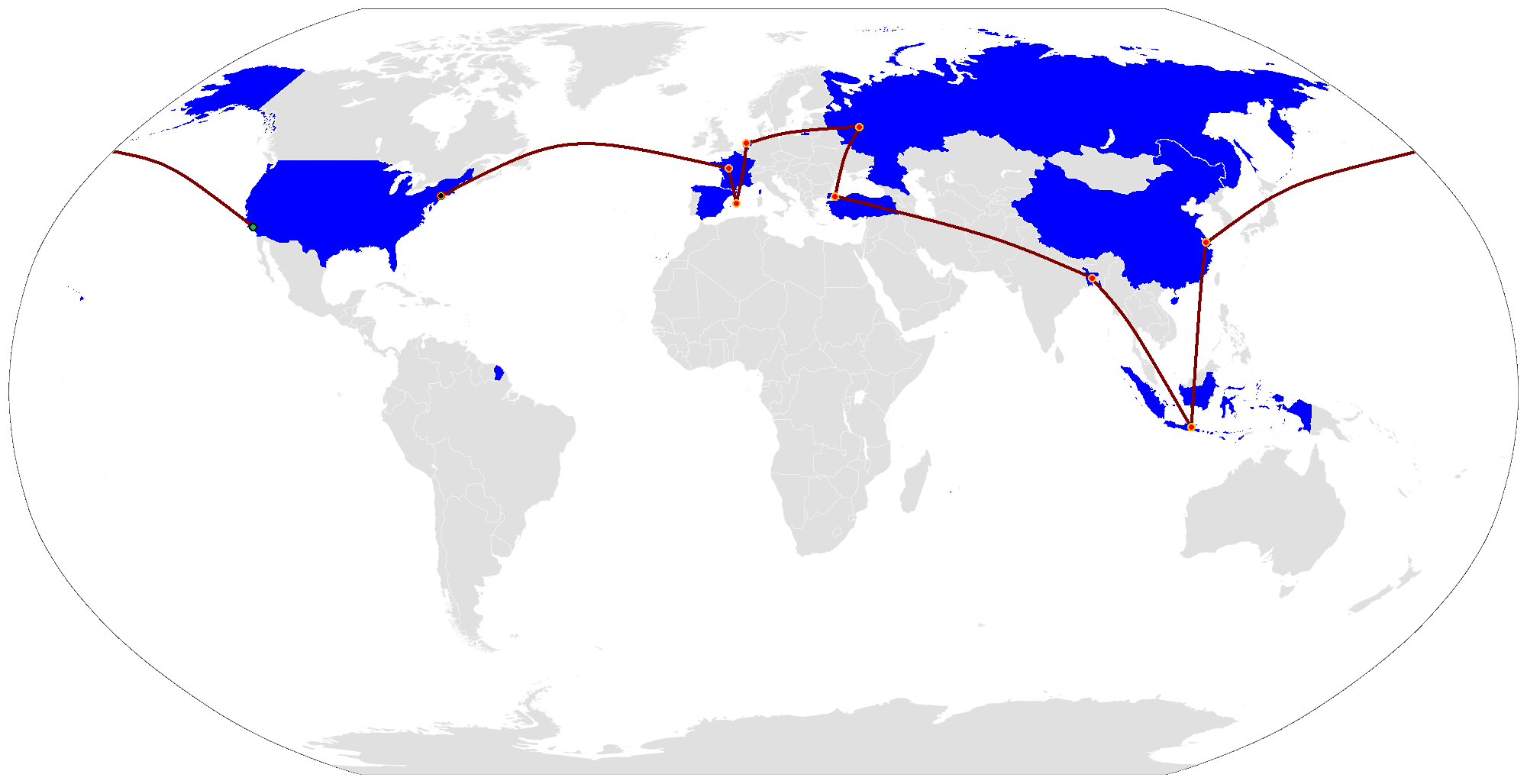
The route of The Amazing Race 21.

Destinations	Air travel Rail travel Water travel Bus travel Helicopter travel Bicycle travel Gondola travel
Route Markers	Detour Roadblock Fast Forward U-Turn Speed Bump Pit Stop

=== Leg 1 (United States → China) ===
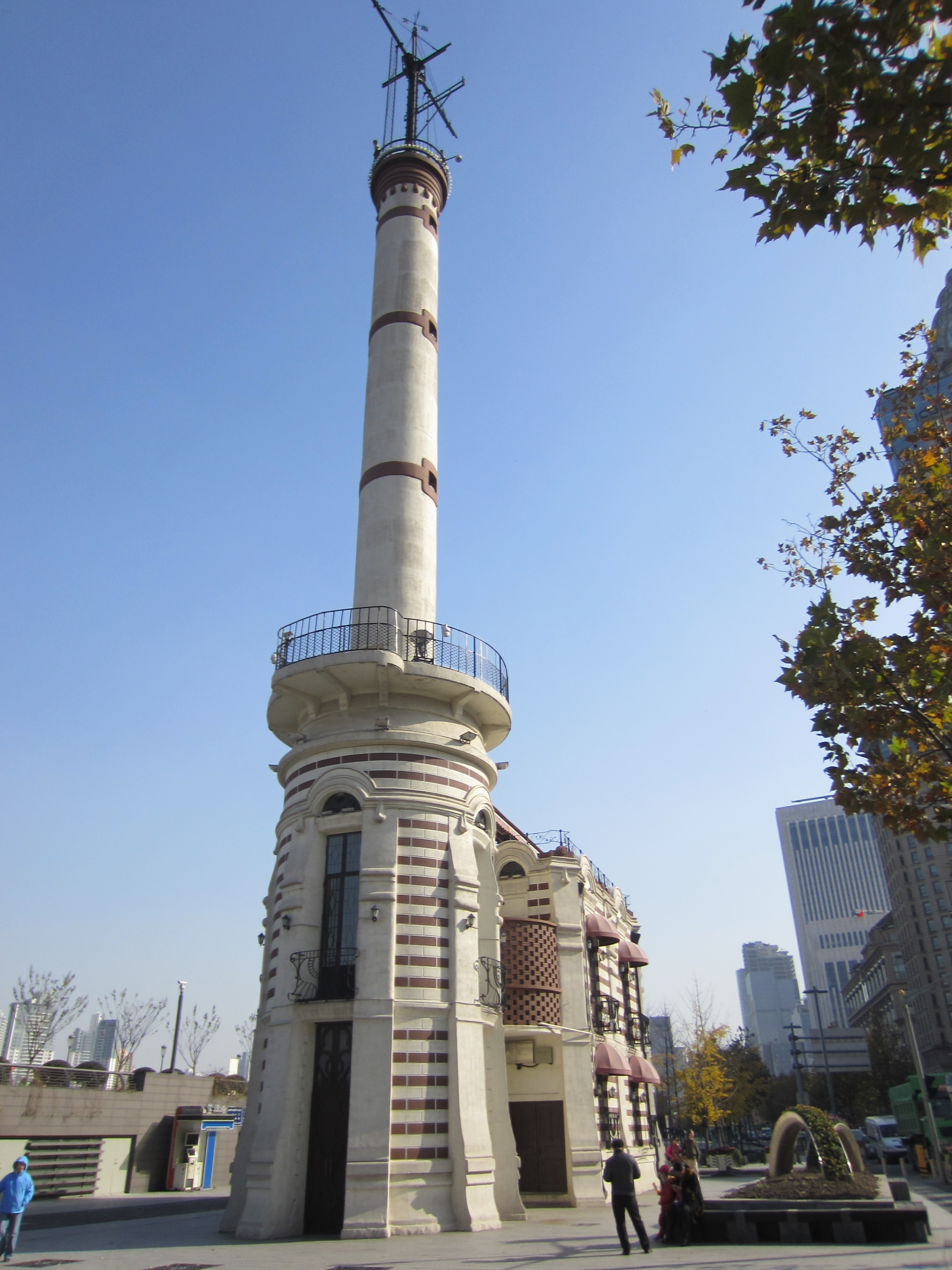
The first Pit Stop of The Amazing Race 21 was at the Bund Signal Tower in Shanghai.

- Episode 1: "Double Your Money" (September 30, 2012)
- Prize: The Double Your Money prize (awarded to Abbie & Ryan)
- Eliminated: Rob & Sheila

Locations

- Pasadena, California (Colorado Street Bridge) (Starting Line)
- Los Angeles (Los Angeles International Airport) → Shanghai, China
- Shanghai (Yuanshen Sports Centre Stadium)
- Shanghai (Cui Ping Jiu Jia Restaurant)
- Shanghai (The Bund)
- Shanghai (Bund Signal Tower)

Episode summary

- At the Colorado Street Bridge, teams had to rappel 10 stories down the side of the bridge in order to retrieve their first clue, which identified their first destination: Shanghai, China. Teams then drove to Los Angeles International Airport and booked one of two flights to Shanghai, with only seven teams able to make the China Airlines flight and the remaining four teams arriving 75 minutes later via EVA Air. Once there, teams had to travel to the Yuanshen Sports Centre Stadium, where they found their next clue.
- In this season's first Roadblock, one team member had to score one point in a game of table tennis against a 10-year-old Chinese national champion in order to receive their next clue. For each attempt after the racers' first match, the champion played with ordinary household objects, such as a clipboard, frying pan, or tambourine instead of a paddle.
- After the Roadblock, teams had to travel to Cui Ping Jiu Jia Restaurant in order to find their next clue.
- In this leg's second Roadblock, the team member who did not perform the previous Roadblock had to eat two servings of a Chinese dessert known as hasma, consisting of the fatty connective tissue around a frog's fallopian tubes served in two hollowed-out papaya halves, using only a provided pair of chopsticks and without lifting the papaya off the table, in order to receive their next clue.
- After the second Roadblock, teams had to travel to The Bund and search the promenade for a woman and boy with traditional Suanpan abaci, who gave them their next clue directing them to the Pit Stop: the Bund Signal Tower.

Additional note

- Abbie & Ryan received the Double Your Money prize for winning the first leg. Had they won The Amazing Race, the grand prize would have been doubled to US$2 million. Since they did not win, the grand prize at the end remained at US$1 million.

=== Leg 2 (China → Indonesia) ===
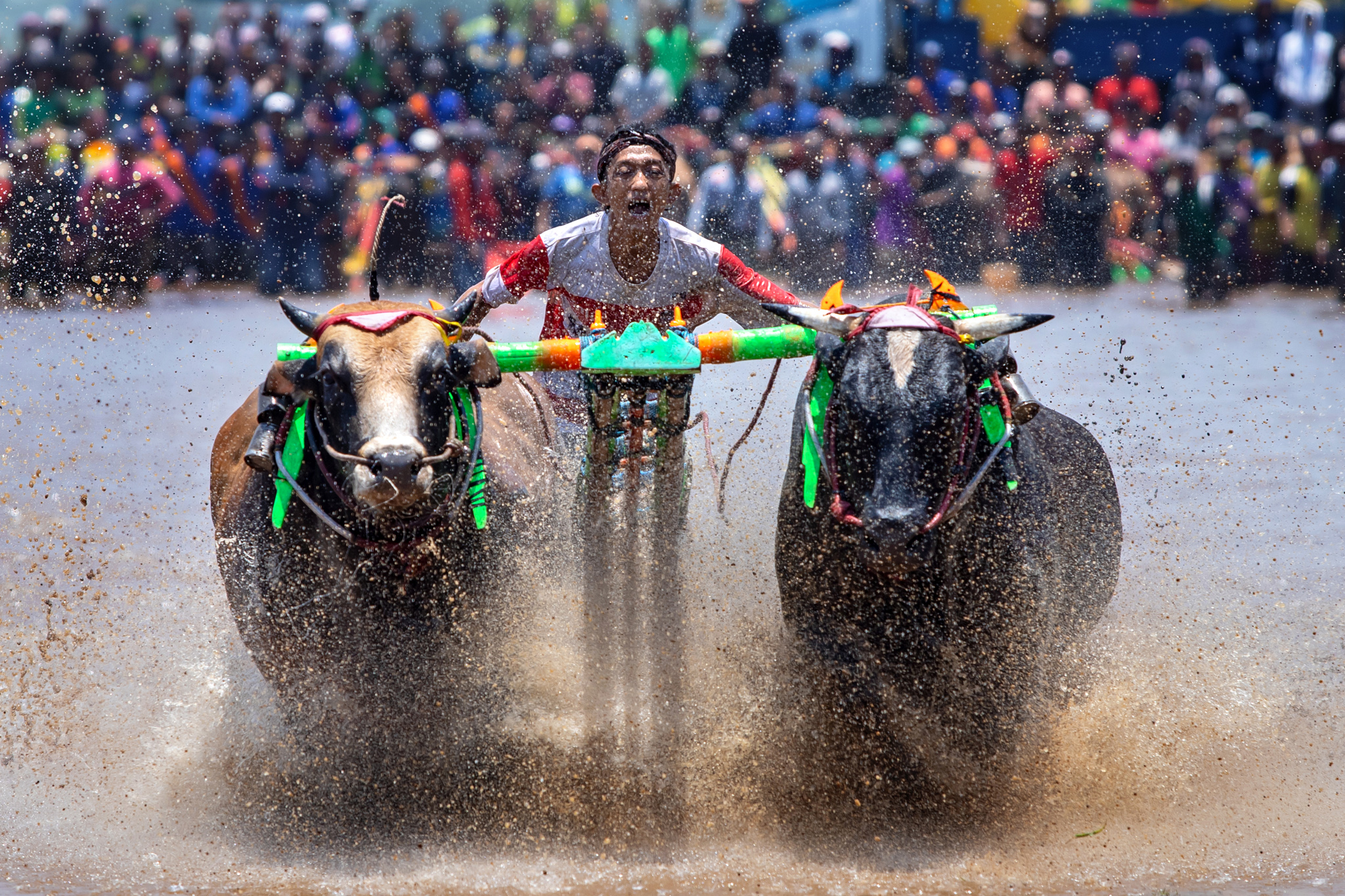
Once in Surabaya, teams headed to Madura Island and rode motorcycles alongside bulls from a traditional Indonesian bull race called karapan sapi.

- Episode 2: "Long Hair, Don't Care" (October 7, 2012)
- Prize: Express Pass (awarded to Natalie & Nadiya)
- Eliminated: Amy & Daniel

Locations

- Shanghai (Bund Signal Tower)
- Shanghai → Surabaya, Indonesia
- Bangkalan (Alun-Alun Bangkalan)
- Surabaya (Genteng Kali Bridge)
- Surabaya (Ekspresi Park)
- Surabaya (Wijaya Motor Shop)
- Surabaya (Tirta Maya Ice Factory & Pabean Fish Market or Pabean Fish Market)
- Surabaya (Pabean Market (in Indonesian))

Episode summary

- At the start of this leg, teams were instructed to fly to Surabaya, Indonesia. Once there, teams traveled across the Suramadu Bridge to an alun-alun stadium in Bangkalan on the island of Madura. Teams picked up a numbered bullwhip that reflected their order in a traditional karapan sapi bull race, with the teams riding on motorcycles alongside the bulls before receiving their next clue. Teams were directed to the Genteng Kali Bridge, where they found their next clue.
- In this leg's Roadblock, one team member had to select four children and operate a pedal-powered ride known as an odong-odong while making eight pieces of balloon art for the children in order to receive their next clue.
- After the Roadblock, teams had to travel by taxi to the Wijaya Motor Shop in order to find their next clue.
- This season's first Detour was a choice between Ice By The Pound or Fish By The Barrel. In Ice By The Pound, teams had to load ten 65-pound (29 kg) blocks of ice from an industrial machine onto a waiting truck, ride the truck to a local market, and then transport the ice by cart to an unloading zone in order to receive their next clue. In Fish By The Barrel, teams had to carry two barrels of fish to a vacant fishmonger's stall inside the Pabean Fish Market. They then had to set up the stall using a display stall as an example, including breaking a block of ice into chips to keep the fish cold, in order to receive their next clue.
- After the Detour, teams had to check in at the Pit Stop: the main entrance of the fish market.

=== Leg 3 (Indonesia) ===
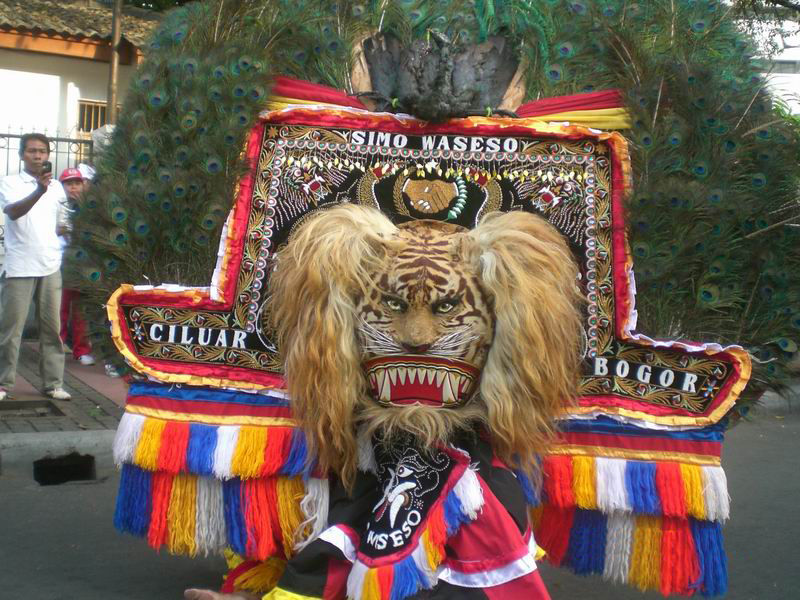
For one of the Detour choices in Bangil, teams performed Javanese reog dance, parading through the streets while wearing giant traditional masks.

- Episode 3: "There's No Crying in Baseball" (October 14, 2012)
- Prize: A trip for two to Tokoriki, Fiji (awarded to Abbie & Ryan)
- Eliminated: Caitlin & Brittany

Locations

- Surabaya (Pabean Market (in Indonesian))
- Surabaya (Antika Jaya Padang Restaurant)
- Surabaya → Bangil
- Bangil (Alun-Alun Bangil)
- Bangil (Perliman POS. I)
- Bangil (State Senior High School 1 of Bangil – Greenhouse)

Episode summary

- At the start of this leg, teams had to travel to the Antika Jaya Padang Restaurant in Surabaya, where they found their next clue.
- In this leg's Roadblock, one team member had to serve a Padang-style meal by carrying 20 dishes of food, all at once, to a table of waiting diners without dropping any in order to receive their next clue.
- After the Roadblock, teams were instructed to travel by train to Bangil. While on the train, teams had to wait for their next clue, which was carried by a food vendor.
- This leg's Detour was a choice between Lion's Head or Egg Head. For both tasks, teams had to travel by becak to Alun-Alun Kota Bangil. In Lion's Head, teams had to walk along a procession route while performing a reog dance, which involved following dance instructions while wearing a 40-pound (18 kg) lion's head mask over their heads and shoulders, in order to receive their next clue. In Egg Head, teams had to purchase four eggs from a local market and then participate in a debus: a show of strength where local magicians lit a coconut half on fire atop each team member's head and used the fire to fry the eggs. Teams then had to eat the cooked eggs with a serving of hot sauce in order to receive their next clue.
- After the Detour, teams had to travel to Perliman POS. I in order to find their next clue directing them to the Pit Stop: the greenhouse of State Senior High School 1 of Bangil.

Additional note

- At the Blind Double U-Turn, Rob & Kelley chose to use the U-Turn on Gary & Will. Not knowing which team used the U-Turn on them, Gary & Will chose to use the second U-Turn on Rob & Kelley, who had already passed and were therefore unaffected.

=== Leg 4 (Indonesia → Bangladesh) ===
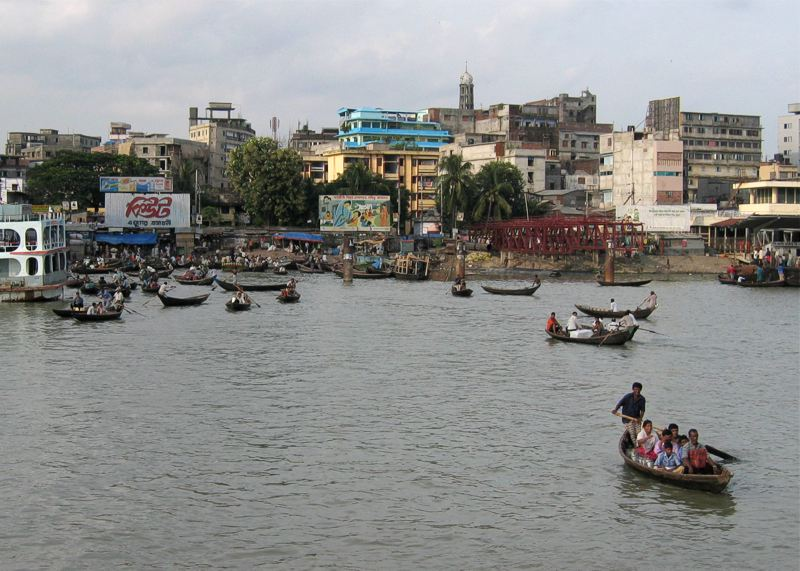
In Dhaka, teams traveled across the Buriganga River to reach this leg's Pit Stop.

- Episode 4: "Funky Monkey" (October 21, 2012)
- Prize: A trip for two to Antigua (awarded to James & Abba)
- Eliminated: Gary & Will

Locations

- Bangil (State Senior High School 1 of Bangil – Greenhouse)
- Surabaya → Dhaka, Bangladesh
- Dhaka (Rubel Model Auto Mobiles)
- Dhaka (Kawran Bazar Shootkir Market)
- Keranigonj → Dhaka (Old Dhaka – Swarighat)
- Dhaka (Old Dhaka – Shyambazar Chan Mia Ghat)

Episode summary

- At the start of this leg, teams were instructed to fly to Dhaka, Bangladesh. Once there, teams had to travel to Rubel Model Auto Mobiles, where they found their next clue.
- In this leg's Roadblock, one team member had to repair one of the Dhaka public transit buses. First, they had to use putty to fill in a damaged section and then sand it for painting. Once approved by a supervisor, they had to carry three pairs of seats to the refurbishing area in order to receive their next clue.
- For this season's first Fast Forward, one team had to fill a bag with dead rats, collecting them from three different locations. James & Abba won the Fast Forward.
- After the Roadblock, teams had to travel to the Kawran Bazar Shootkir Market, where they had to search through hundreds of dried fish to find one marked with Amazing Race colors in order to receive their next clue.
- This leg's Detour was a choice between Pound the Metal or Pound the Cotton. In Pound the Metal, teams had to hand-pump the bellows of a charcoal fire to heat an iron rod and then use sledgehammers to hammer the rod into a sharp spiked tool called a chheny in order to receive their next clue. In Pound the Cotton, teams had to make a cotton mattress via a traditional Bengali method. Teams had to use bamboo rods to beat clumps of cotton into a fine consistency. They then had to stuff the mattress and sew it together in order to receive their next clue.
- After the Detour, teams had to travel by boat to Swarighat and then go on foot to the Pit Stop at Shyambazar Chan Mia Ghat in Old Dhaka.

=== Leg 5 (Bangladesh) ===
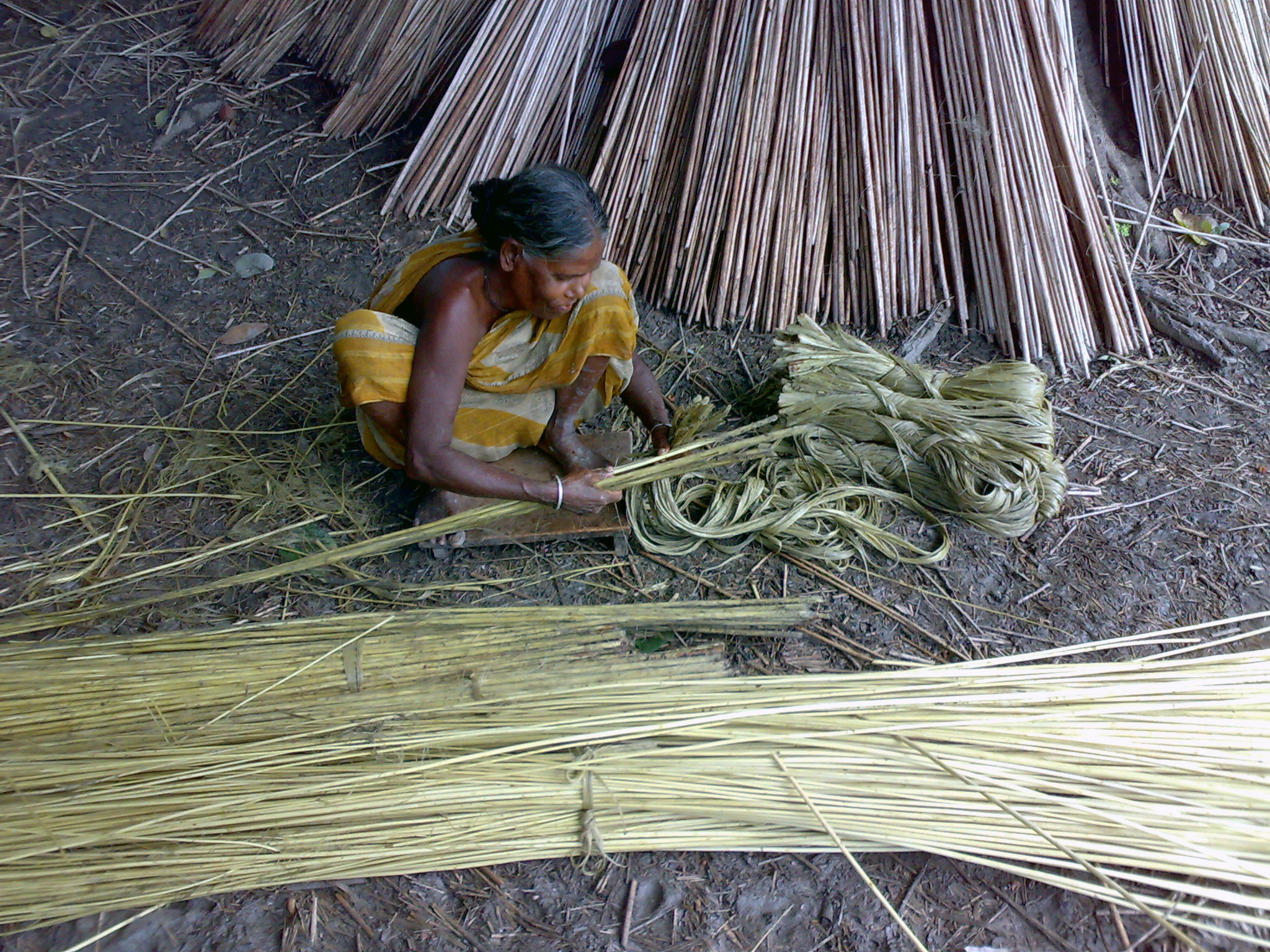
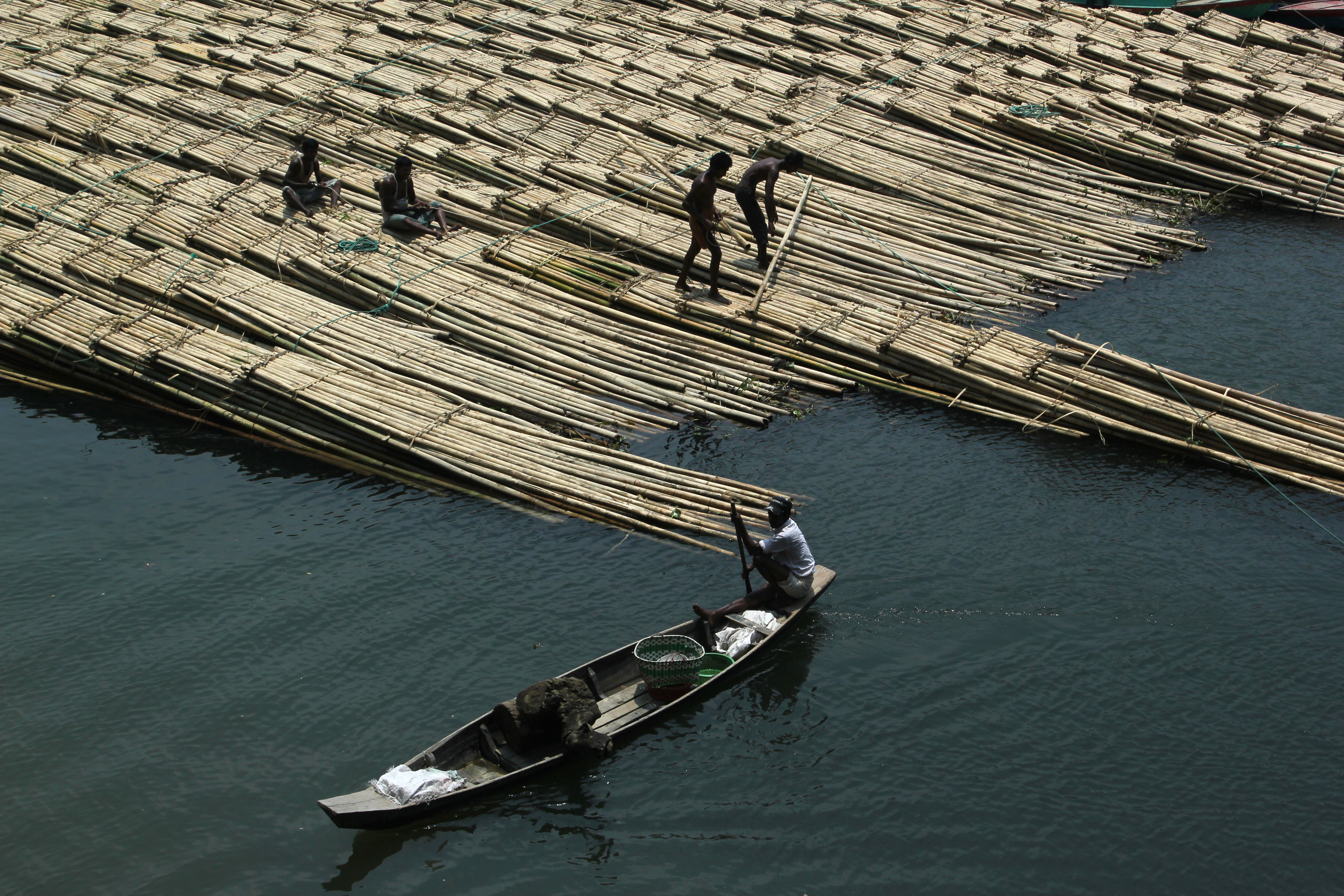
The Detour in Bangladesh made teams choose between two major parts of Bangladeshi industry: jute (left) and bamboo (right).
- Episode 5: "Chill Out, Freak" (October 28, 2012)
- Prize: A trip for two to Langkawi, Malaysia (awarded to James & Abba)

Locations

- Dhaka (Old Dhaka – Shyambazar Chan Mia Ghat)
- Dhaka (Sadarghat)
- Dhaka (Jatrabari Boro Bazar)
- Demra (Ferry Ghat Road)
- Demra (Latif Bawani Jute Mill) or Tarabo (Tarabo Bazar & Shabnam Oil Mill)
- Sonargaon (Lok Shilpa Jadughar)

Episode summary

- At the start of this leg, teams had to find a marked taxi stand at Sadarghat and then travel to the Jatrabari Boro Bazar. There, teams had to find the bēguna vendor, which teams had to figure out was the Bengali word for "eggplant", who had their next clue directing them to Ferry Ghat Road.
- In this leg's Roadblock, one team member had to construct a balance scale from provided bamboo, lashing ropes, and other equipment. Once the scale was approved, racers had to weigh out the proper amount of wood to balance four large stones in order to receive their next clue.
- This leg's Detour was a choice between two forms of Bengali labor: Straw Dogs or Bamboo Jungle. In Straw Dogs, teams had to push a load of unprocessed jute straw to a sorting facility, prepare twenty coils by heckling (throwing them against a nailed board to straighten and separate the fibers), deliver a bundle of completed straw to the mill, and then proceed to the looms at the end of the production line in order to receive their next clue: a jute mat with a painting on it. In Bamboo Jungle, teams had to collect forty bamboo poles of different length and diameter from a storage area at the Tarabo Bazar and then use a platformed cargo bike to transport the bamboo to the Shabnam Oil Mill in order to receive their next clue: a small length of bamboo with a painting on it. The painting on both clues depicted the Pit Stop: the Lok Shilpa Jadughar in Sonargaon.

Additional notes

- Bangladeshi model Rumana Malik Munmun appeared as the Pit Stop greeter during this leg.
- This was a non-elimination leg.

=== Leg 6 (Bangladesh → Turkey) ===
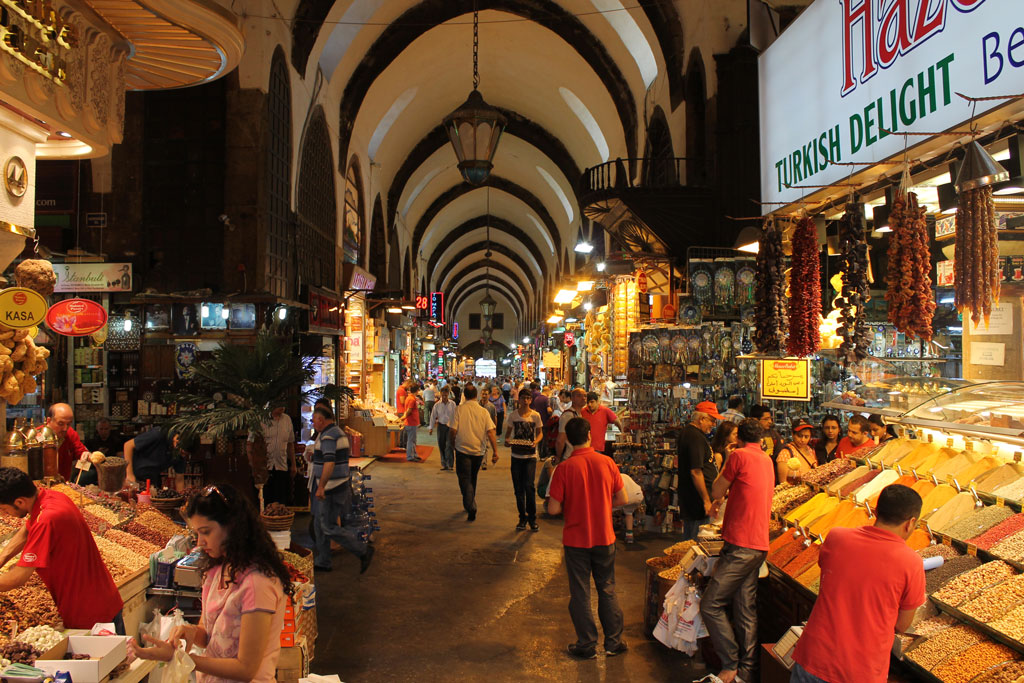
In Istanbul's Grand Bazaar, teams faced a Roadblock where one team member had to sell Turkish sherbet in the busy marketplace.

- Episode 6: "Get Your Sexy On" (November 4, 2012)
- Prize: A trip for two to Gold Coast, Australia (awarded to Trey & Lexi)
- Eliminated: Rob & Kelley

Locations

- Sonargaon (Lok Shilpa Jadughar)
- Dhaka → Istanbul, Turkey
- Istanbul (Kabataş → Üsküdar)
- Istanbul (Mısır Çarşısı)
- Istanbul (New Mosque)
- Istanbul (Simit Bakery or Ayasofya Hürrem Sultan Hamamı)
- Istanbul (Kapalıçarşı)
- Istanbul (Kuruçeşme Cemil Topuzlu Parkı – MV Savarona)

Episode summary

- At the start of this leg, teams were instructed to fly to Istanbul, Turkey. Once there, teams had to travel to the Kabataş Ferry Terminal, where their clue stated, "Welcome to Europe! Now Make Your Way Back to Asia", and instructed them to travel by ferry to Üsküdar on the Asian side of Istanbul in order to find their next clue. Teams were then directed to find Stall No. 14 of the Mısır Çarşısı (the Spice Bazaar), where they received their next clue along with a box of Turkish delight.
- For their Speed Bump, Josh & Brent had to each eat one cone of Maraş ice cream from a nearby stall, which included a teasing performance common with the dessert by the vendor, before they could continue racing.
- This leg's Detour was a choice between Simit or Scrub It. In Simit, teams had to deliver three orders of traditional Turkish bagels known as simits to three different vendors, stacked carefully on a delivery board that one team member had to balance on their head, and also receive proof of delivery from each vendor in order to receive their next clue. In Scrub It, teams had to pick up bathing items from a stall at the Mısır Çarşısı and then travel to a bathhouse, where they received a traditional Turkish bath, after which they received their next clue.
- After the Detour, teams had to travel to the Kapalıçarşı (the Grand Bazaar), where they found their next clue.
- In this leg's Roadblock, one team member had to serve 40 glasses of Turkish sherbet to passersby in the bazaar in order to receive their next clue directing them to the Pit Stop: the MV Savarona, the presidential yacht of Turkey, docked at the Kuruçeşme Cemil Topuzlu Parkı.

=== Leg 7 (Turkey → Russia) ===
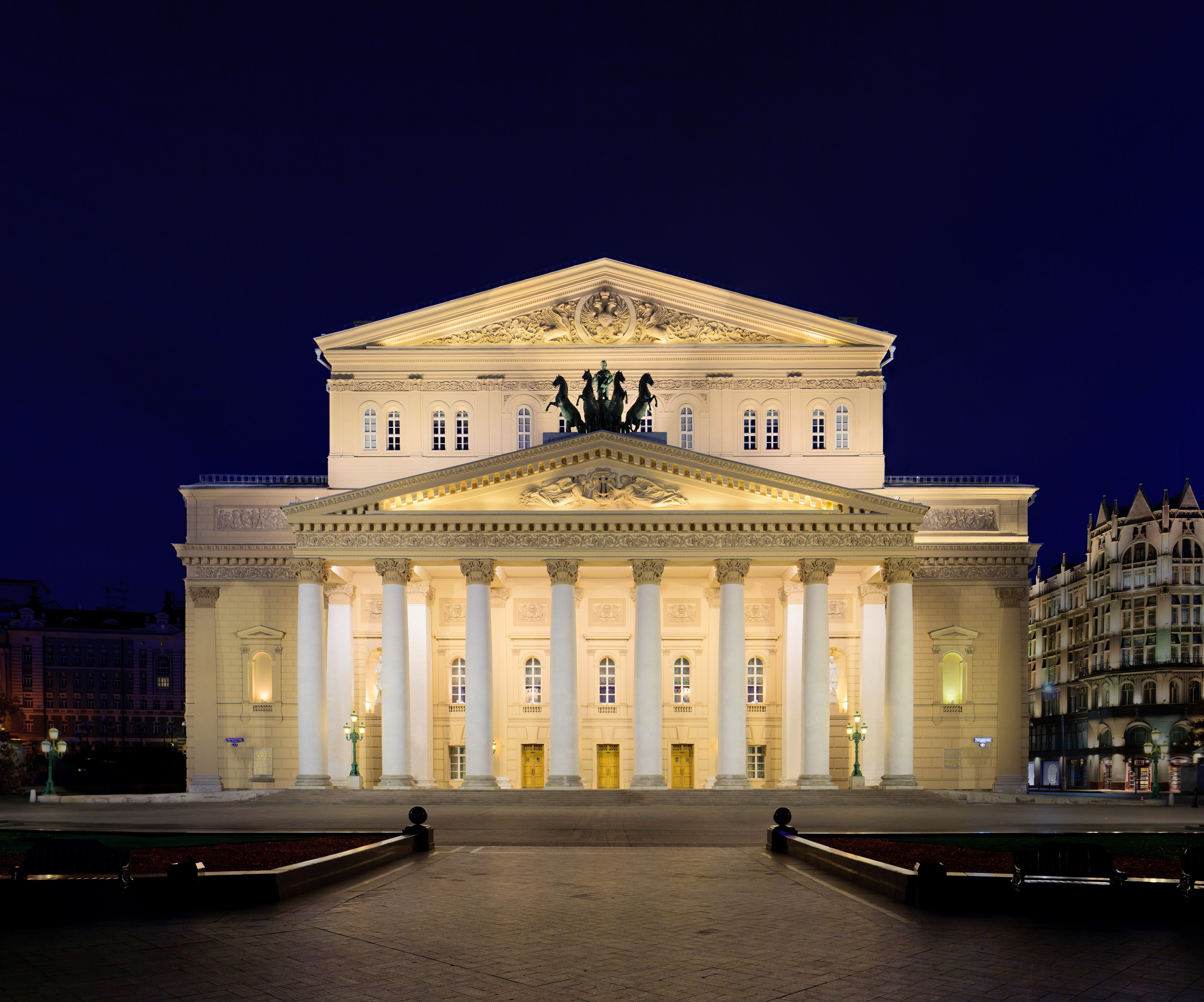
Teams checked in at the Pit Stop at the Bolshoi Theatre in Moscow, Russia.

- Episode 7: "Off to See the Wizard" (November 11, 2012)
- Prize: A trip for two to Maui, Hawaii (awarded to Trey & Lexi)

Locations

- Istanbul (Kuruçeşme Cemil Topuzlu Parkı – MV Savarona)
- Istanbul → Moscow, Russia
- Moscow (Zurab Tsereteli Sculpture Park)
- Moscow (Moskvoretsky Bridge)
- Moscow (Trud Sports Complex or Russian State Library)
- Moscow (Luzhkov Bridge (in Russian) – Trees of Love)
- Moscow (Bolshoi Theatre)

Episode summary

- At the start of this leg, teams were instructed to fly to Moscow, Russia. Once there, teams had to travel to the Zurab Tsereteli sculpture park, and then to the Moskvoretsky Bridge near the Kremlin, where they had to find two of Ivan the Terrible's guards, who gave them their next clue.
- This leg's Detour was a choice between Synchronized or Alphabetized. In Synchronized, teams had to correctly perform a synchronized swimming routine with six other swimmers from the Russian national team in order to receive their next clue. In Alphabetized, teams went to the Russian State Library and were given a list of books. They had to use the paper card catalog system, written in Cyrillic, to find the locations of four of the books on the list. A librarian then allowed them to search the aisles for the books, which they had to give to the head librarian in exchange for their next clue. For both Detour tasks, there was a time limit depending on the operating hours of each facility. If teams could not complete either task before the facilities closed, they would incur a four-hour penalty.
- After the Detour, teams had to travel to the Luzhkov Bridge in order to find their next clue.
- In this leg's Roadblock, one team member had to select one of the marked Trees of Love – trees covered in love locks – and unlock ten locks with a provided set of keys in order to free a ribbon from the tree that held their next clue: a 100 ruble banknote.
- Teams had to figure out that they had to head to the location on the reverse of the 100 ruble banknote in order to find the Pit Stop: the Bolshoi Theatre.

Additional notes

- This was a non-elimination leg.
- James & Abba were not allowed to check in at the Pit Stop since Abba's passport was among the items stolen by their taxicab driver during the Roadblock. However, as this was a non-elimination leg, they were allowed to continue racing until the time came that they would need their passports to travel.

=== Leg 8 (Russia) ===
For the Roadblock, racers had to take a quiz on the different time zones spanning Russia.

- Episode 8: "We Was Robbed" (November 18, 2012)
- Prize: A trip for two to Costa Rica (awarded to Jaymes & James)
- Eliminated: James & Abba

Locations

- Moscow (Bolshoi Theatre)
- Moscow (Moscow Timiryazev Agricultural Academy)
- Moscow (Hotel National)
- Moscow (Sokolniki Park – Tantsev Veranda)

Episode summary

- At the start of this leg, teams had to travel to the Moscow Timiryazev Agricultural Academy, where they found their next clue.
- In this leg's Roadblock, one team member was shown a brief slideshow showing a sample time in Moscow and a map of Russia's different time zones with their UTC offsets and Moscow's location highlighted. They were then shown multiple instances of the same time zone map without the UTC offsets, but with several other Russian cities highlighted. Afterwards, they had to fill in the corresponding local time for any of the five cities within an allotted time period. If they completed the quiz correctly and on time, they received their next clue. If they were incorrect or ran out of time, they had to watch the presentation again before being able to retake the quiz. Natalie & Nadiya used their Express Pass to bypass this Roadblock.
- For their Speed Bump, James & Abba had to help a Russian Orthodox priest get to his church via limousine. However, this task was not described by Phil on air because James & Abba had fallen so far behind the other teams by that point.
- This leg's Detour was a choice between Movers or Shakers. In Movers, teams had to dress as Russian soldiers and then correctly perform the steps of the Trepak dance in order to receive their next clue. In Shakers, teams attended a party where several impersonators of Russian historical figures were in attendance. They had to identify seven specific historical figures and correctly fill out a form in order to receive their next clue.
- After the Detour, teams had to check in at the Pit Stop: the Tantsev Veranda in Sokolniki Park.

Additional note

- Since they spent most of the leg trying to either retrieve Abba's passport or acquire a new one, James & Abba were only shown retrieving the Speed Bump clue and traveling to the task before arriving at the Pit Stop for elimination. Abba revealed in interviews that he completed the Roadblock, but that they did not perform the Detour as they were too far behind the other teams and instead went directly to the Pit Stop for elimination.

=== Leg 9 (Russia → Netherlands) ===
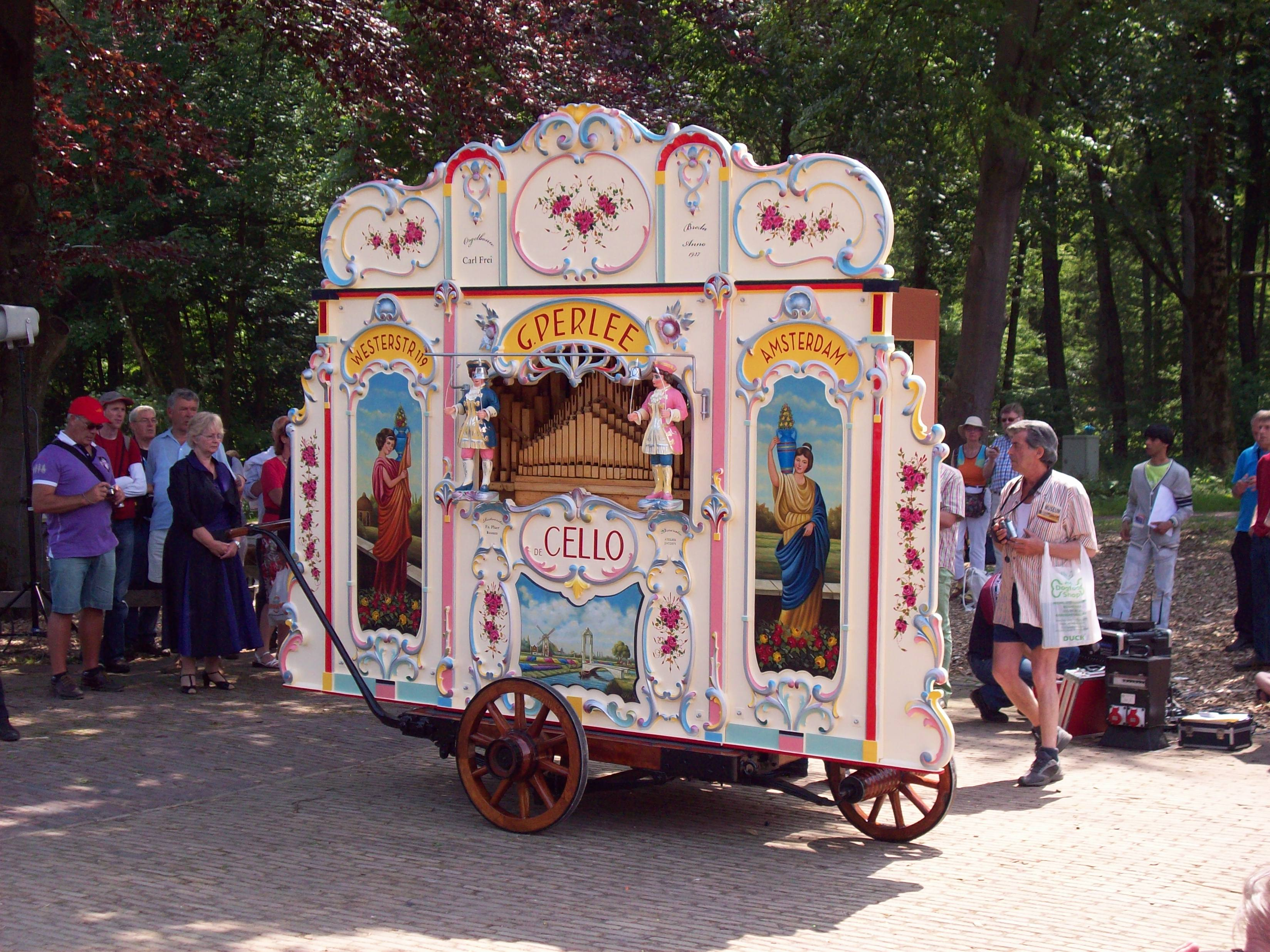
The Detour in Amsterdam had teams picking between running a Dutch street organ...

...or re-enacting Rembrandt's masterpiece The Night Watch.

- Episode 9: "Fishy Kiss" (November 25, 2012)
- Prize: US$5,000 each (awarded to Natalie & Nadiya)
- Eliminated: Abbie & Ryan

Locations

- Moscow (Swissôtel Krasnye Holmy)
- Moscow → Amsterdam, Netherlands
- Amsterdam (Amsterdam Centraal Railway Station)
- Amsterdam (Van Gogh Café – The Floating Dutchman)
- Amsterdam (Herenmarkt → Magere Brug – Pofertjesboot)
- Amsterdam (De Duif or Canal Bridges)
- Amsterdam (Museum Geelvinck)
- Ransdorp (Rural Village Field)
- Ransdorp (House of Rembrandt's Mistress)

Episode summary

- At the start of this leg, teams were simply given a flag and told to travel to the capital city of the country whose national flag they were given. They had to figure out that it was the flag of the Netherlands and their next destination was Amsterdam. Once there, teams had to take a train to the Amsterdam Centraal railway station, where they found their next clue.
- For this season's second Fast Forward, teams had to travel to the Van Gogh Café and board a marked amphibious bus called The Floating Dutchman. Once the bus entered the water, teams learned that each team member had to eat five soused herring before the bus returned to land. Natalie & Nadiya won the Fast Forward.
- Teams who chose to not attempt the Fast Forward had to travel to the Herenmarkt and board a boat that took them to a pofertjesboot, a floating poffertjes stand, near the Magere Brug, where they received their next clue and a serving of poffertjes.
- This leg's Detour was a choice between Back in Time or Organ to Grind. In Back in Time, teams had to re-create Rembrandt's painting The Night Watch using costumed actors and props, including themselves, in order to receive their next clue. In Organ to Grind, teams had to operate one of three Dutch street organs with one team member running the organ while the other asked for tips until they earned €30 in order to receive their next clue.
- After the Detour, teams had to travel to the Museum Geelvinck in order to find their next clue, which directed them had to travel by bus to Ransdorp. After 6:00 p.m., teams that were still racing were allowed to travel by taxi instead of by bus.
- The Roadblock was a Switchback from season 12, where one team member participated in the sport of fierljeppen. They had to vault across an irrigation ditch without hitting the water, retrieve their clue in the form of wooden clogs on the other side, and then vault back across.
- After the Roadblock, teams had to check in at the Pit Stop: the house of Rembrandt's mistress.

Additional note

- At the Double U-Turn, Jaymes & James chose to use the U-Turn on Abbie & Ryan. Trey & Lexi then used the second U-Turn on Jaymes & James, whom Trey & Lexi knew were ahead of them and were therefore unaffected, thereby preventing other teams from being able to use the second U-Turn.

=== Leg 10 (Netherlands → Spain) ===
After arriving on Mallorca, teams visited the Palma Cathedral, where they found a group of devils from the local La Nit del Foc festival.

- Episode 10: "Not a Well-Rounded Athlete" (December 2, 2012)
- Prize: A trip for two to the Riviera Maya in Mexico (awarded to Trey & Lexi)

Locations

- Ransdorp (House of Rembrandt's Mistress)
- Amsterdam → Barcelona, Spain
- Barcelona → Palma
- Palma (Palma Cathedral)
- Manacor (Centro de Alto Rendimiento)
- Campanet (Coves de Campanet (in Catalan))
- Sa Pobla (Windmill) or Muro (Plaza de Toros la Monumental)
- Palma (Bellver Castle)

Episode summary

- At the start of this leg, teams were instructed to fly to Barcelona, Spain. Once there, teams had to book an overnight ferry to Palma on the island of Mallorca. After docking in Palma, teams had to travel on foot to the Palma Cathedral, where they had to search amongst a small troupe of actors dressed as demons participating in a performance for La Nit del Foc, a traditional Mallorcan festival, for the one with their next clue. Teams were instructed to drive themselves to the Centro de Alto Rendimiento in order to find their next clue.
- In this leg's Roadblock, which paid tribute to Mallorcan tennis player Rafael Nadal, one team member had to return 20 tennis balls fired by an automatic server within the bounds of a clay court in order to receive their next clue. If the machine ran out of tennis balls, team members had to start over.
- After the Roadblock, teams had to drive to the Coves de Campanet, where they had to follow the music of two guitarists in the caves in order to receive their next clue.
- This leg's Detour was a choice between Spin It or Bull It. In Spin It, teams had to don safety gear and replace two blades on a 400-year-old Mallorcan windmill to the satisfaction of a mechanic before receiving their next clue. In Bull It, teams wore a special two-person bull outfit, with the person in front unable to see where they were going. The team member in back had to verbally guide their partner in the front to circle eight matadors and then strike a target within two minutes in order to receive their next clue.
- After the Detour, teams had to check in at the Pit Stop: Bellver Castle in Palma.

Additional note

- This was a non-elimination leg.

=== Leg 11 (Spain → France) ===
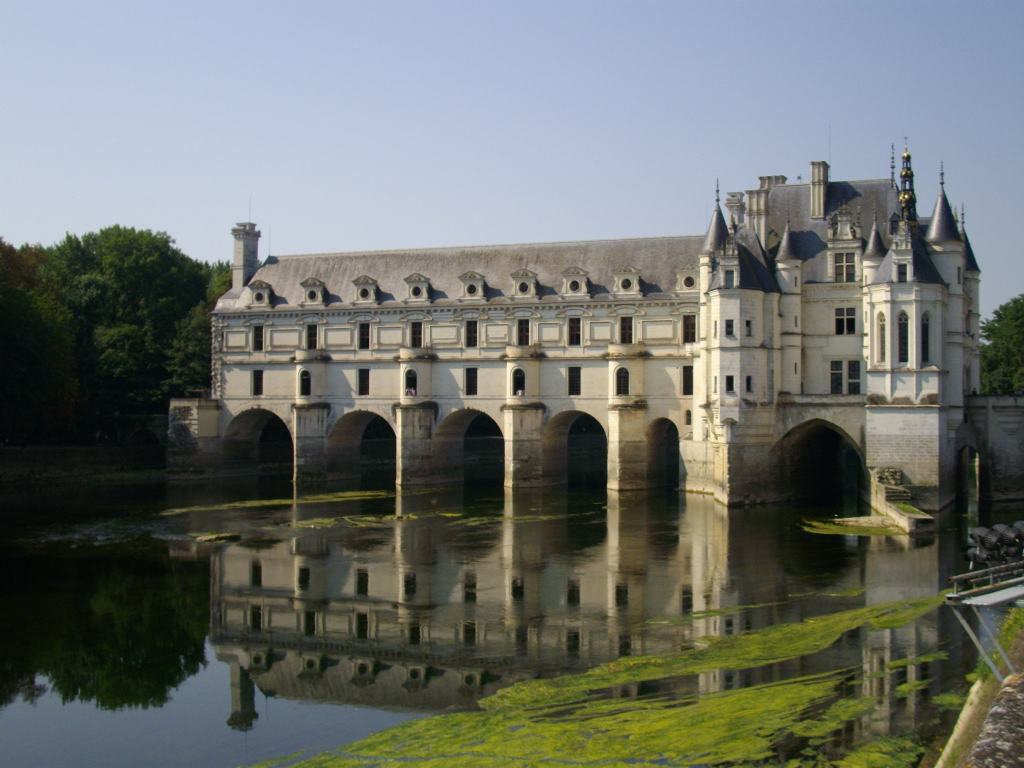
The Château de Chenonceau in the Loire Valley was the 11th Pit Stop of the race.

- Episode 11: "Take Down That Million" (December 9, 2012)
- Prize: A 2013 Ford Escape for each racer (awarded to Jaymes & James)
- Eliminated: Natalie & Nadiya

Locations

- Palma (Bellver Castle)
- Palma → Barcelona
- Barcelona → Saint-Pierre-des-Corps, France (Gare de Saint-Pierre-des-Corps)
- Villandry (Château de Villandry)
- Amboise (Château d'Amboise – Chapel of Saint-Hubert)
- Cheverny (Château de Cheverny)
- Bourré (La Cave des Roches)
- Chenonceaux (Château de Chenonceau)

Episode summary

- At the start of this leg, teams were instructed to fly back to Barcelona, and then travel by train to Saint-Pierre-des-Corps, France. Outside the train station in Saint-Pierre-des-Corps, teams were instructed to load eight empty baskets from a nearby restaurant into their vehicle before heading to the Château de Villandry. There, teams had to search the château's gardens for the statue of a stone dog, where they found their next clue and were instructed to find Leonardo da Vinci's grave. Teams had to figure out that this was at the chapel of the Château d'Amboise, where they found their next clue.
- For their Speed Bump, Natalie & Nadiya had to properly lace and tie up a lady's corset at the Château de Villandry before they could continue racing.
- This season's final Detour was a choice between Plow or Chow. In Plow, teams had to use a plow attached to a workhorse to till four straight furrows in a field in order to receive their next clue. In Chow, teams had to prepare a meal for a large pack of hunting dogs. They had to cut the meat into appropriate sizes, weigh out 20 kilograms (44 lb) of dog food, and then lay it out appropriately before the judge released the hounds and gave them their next clue.
- After the Detour, teams had to drive to La Cave des Roches in Bourré, where they found their next clue.
- In this leg's Roadblock, one team member had to memorize three types of mushrooms in a store display. Then, using one of the baskets they picked up at the train station, they had to enter a dimly-lit underground mushroom farm, find the same three types of mushrooms, and collect ten of each variety in order to receive their next clue.
- After the Roadblock, teams were directed to go to the Pit Stop at the "Castle of the Ladies", and had to figure out that this was the Château de Chenonceau.

=== Leg 12 (France → United States) ===
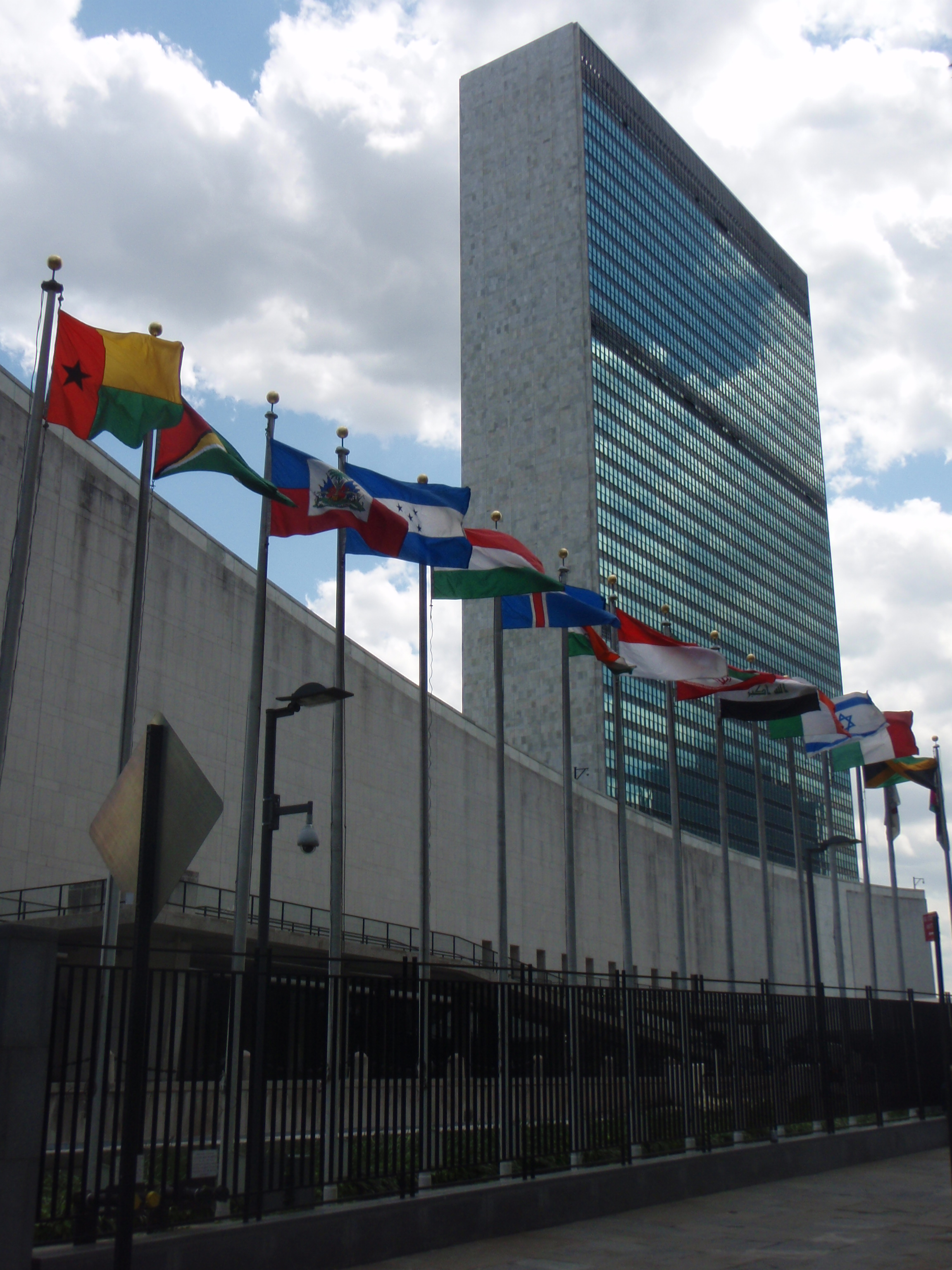
The season's final Roadblock took place inside the gates of the headquarters of the United Nations in New York City and had racers associating national flags with the different "hellos" and "goodbyes" they heard during the season.

- Episode 11: "Take Down That Million" (December 9, 2012)
- Prize: US$1,000,000
- Winners: Josh & Brent
- Runners-up: Jaymes & James
- Third place: Trey & Lexi

Locations

- Chenonceaux (Château de Chenonceau)
- Paris → New York City, New York
- New York City (Coney Island – Riegelmann Boardwalk)
- New York City (Brooklyn Navy Yard)
- New York City (Lombardi's Pizza)
- New York City (United Nations Headquarters)
- New York City (Gotham Hall)

Episode summary

- At the start of this leg, teams were instructed to fly to New York City and were given a postcard depicting a particular view at Coney Island in Brooklyn. There, teams had to find the exact location shown in the postcard, and their next clue was printed on advertisements nearby sending them to the Brooklyn Navy Yard.
- In this leg's first Roadblock, one team member was put into a straitjacket and bungee harness and hoisted upside down 15 stories above the Brooklyn Navy Yard. They then had to escape the bonds of the straitjacket, after which they were dropped in a surprise bungee drop. After being lowered to the ground, racers were given their next clue.
- After the first Roadblock, teams were instructed to find their next clue at the first pizzeria in New York: Lombardi's Pizza in Manhattan. There, teams had to deliver ten pizzas with various toppings to three different addresses in Little Italy without taking any notes. Once teams delivered all three orders, they were given a blue badge emblazoned with a logo, which they had to figure out was the logo for the United Nations and that their next clue was at the UN Headquarters.
- In this season's final Roadblock, the team member who did not perform the previous Roadblock had to attach the words for "hello" and "goodbye", as said to them by the Pit Stop greeters in their native languages, for the eight foreign countries visited during the race and raise them up the flagpole flying that country's flag. Once all of the flag sets were correct, racers could then hoist the flag of the United Nations, which also lowered their final clue and directed them to the finish line at Gotham Hall.

Country	Language	Hello	Goodbye
China	Mandarin	Nǐ hǎo (您好)	Zài jiàn (再见)
Indonesia	Indonesian	Hai	Selamat tinggal
Bangladesh	Bengali	Shagotom (স্বাগতম)	Aabar dekha hobe (আবার দেখা হবে)
Turkey	Turkish	Merhaba	Hoşça kal
Russia	Russian	Zdrávstvujtye (Здраствуйте)	Do svidániya (До Свидания)
Netherlands	Dutch	Hallo	Tot ziens
Spain	Spanish	Hola	Adiós
France	French	Bonjour	Au revoir

Additional note

- Legs 11 and 12 aired back-to-back as a special two-hour episode.

== Reception ==
=== Critical response ===
The Amazing Race 21 received mixed reviews. Daniel Fienberg of HitFix wrote that "it was a decent season. There were some good challenges in some good cities and as we got to the Final Four, I had at least one team I was rooting for and at least one team I was rooting against" but said that the cast wasn't the strongest, saying that looking "back at the six teams that were eliminated first and that's a lot of filler". Carrie Milburn of Reality Nation called the story arc of this season's winners inspiring. Daron Aldridge of Box Office Prophets wrote that this season left a lot to be desired. Michael Hewitt of the Orange County Register called this season's ending "the biggest upset in 'TAR' history, but that upset meant two stronger and more likable teams were shut out of the prize money." In 2016, this season was ranked 23rd out of the first 27 seasons by the Rob Has a Podcast Amazing Race correspondents. In 2024, Rhenn Taguiam of Game Rant placed this season within the bottom 13 out of 36.

=== Ratings ===
U.S. Nielsen ratings

#	Airdate	Episode	Rating	Share	Rating/Share	Viewers	Rank	Rank	Rank	Rank
#	Airdate	Episode	Households		18–49	(millions)	Timeslot (Viewers)	Timeslot (18–49)	Week (Viewers)	Week (18–49)
1	September 30, 2012	"Double Your Money"	6.0	9	2.5/6	9.40	3	3	30	< 25
2	October 7, 2012	"Long Hair, Don't Care"	5.8	8	2.6/6	9.66	2	3	21	< 25
3	October 14, 2012	"There's No Crying in Baseball"	5.7	9	2.6/7	9.11	3	3	28	< 25
4	October 21, 2012	"Funky Monkey"	6.0	9	2.6/5	9.54	2	3	22	22
5	October 28, 2012	"Chill Out, Freak"	5.6	9	2.5/6	9.41	4	4	< 25	< 25
6	November 4, 2012	"Get Your Sexy On"	6.3	9	2.6/6	10.20	2	3	22	22
7	November 11, 2012	"Off to See the Wizard"	5.7	8	2.5/6	9.18	2	4	21	25
8	November 18, 2012	"We Was Robbed"	6.1	9	2.4/6	9.59	2	4	22	25
9	November 25, 2012	"Fishy Kiss"	6.0	9	2.5/6	9.58	2	4	18	19
10	December 2, 2012	"Not a Well-Rounded Athlete"	6.2	9	2.7/6	10.02	2	3	22	25
11	December 9, 2012	"Take Down That Million"	5.7	9	2.6/6	9.35	2	3	20	22

- Episode 8, "We Was Robbed", went up against the 2012 American Music Awards.
- The season 21 finale was down 31% from the season 19 fall finale on December 11, 2011. It tied as the show's lowest rated finale ever.

Canadian ratings

Canadian broadcaster CTV also aired The Amazing Race on Sundays. Episodes aired at 8:00 p.m. Eastern and Central (9:00 p.m. Pacific, Mountain and Atlantic).

#	Airdate	Episode	Viewers (millions)	Rank (Week)
1	September 30, 2012	"Double Your Money"	2.63	4
2	October 7, 2012	"Long Hair, Don't Care"	1.78	9
3	October 14, 2012	"There's No Crying in Baseball"	2.67	2
4	October 21, 2012	"Funky Monkey"	2.65	3
5	October 28, 2012	"Chill Out, Freak"	2.73	3
6	November 4, 2012	"Get Your Sexy On"	2.65	3
7	November 11, 2012	"Off to See the Wizard"	2.54	3
8	November 18, 2012	"We Was Robbed"	2.26	3
9	November 25, 2012	"Fishy Kiss"	2.06	9
10	December 2, 2012	"Not a Well-Rounded Athlete"	2.56	2
11	December 9, 2012	"Take Down That Million"	2.53	3

- Episode 2, "Long Hair, Don't Care", aired on the Sunday before Canadian Thanksgiving Day.
- Episode 9, "Fishy Kiss", aired on the day of the 100th Grey Cup.
