= Brent Ridge =

American physician, businessman and reality TV participant

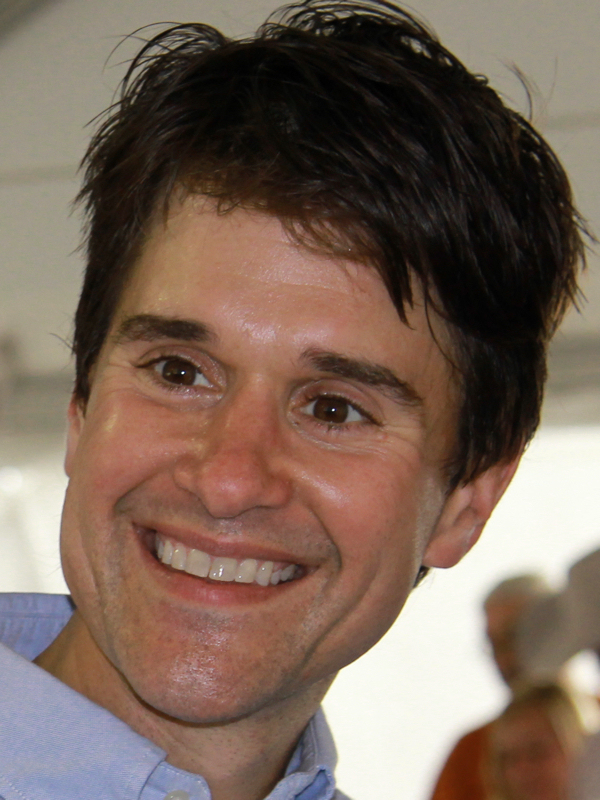
- Ridge in 2011
- Born: May 10, 1973 (age 53)
- Occupations: Physician; Businessperson; Farmer
- Known for: The Fabulous Beekman Boys
- Spouse: Josh Kilmer-Purcell (m. 2013)

Brent Ridge is an American physician, business owner, and reality television participant. He was formerly the Vice President of Healthy Living for Martha Stewart Omnimedia.

Together with his partner Josh Kilmer-Purcell, Ridge bought in 2007 a 19th-century farm, Beekman Mansion, located in Sharon Springs, New York. The couple launched a business, Beekman 1802, selling products derived from produce raised on the farm.

In 2010, Ridge and Kilmer-Purcell became the stars of The Fabulous Beekman Boys, a reality television series on Planet Green that follows their lives as they work to develop the Beekman brand to the point where they can live at the farm full-time. In 2012, CBS announced that Ridge and Purcell had been cast in the 21st season of The Amazing Race, ultimately becoming the season's grand prize winners.

== Early life ==
Ridge grew up in Randleman, NC. He graduated from the University of North Carolina at Chapel Hill with a B.S in Public Health.

He was accepted into the University of North Carolina School of Medicine as part of the Early Acceptance Program. During medical school, he was awarded fellowships to study universal health care in England as well as a grant from the American Federation of Aging Research which enabled him to work on the New England Centenarian Project at Harvard University.

After medical school, he completed a residency in Internal Medicine at Columbia University and a fellowship in geriatric medicine at Mount Sinai School of Medicine in New York City.

== Career ==
After completing his fellowship, he was offered the position of Assistant Professor of Clinical Medicine at Mount Sinai School of Medicine in New York City. He was responsible for clinical care as well as medical student education. He was also the Director of the hospital's ACE (Acute Care of the Elderly) inpatient unit.

In 2005, he matriculated at the New York University Stern School of Business and received an MBA.

He returned to Mount Sinai with the title of Director of Clinical Strategy.

He was responsible for working with the famed architect I. M. Pei to design a new center for the care of older adults at Mount Sinai School of Medicine. Once the design was complete, he wrote Martha Stewart a letter while she was incarcerated asking her to consider becoming the benefactor of the new center. The Martha Stewart Center for Living was dedicated to Martha Stewart's mother, Martha Kostyra and is now one of the largest centers for the care of older adults in the world.

Martha Stewart subsequently wrote about his entrepreneurial drive in her book, The Martha Rules.

=== Later career ===
After opening the Center for Living, Ridge was asked to join Martha Stewart Living Omnimedia as the Vice President for Healthy Living, a new core area of the company devoted to health and wellness, working on developing healthy living initiatives across the companies media and merchandise divisions

In 2008, he was laid off from the company, but remains friends with Stewart who has appeared in several episodes of The Fabulous Beekman Boys.

In 2010, Epicurious.com named Ridge and his partner, Josh Kilmer-Purcell, among others as "The next Martha Stewarts".

In 2012, Josh and Ridge competed on Season 21 of CBS's The Amazing Race. The couple were considered underdogs for most of the season, finishing next to last in six out of the last seven legs before ultimately winning the final leg and the $1 million grand prize. The prize enabled Josh to quit his job in NYC and move to the farm with Ridge full-time.

=== Beekman 1802 ===
After losing his job at MSO during the recession of 2008, Ridge moved to a weekend property he had purchased in Sharon Springs, NY, and launched Beekman 1802, a lifestyle company devoted to seasonal living.

The company produces a wide range of products in the beauty, gourmet foods, home décor and gardening areas. They have had business relationships with retailers such as Anthropologie, Henri Bendel, Williams Sonoma, John Derian, ABC Carpet, Home, and others.

NASDAQ has called Beekman 1802 "one of the fastest growing lifestyle brands in the United States"

The launch of the company was documented in the docu-series, The Fabulous Beekman Boys, which aired for 2 seasons on Discovery Communication's Planet Green channel. When that channel folded, the show was purchased by Scripps and can be seen on The Cooking Channel.

The original Beekman 1802 Mercantile on Main Street in Sharon Springs, NY, can still be visited and Ridge can often be seen in the shop when he is not traveling.

In 2011, The Beekman 1802 Heirloom Cookbook, was published by Sterling Epicure. Ridge and Josh subsequently signed a multi-book deal with Rodale. The Beekman 1802 Heirloom Desserts was published in September 2013.

=== Academia ===
In the spring of 2014, Ridge accepted an adjunct faculty position at the State University of New York at Cobleskill. He teaches marketing in the School of Business.

== Personal life ==
Ridge met his husband, Josh Kilmer-Purcell, in 2000 on a website. Josh was the first man that Ridge had ever dated. They were engaged in December 2011. The couple married June 28, 2013.
