= The Fabulous Beekman Boys =

American reality TV series

- Title card
- Genre: Reality
- Starring: Josh Kilmer-Purcell; Brent Ridge; John Hall
- Country of origin: United States
- Original language: English
- No. of seasons: 2
- No. of episodes: 21

Production
- Production location: Sharon Springs, New York
- Running time: 23 minutes
- Production company: World of Wonder

Original release
- Network: Planet Green
- Release: June 16, 2010 – May 17, 2011

The Fabulous Beekman Boys is a reality television show produced in the United States by World of Wonder Productions. The series followed Josh Kilmer-Purcell and his husband Brent Ridge as they learned how to become farmers and launch their lifestyle brand, Beekman 1802. Brent, a physician who previously worked for Martha Stewart Omnimedia, lives at the farm full-time, while Josh, a New York Times bestselling author, commutes from their apartment in New York City on the weekends. The show originally aired on Planet Green, one of the Discovery Networks, but was acquired by Cooking Channel, a network owned by Scripps Network Interactive in 2012.

Touted as a "gay Green Acres", the series chronicled the couple's trials and tribulations as novice farmers, aided by their caretaker and resident farmer John Hall, or "Farmer John." Hall brought his goats to the Beekman Farm shortly after Ridge and Kilmer-Purcell purchased it in 2007. Also featured is Polka Spot, the farm's llama. Other residents of Sharon Springs, New York are also included in the cast, including Doug Plummer and Garth Roberts, owners of the American Hotel.

On August 9, 2010, Planet Green announced that The Fabulous Beekman Boys had been renewed for a second season of ten episodes. In announcing the renewal, Laura Michalchyshyn, President and General Manager of Planet Green, noted that the series "has quickly established itself as a cornerstone franchise for Planet Green". The second season began on March 22, 2011.

Planet Green declined to renew The Fabulous Beekman Boys for a third season based on low ratings. However, Cooking Channel announced in April 2012 that it had picked up the series for a third season, although it still remained unknown as of 2023. The channel plans to repeat the first two seasons with additional footage as well. The pair also participated as a team on the 21st season of The Amazing Race.

== Overview ==
Season one follows what Josh and Brent call the "year of sacrifice" with Brent living full-time at the farm while Josh works in the city during the week and commutes to the farm on weekends. The season follows the couple's attempts to build their brand, including attaining wider exposure for their goat milk soaps and cheeses, and to deal with the stress that the long separation puts on their relationship. The season closes with the opening of their first store, the couple's celebration of their tenth anniversary and their agreement to extend the "year of sacrifice".

Season two opens with Josh's growing increasingly frustrated over deferring his dream to be a full-time farmer and the couple's setting a goal of generating one million dollars in revenue to allow Josh to move to Beekman Farm permanently. The supporting cast expands with the introduction of three Beekman 1802 employees: Stephane the comptroller; Megan, chief operating officer; and Maria, the director of resources.

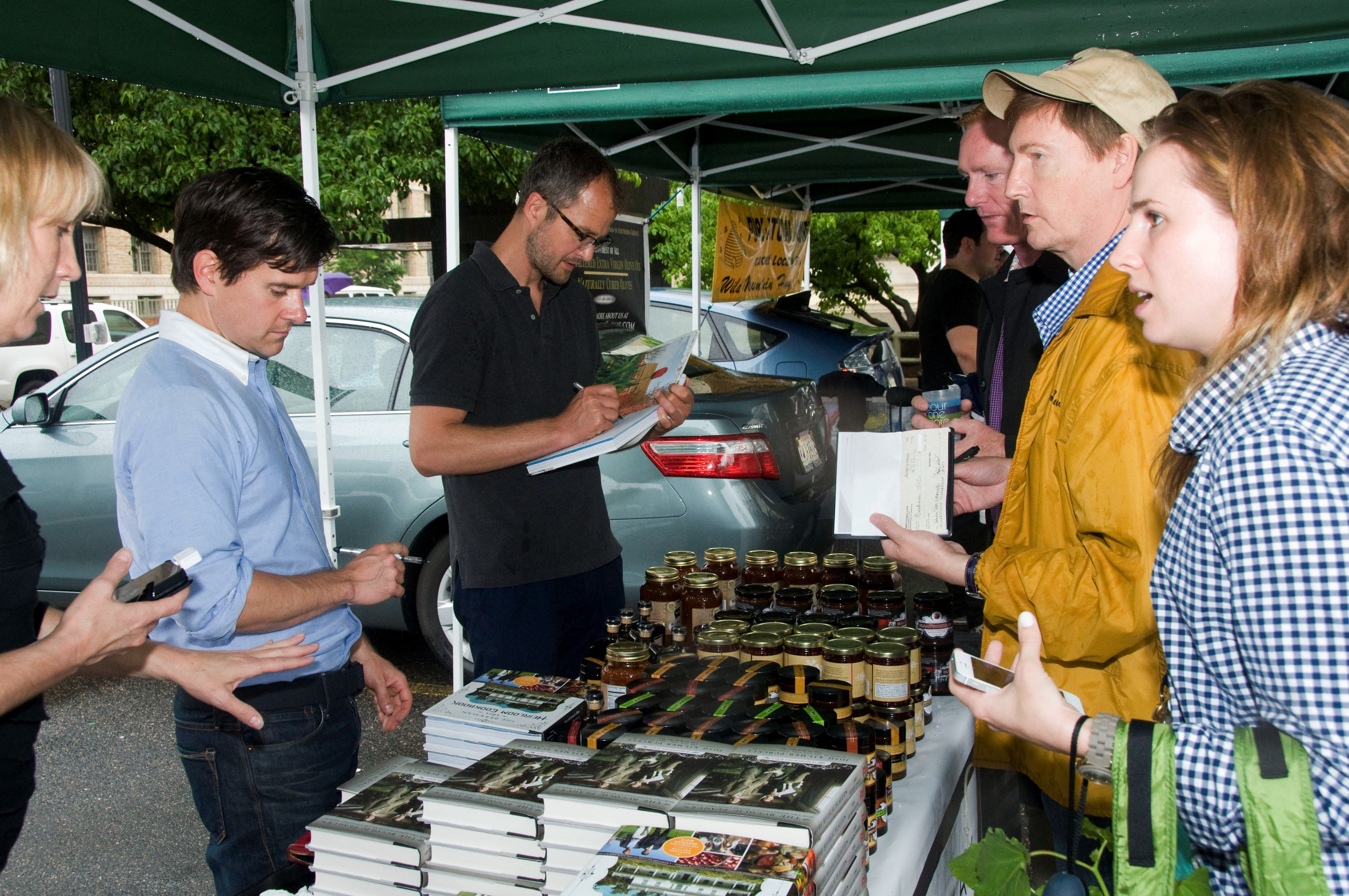
Book signing at a Farmers Market

== Episodes ==
=== Season one ===
Title	Original air date	Synopsis
"When Pigs Fly"	June 16, 2010	Josh and Brent work the farm with the help of Farmer John, adding pigs to the range of animals they are raising. Josh wants to let the "pigs be pigs" and let them wallow, but Brent wants everything to be perfect. Josh is hurt when Brent declines to come to the city for Josh's first reading from his new book. The couple clash over the strain being apart during the week and working all weekend puts on their relationship.
"Beekmanpalooza"	June 16, 2010	Brent organizes the first Harvest Weekend to draw attention to Sharon Springs and the variety of local produce available from area farmers. The three-day event includes a garden party, a harvest festival and a gourmet meal prepared from local ingredients. Josh is dismayed when Brent makes him dress in a colonial-era costume for the debut of the farm's new goat milk cheese.
"Unhappy Birthday"	June 23, 2010	Josh is upset that Brent booked the farm for a wedding the same weekend as Josh's 40th birthday. Rain threatens to wash out the wedding but at the last moment the skies clear and the wedding is a success. The boys find the occasion bittersweet as they had always thought theirs would be the first wedding at Beekman Farm. Brent throws Josh a birthday party and later surprises him with a dining room table that Josh had designed years earlier and Brent has built.
"Suds & Studs"	June 30, 2010	Breeding season leaves Brent and Farmer John dealing with a herd of horny goats. Meanwhile, Brent struggles to fill an order for 14,000 bars of soap. He finishes with help from Doug, Garth and friend Michelle and a surprise assist from Josh.
"Bringing Home the Bacon"	July 7, 2010	Brent and Josh have their pigs, Porky and Bess, slaughtered and discuss how grateful they are for their "sacrifice." While Brent promotes Beekman 1802 at a cheese event by Martha Stewart, Josh spends the week at the farm to help him "connect" to it. The boys have their first meal made from their slaughtered pigs and ponder whether to raise pigs again next season.
"The Haunting of Beekman Farm"	July 15, 2010	It is halfway through the year that Brent and Josh have dedicated to establishing the Beekman 1802 brand and they are worried about the strain running the farm is putting on their relationship. The boys carve turnips into jack-o'-lanterns for Halloween with their goth neighbors Kat and Douglas, who discuss "Mary," a ghost who allegedly haunts the Beekman house. Brent and Josh call in the North East Paranormal Society for a consultation. The boys attend a fundraiser for the medical center founded by Brent and Martha Stewart; after, they express their relationship concerns. On Halloween night, the ghost hunters return and claim to find evidence of spirits.
"Turkey a la Queens"	July 22, 2010	Thanksgiving at the Beekman brings visits from Josh's parents and Brent's mother, triggering Brent's anxiety that he is a disappointment to her because he's gay. Brent and Josh differ over the meaning of Thanksgiving, with Brent focusing on family and Josh working to make the perfect meal. Farmer John, Doug, Garth and Michelle join the family to share the meal.
"Three Men and a Baby Goat"	July 29, 2010	Following hip replacement surgery, Farmer John returns to the Beekman to convalesce. After a day under Brent's care John calls his boyfriend to take him away. In his absence the boys have trouble handling the herd. With goat birthing imminent, John returns to assist with difficult births.
"Le Grand Fromage"	August 4, 2010	Josh stresses over creating sample cheese dishes for possible inclusion on the menu of chef Jean-Georges Vongerichten's new restaurant. Farmer John tries to come up with names for all of the new baby goats but won't let Josh help until he learns all the goat breeds. Jean-Georges is impressed by Josh's dishes and agrees to put the cheese on his menu.
"Trouble in Store"	August 11, 2010	Without consulting Josh, Brent signs a two-year lease on a store in Sharon Springs to sell Beekman 1802 merchandise. He takes time off from opening preparations to surprise Josh in the city for their tenth anniversary. Josh grants Brent an extension on their "year of sacrifice" but warns him that it is not indefinite. At the grand opening, Brent and Josh are gratified that the people of the village come to support them.

Title	Original air date	Synopsis
"The Fabulous Beekman Boys' Holiday Special"	December 8, 2010	Josh and Brent host a one-hour retrospective of season one, including the top five viewer-selected favorite moments and never before seen footage. The boys answer viewer questions and offer a preview of season two.

=== Season two ===
Title	Original air date	Synopsis
"Llama Drama"	March 22, 2011	Farmer John decides that he can quit his day job and work full-time at the farm. Josh is irritated since he feels that he is stuck working 60- to 80-hour weeks in the city while everyone else is living his dream of being a full-time farmer. Polka Spot frustrates Brent when she repeatedly jumps the pasture fence. Josh expects him to solve the problem without spending any money or else get rid of the llama. Despite Josh's wishes, Brent and John buy a tall electric fence to keep Polka Spot penned in since she's "part of the family." Brent and Josh set a goal of earning one million dollars from the Beekman brand to allow Josh to quit his job.
"Black Sheep of the Family"	March 22, 2011	Josh is pleased when Brent offers to plan a road trip, only to learn to his dismay that it's a working vacation to pick up sheep for their and Martha Stewart's farms. Brent hires two locals to cover the store but frustrates them with his micro-management. The couple fly to Brent's home state of North Carolina, pick up four Black Welsh Mountain sheep and begin the drive back. When Josh realizes they are only a short drive from Brent's family he suggests they visit, only for Brent to insist they don't have time. Josh accuses Brent of not wanting him to meet Brent's family, but Brent advises that it's his family who doesn't want to meet Josh. The couple spends the night at a bed and breakfast and sneak the sheep into the room under a liberal interpretation of the "pets welcome" policy.
"A Martha Makeover"	March 29, 2011	The boys continue their road trip, dropping off the lambs at Martha Stewart's Bedford estate. Martha's barn inspires Brent to hold a "barn raising" at Beekman Farm, really a barn repairing and painting. Friends and neighbors drop by to help with the work and the boys thank them with a communal dinner.
"Food and Whine"	April 5, 2011	Brent works to expand the Beekman product line by developing a spicy cajeta and preparing the farm for a photoshoot with Food & Wine magazine. Josh is offered a new opportunity at work which will require him to be away from the farm for weeks at a time and may require a future relocation to San Diego. The photoshoot goes well, culminating in a banquet with the boys and some of the village merchants. Brent has a tasting with chef Marcus Samuelsson and decides the new cajeta is ready to go into production.
"Store Wars"	April 12, 2011	Brent and Josh each have a promotional event and they compete with each other to see whose will be more successful. Brent debuts a new product, "Milk Shake" brand bath soak, at the Vogue magazine "Fashion Night Out" and makes Josh serve real milk shakes to the crowd. Josh does a cooking demonstration at Bloomingdale's department store and sells his new book and farm products. Josh sells out of product but Brent still declares victory. Back at the farm Brent surprises Josh by telling him that Brent's grandmother requested a copy of Josh's book. Brent calls her and Josh and she speak for the first time.
"Beekmanpalooza Redux"	April 19, 2011	The village of Sharon Springs gears up for the second annual Harvest Festival and the boys are excited when Rosie O'Donnell emails that she plans to attend. Everyone at the store is worried that they may not have enough inventory but Brent is unconcerned. The Harvest Feast goes well and Brent and Josh actually get to eat at this one, unlike last year. They promise not to argue during the Festival weekend. While Brent minds the store, Josh, Farmer John and his boyfriend Jason give farm tours. Everyone is pleased that the Festival is again a success.
"Recipe for Disaster"	April 26, 2011	Brent formulates the idea of an "heirloom recipes" cookbook and Josh insists on being in charge of the project. When a publisher suggests changing "heirloom" to "heritage", Brent struggles with his decision to give up creative control of the project. In conjunction with Sotheby's, Brent coordinates an auction of heirloom vegetables to benefit small farms. Resource director Maria's reluctance to confront her friend Deb, the Beekman's soap maker, leads to a shuffling of business responsibilities and Megan's bid to be given more control at the store.
"Beek-Men Boys"	May 3, 2011	Josh's parents, Dave and Jackie, come from Wisconsin for a visit. Jackie spends the week in the city with Josh while Dave and Brent work on the farm. Dave's presence leads Brent to reflect on his growing up without a father figure, having lost his father at age 10. Josh's parents separately ask the boys if they have given any thought to becoming parents themselves. They have but both feel the time is not right.
"Blaak Friday"	May 10, 2011	In hopes of meeting their million dollar goal, Brent and Josh organize Sharon Springs's first Victorian Festival. While it is successful it doesn't bring in as much revenue as they had hoped. Josh and Jason plan a surprise party for Farmer John's birthday. Brent's secretive nature regarding how near the boys are to the million dollar goal begins stressing Josh. When Brent finally tells him he doesn't think they will make it, Josh wonders whether keeping the farm is still a good idea.
"Paging Dr. Brent"	May 17, 2011	When newly arrived couple Susan & Yvonne buy a property in Sharon Springs to transform into an assisted living facility, they ask Brent to be their resident physician. Brent is reluctant to take any time away from the business, but with Josh growing increasingly dissatisfied with their arrangement Brent agrees to take on a part-time position to allow Josh to spend more time at the farm. Birthing season brings sadness for Farmer John when Dolly, his oldest milking goat, dies shortly after birthing her kid.

== Critical response ==
The New York Times finds the show "less fabulous" than 1960s sitcom Green Acres, citing its emphasis on arguments between the couple (Brent & Josh) over "fish-out-of-water rural humor". The Times concludes that "the audience that fiercely defends all things purporting to be fabulous" will enjoy the series' "moments of sylvan burlesque".

Salon.com found Brent and Josh to be "uniquely charming" and the show a "voyeuristic treat".
