= Josh Kilmer-Purcell =

American writer, businessperson, and television personality (born 1969)

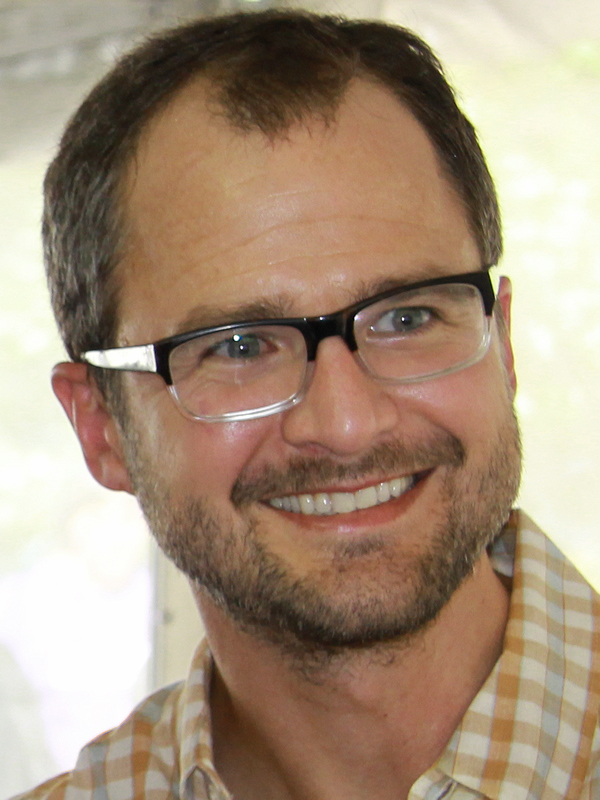
- Kilmer-Purcell in 2011
- Born: Joshua Gordon Kilmer; August 28, 1969 (age 57); Albany, New York, U.S.
- Education: Michigan State University (BA)
- Occupations: Writer; television personality; businessperson
- Spouse: Brent Ridge (m. 2013)
- Writing career
- Period: 2006–present
- Notable works: I Am Not Myself These Days: A Memoir; Candy Everybody Wants; The Bucolic Plague

Josh Kilmer-Purcell (born August 28, 1969) is an American writer, businessperson, and television personality. In addition to his New York Times and National Bestselling memoirs, his life has been documented in the television reality show The Fabulous Beekman Boys with his husband, Brent Ridge. He has written articles for NPR, Huffington Post, Publishers Weekly, AdWeek, OUT Magazine & others. The pair also participated in the 21st season of The Amazing Race, ultimately becoming the season's grand prize winners.

== Television ==
In 2010, Discovery Network's Planet Green channel debuted a reality television series about Kilmer-Purcell and Ridge, titled The Fabulous Beekman Boys. The series documents their relationship and lives as farmers in upstate New York as they build a green lifestyle company together. The President and General Manager of Planet Green declared it the "No. 1 original series" on the network. In 2012, Cooking Channel acquired rights to the program, and began airing the second season.

On March 10, 2010, Bravo television network announced a development deal with Darren Star to produce I Am Not Myself These Days as a scripted television series based on Kilmer-Purcell's bestselling memoir of the same name.

On October 1, 2012 the fabulous Beekman boys competed on season 21 of the Amazing Race, ultimately finishing in first place and winning the grand prize in the season finale in New York City.

== Writer ==
Kilmer-Purcell has written or co-written six books, including two bestselling memoirs, a novel, and four cookbooks.

I Am Not Myself These Days: A Memoir, Harper Perennial, 2006, Memoir. Kilmer-Purcell's first memoir is a tragicomic account of his early days in New York City, living as an advertising art director by day and a drag queen named "Aquadisiac" (or "Aqua") by night. The memoir details his relationship with a crack-addicted male escort named "Jack", and was a New York Times bestseller in the spring of 2006.

Candy Everybody Wants, Harper Perennial, 2008, Novel.

The Bucolic Plague, HarperCollins, 2010, Memoir. Kilmer-Purcell's second memoir recounts his purchase of a historic mansion and goat farm in Sharon Springs, New York, and quickly became a national bestseller.

Kilmer-Purcell has also co-authored three Beekman 1802 cookbooks with Brent Ridge and Sandy Gluck.

From 2006-2009 Kilmer-Purcell wrote a monthly column about urban gay life for Out magazine. He has contributed to national media outlets including The Advocate, Huffington Post, and National Public Radio.

== Biography ==
Kilmer-Purcell (born "Joshua Gordon Kilmer") was born in Albany, New York, and was raised in Oconomowoc, Wisconsin. He attended high school in Mansfield, Massachusetts and attended Michigan State University, where he studied creative writing with the poet Diane Wakoski. He received a BA in English Literature in 1991. He added his stepfather's surname "Purcell" in 1990. He met husband Brent Ridge in New York City in 2000.

Kilmer-Purcell has worked at several Manhattan advertising agencies, including Kirshenbaum Bond & Partners, Merkley Newman Harty, TBWA\Chiat Day, SS+K, & JWT. It is widely believed that the events in I Am Not Myself These Days: A Memoir took place while he was working at Merkley Newman Harty.

As his drag queen alter ego "Aqua" (short for "Aquadisiac"), Kilmer-Purcell performed at nightclubs in New York City, Atlanta, Los Angeles, Philadelphia, and Tokyo. Aqua was best known for her use of live goldfish in the breasts of her costumes. People for the Ethical Treatment of Animals (PETA) sent a letter of protest to Kilmer-Purcell condemning the use of live animals in his shows.

In 2008 Kilmer-Purcell and Ridge launched Beekman 1802, a lifestyle company inspired by their farm in Sharon Springs, New York. In 2015 the company ranked #1112 on the Top 2000 Fastest Growing Private Companies in America by Inc Magazine, and has been called "one of the fastest growing lifestyle brands in America" by Nasdaq. In 2015, Beekman 1802 launched a magazine titles "The Beekman 1802 Magazine" with Meredith Publications. Beekman 1802 is the third largest brand on the American television retail channel Evine. The brand is also present on Canadian and European shopping channels. Kilmer-Purcell and Ridge often appear on the channels as company spokespersons.

== Personal ==
Kilmer-Purcell is openly gay, and with his husband, Dr. Brent Ridge, a physician at Mount Sinai Hospital who was the vice president of healthy living at Martha Stewart Omnimedia, have been together since 2000. Their engagement was announced in December 2011. The couple married on June 28, 2013.

== Filmography ==
=== Television ===
- 2010: The Fabulous Beekman Boys
- 2011: NewNowNext Awards
- 2011: Tori & Dean: Home Sweet Hollywood
- 2012: the Amazing Race 21

=== Film ===
- 2011: Making the Boys as Himself

== Bibliography ==
=== Books ===
- The Beekman 1802 Heirloom Vegetable Cookbook. Rodale. 2014.
- The Beekman 1802 Heirloom Dessert Cookbook. Rodale. 2013.
- The Beekman 1802 Heirloom Cookbook. Sterling. 2012.
- The Bucolic Plague. Harper. 2010. ISBN 9780061336980.
- Candy Everybody Wants. Harper Perennial. 2008. ISBN 9780061336966.
- I Am Not Myself These Days: A Memoir. Harper Perennial. 2006. ISBN 9780060817329.

=== Anthology ===
- Michael Taeckens, ed. (2009). Love Is a Four-Letter Word: True Stories of Breakups, Bad Relationships, and Broken Hearts. Plume. ISBN 9780452295506.
- Larry Smith and Rachel Fershleiser, ed. (2008). Not Quite What I Was Planning, Revised and Expanded Deluxe Edition: Six-Word Memoirs by Writers Famous and Obscure. Harper.
- Richard LabontÃ and Lawrence Schimel, ed. (2007). First Person Queer: Who We Are (So Far). Arsenal Pulp Press. ISBN 9781551522272.
