= Sharon Springs, New York =

- Village
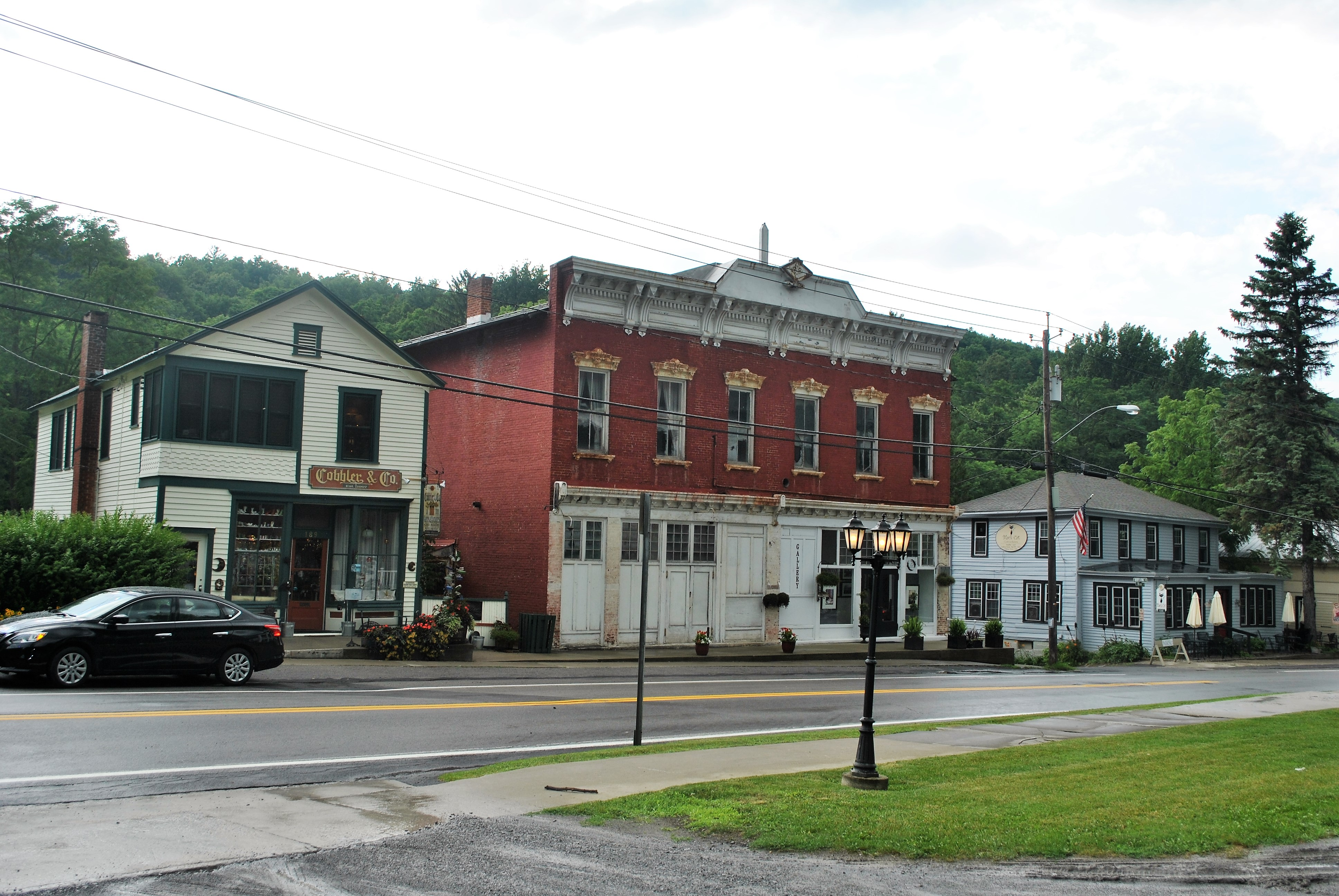

- Location within the state of New York
- Coordinates: 42°47′41″N 74°36′57″W
- Country: United States
- State: New York
- County: Schoharie

Government
  - Mayor: Denise Kelly

Area
  - Total: 1.83 sq mi (4.73 km^{2})
  - Land: 1.83 sq mi (4.73 km^{2})
  - Water: 0 sq mi (0.00 km^{2})
- Elevation: 1,102 ft (336 m)

Population (2020)
  - Total: 483
  - Density: 264.4/sq mi (102.09/km^{2})
  - Honorary: 720
- Time zone: UTC-5 (Eastern (EST))
  - Summer (DST): UTC-4 (EDT)
- ZIP code: 13459
- Area code: 518
- FIPS code: 36-66663
- GNIS feature ID: 0964946

Sharon Springs is a village in Schoharie County, New York, United States. As of the 2020 census, Sharon Springs had a population of 483. Its name derives from the hometown of the first colonial settlers, Sharon, Connecticut, and the important springs in the village. Likewise, Sharon Springs, Kansas was settled by former residents of this upstate New York village.

The village of Sharon Springs sits in the northwestern part of Schoharie County in the town of Sharon, approximately 50 miles (80 km) west of Albany, the state capital. The city is surrounded by rolling hills and nestled in a winding valley, as well as being near to some of New York State's most popular attractions. Howe Caverns is 15 miles (24 km) to the south, while The Mohawk River and Erie Canal are 10 miles (16 km) to the north. The Adirondack Park is further north, about one hour away, and the Catskill Park is 50 miles (80 km) to the south. Cooperstown, home to the National Baseball Hall of Fame and Museum, The Fenimore Farm & Country Village and the Fenimore Art Museum, are 22 miles (35 km) to the west.

Since the mid- to late-1980s, Sharon Springs has gained increased local attention and prominence in Schoharie County. Entrepreneurs from outside the region started businesses and restored its structures, prompting regional and New York City media to track the progress. It has gained the attention of Korean spa investors, but their plans are currently unrealized. Sharon Springs was recently featured on a cable reality television series, and provided a backdrop for a memoir. The company Sharon Springs, Inc. has begun work on the baths and allowed for people to book stays online at the village's Roseboro Hotel.

== Significance ==
Sharon Springs is recognized by both the National Register of Historic Places as well as New York State's Register of Historic Places as a historic spa village. Many of its historic spa-related structures were added to the National Register of Historic Places in 1994 as the Sharon Springs Historic District. At one time, mineral springs were used for medical treatments and in the summers wealthy families from New York City would travel up to Sharon Springs for the spas. From 1836 to 1860, several large hotels were built in the village, though today they are abandoned. The collection of fully and partially restored 19th-century structures and ruins can be accessed year-round.

The most famous of the springs in the Village is the so-called Gardner Spring, which was owned by the owner of the Pavilion Hotel. As reported in the New York Times on August 30, 1875:

So prodigious is the amount of sulfur-gas in the Gardner Spring that the waters of this creek are rendered as white as milk, and the stones are covered with a thick deposit. All the objects which have been thrown into the stream from above—old shoes, tin pails, and other things of a similar nature—become transmuted by the mineral. Some of them become a snowy white, and others are turned to a deep black. The green weeds that grow upon the sides and bottoms of such creeks are here perfectly white, and at first one can hardly tell their nature, but mistakes them for long films of the sulphur deposit.

Sharon Springs has drawn people to the area because of the Village's four different mineral waters and the water's healing qualities. The village has sulfur, magnesia, chalybeate and 'Blue Stone' springs., During the 19th century, Sharon Springs grew into a bustling spa, and at the peak of its popularity, Sharon Springs hosted 10,000 visitors each summer, including members of the Vanderbilt family and Oscar Wilde, who also gave a lecture at the now-demolished Pavilion Hotel on August 11, 1882. Direct ferry-to-stagecoach lines connected New York City to Sharon Springs, followed by rail lines connecting the Village to New York City, as well as to Boston via Albany.

== History ==
Prior to being settled by Great Britain as part of the country's Province of New York, Sharon Springs was frequented by the indigenous Iroquois population for its healing waters. After Britain's Royal Proclamation of 1763, the Crown formed Tryon County in 1772, which lay at the westernmost reaches of the original Thirteen Colonies. Sharon Springs, then known as the town of New Dorlach, was settled circa 1780. Tryon County stretched from the Adirondack Mountains to the Delaware River and boasted a pre-Revolutionary War farming community of 10,000 people, known as the "Breadbasket of the Colonies".

During the American Revolution, the Town of Sharon participated very little in combat, though it did see some battles. One significant moment was the Battle of Sharon, which was fought on July 10, 1781. Approximately 300 British and Iroquois troops commanded by John Doxtader camped at the Sharon Springs Swamp, near the present-day intersection of Route 20 and County Road 34. The group burned down 12 homes in a small Canajoharie River settlement and claimed victory in the Battle of Currytown on July 9. Colonel Marinus Willett of the American forces headed to their camp with a force of 150 men. Willet attacked the redcoats in the dense swamp, killing 40. Doxtader's men fled and Willett claimed The Battle of Sharon as an American victory.

During and after the Revolution, Sharon Springs was part of the town of Schoharie in Tryon County. In 1784, Tryon County was renamed Montgomery County to honor General Richard Montgomery, an American war hero who gave his life trying to capture the city of Quebec. In 1791, Otsego County was broken off from Montgomery County, and in 1795, Schoharie was formed from adjoining parts of Otsego and Albany counties. The town of Sharon was formed shortly after in 1797. 74 years later, Sharon Springs was set apart from the town of Sharon in 1871, when residents incorporated it as a village.

=== Immigration ===
According to an article published in the New York Times (August 26, 2000), Sharon Springs lost its fashionable Social Register set to the horse-racing attractions of Saratoga Springs. Wealthy Jewish families of German origin, who were unwelcome at Saratoga due to the prevailing social bias of the time, filled the void and "made Sharon Springs a refuge of their own." Eventually, these families moved on to other, more modern resorts, and the Village began to fade economically. Other factors that exacerbated the Village's early 20th century decline were Prohibition (which reduced the need for the local hop harvest) and the opening of the New York State Thruway (which routed traffic away from the area).

Sharon Springs was also associated with several beer barons in the late 19th and early 20th centuries. Most American hops were grown in a belt stretching from Madison to Schoharie Counties in upstate New York. Thus, this area attracted brewers who summered in the area, two of whom, Henry Clausen and Max Shaefer, built homes in the Village. The New York hops trade disappeared after the first world war due to the combined effects of competition from Oregon, a hops blight, and the coming of Prohibition.

From the 1920s to the 1960s, kuchaleyans flourished. These were self-catered boarding houses, and in Yiddish the name means "cook-alones." They were a more affordable alternative to the larger, more expensive hotels and were especially popular during the Depression and, after with poor, post-war refugees from Europe. Though none operated past the 1980s, one of them, "The Brustman House" on Union Street, survives as a retreat for the owners' descendants. This house's story is typical of the kuchaleyans.

As the cited New York Times article went on to explain that after World War II, Sharon Springs got a second wind from the West German government, which "paid medical care reparations to Holocaust survivors, holding that therapeutic spa vacations were a legitimate part of the medical package." In the summer of 1946, one of the busboys at the Spanish Colonial Revival style Adler Hotel was Edward I. Koch, the future mayor of New York City.

The 1970s through the 1990s saw the succession of secular Jewish tourists to Sharon Springs by Hasidim and ultra-Orthodox Jewish visitors, fed in part by a parallel displacement in the nearby Borsht Belt. Their time in Sharon Springs is documented in "The Short Season of Sharon Springs," published by Cornell University Press in 1980. A host of Hasidim-owned and frequented hotels flourished in the Village, bridging the gap between Sharon Springs' shining past as a world-class resort for the rich and famous and its recent renascence as a regional travel and weekend destination.

=== Resurgence ===
In the 1970s, concurrent migration of weekend hunters and union trade workers from the Downstate New York City suburbs began coming to Sharon Springs and Schoharie County. As suburban and urban hunters tracked deer in the area, they also introduced the once-endangered wild turkey to this and other rural areas. Unlike the Hasidim tourists, who have mostly moved on to other destinations and have dwindled in number, the first wave of suburban weekenders added to the community by building their families in the Village and relocating their full-time lives to their former part-time escape.

Sharon Springs, after drifting into a rundown state by the late 1980s, has seen resurgence in the 1990s. Much of it can be attributed to both a stabilization of the remaining historic structures (arson leveled many of the abandoned hotels) and an infusion of ambitious buyers from outside the area looking for an affordable community to start a business or to add rural weekends to their city life. The New York Times cites the revival to the "uninterrupted supply of affluent, educated second-homers from New York City (3.5 hours away) and Columbia County (2 hours away)... and the exponential growth of a new travel phenomenon, heritage tourism: the quest for things historic by well-heeled tourists." Low real estate prices, early renovations, successful start-ups, positive press including back to back 'Escapes' New York Times articles in 2000, and later post-911 flight from New York City all contributed to an influx of entrepreneurs, artisans and artists.

== Places of interest ==
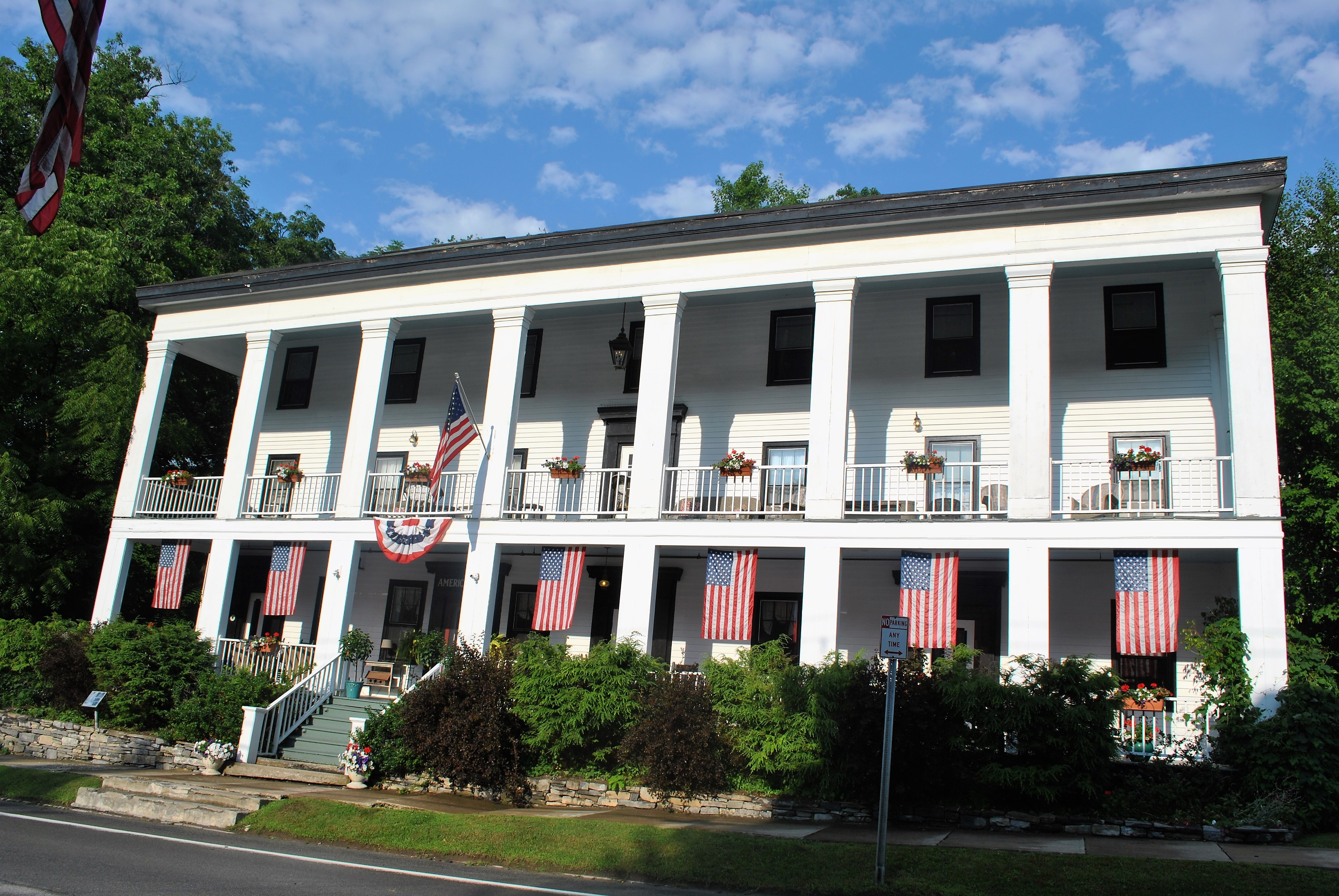
American Hotel

The restoration of The American Hotel on Main Street was among the first completed projects in Sharon Springs' rebirth. The structure was collapsing and abandoned when buyers bought it in 1996. The two buyers refurbished the three-story Greek Revival (c. 1847) into a functioning hotel with a full-service restaurant. The guest houses were renovated in 2005

The Klinkhart Building is also across from the American and formerly housed a 300-seat theatre. There are plans to renovate the building and develop a center for the Arts.

One of the grandest structures during the Village's Spa heyday is The Roseboro. Two local residents prevented the 150-room Roseboro from being demolished and began a massive restoration process. The restoration was never fully completed, but the Roseboro Hotel could now afford to hold shops. Since 2000, the building operates a functioning restaurant, banquet and retail space. It now houses an antique shop and a Victorian tea room.

=== Local successes and Village enterprise ===
Another Village business is Beekman 1802 Mercantile, which was founded in 2008 by Dr. Brent Ridge and author Josh Kilmer-Purcell with the help of soap craftsman Debbie McGillicuddy. The business has been featured in publications and on The Martha Stewart Show. A Planet Green cable network reality television series, The Fabulous Beekman Boys, followed the efforts to build a rural business in 2010 and 2011. The show is notable for its cameo appearances by Martha Stewart, Rosie O'Donnell and other celebrities.

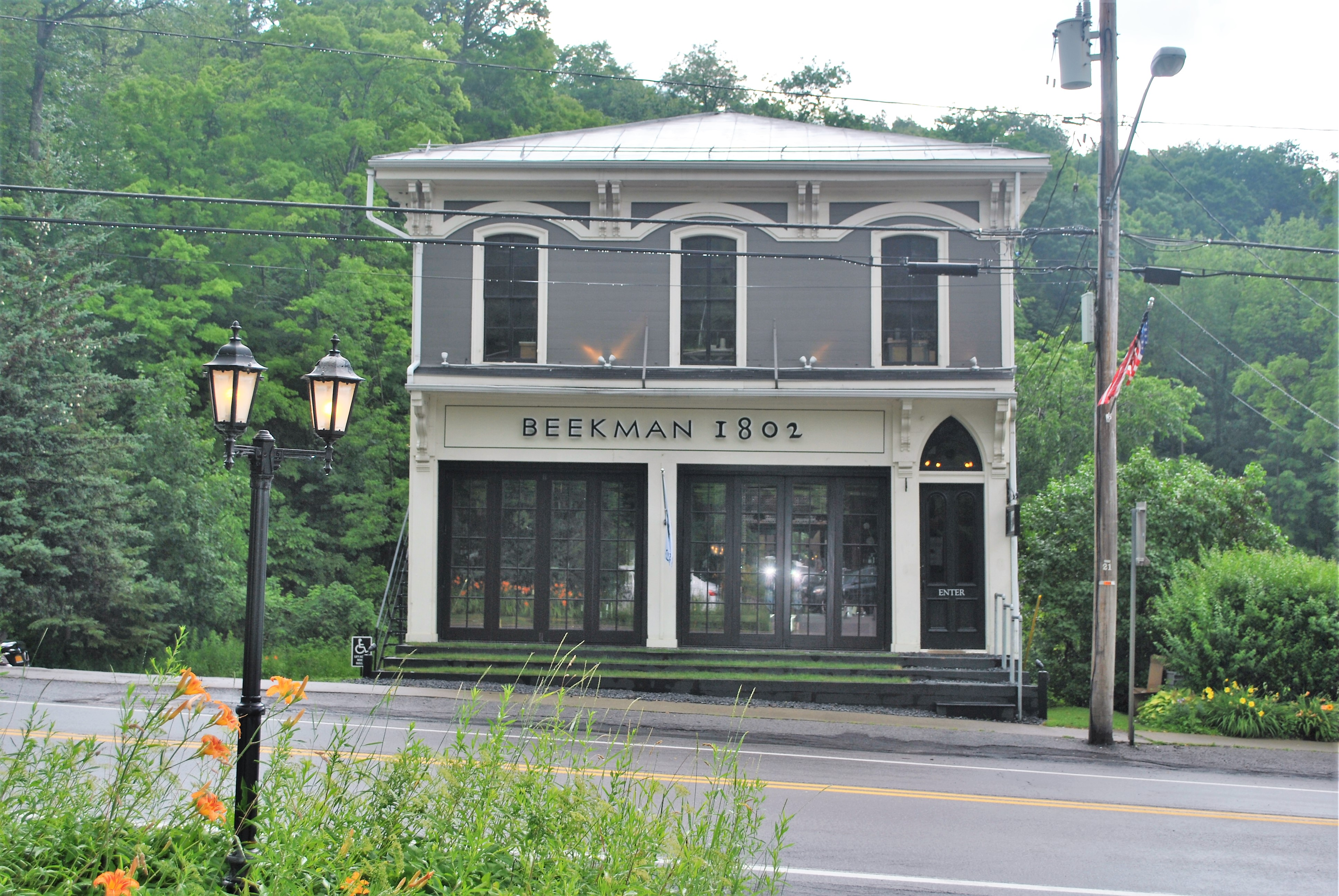
Beekman 1802 Mercantile

The 177 structures in the Village appear on the National Register of Historic Places as a mineral resort. The Village won a grant from the New York State Council for the Humanities to establish a self-guided walking tour through Sharon Springs in 1997. There are plaques that remain to present day in Main Street that allow guests to take the tour. Because many structures no longer stand today, historic photos and informative text on the plaques help visitors to imagine the town's grandeur of a prior time.

The boutique trade in bed and breakfast type inns has allowed the Village to take advantage of the sweeping valley and rolling hill type geography of the community for benefit of the town's economy. Several other inns, beds and breakfast, and houses offering rooms for rent currently operate in and near the Village.

Other entrepreneurs who have moved to the Village continue to contribute to its the city's growth as word of the area's rebirth has spread to neighboring towns, the county, and surrounding regions during the 21st century.

The biggest employer for the Village is a Walmart distribution center; however, there is no actual Walmart in town.

=== Seasonal Events ===
- The Garden Party festival in May
- The Father's Day Tractor & Antique Power Show in June
- Fourth of July parade and celebration
- The summer concert series every Wednesday night in July and August
- The Sharon Springs Annual Antique Fair in August
- The Harvest Festival in September
- The Sharon Springs Poetry Festival in October
- The Victorian Festival in December

== Reality show, cable TV, and movie location ==
In 2009 and 2010, Sharon Springs became the location for the reality television series The Fabulous Beekman Boys on Planet Green television network. During the last 10 years, Sharon Springs has also figured prominently in episodes of The Food Network's $40 A Day and Rachael Ray's Tasty Travels series. Charles Kuralt also filmed a brief segment of his On The Road series here, tracking a rare bluebird only found on the stretch of Route 20 between Albany and the Town of Sharon.

Sharon Springs provided backdrops for two feature films. The first is the 1951 comedy The Model and the Marriage Broker, which features a scene in which Scott, an eligible bachelor, meets up in Sharon Springs with a matchmaker played by Thelma Ritter. The other, more cited movie is 1970's horror cult classic, I Drink Your Blood; almost all of the scenes were filmed on location in the Village.

A postcard of Sharon Springs is featured in the opening intro of the movie National Lampoon's Vacation.

== Potential hotel and resort development ==
In late 2004, an investment group called, Sharon Springs Inc. (SSI) primarily based in New York City purchased the historic Adler, Columbia, and Washington hotels with the goal of turning Sharon Springs back into a resort destination. The Washington, in poor condition at the time, was partially demolished, and the group expressed their intention to demolish the Hotel Columbia as well. In addition, the group purchased the functioning Imperial Baths which were intended to serve as a key draw to their resort plans.

The properties were acquired for a total of $750,000. The Baths operations were closed at the end of the 2005 season marking the first time since the early 19th century that the village did not have a mineral bath tourist trade. The 150-room Adler Hotel on the northern edge of the village was one of the last hotels built prior to the Great Depression, and was recognized for its Spanish style architecture. The five-story hotel opened in 1927 and closed after the 2004 summer season.

In April 2007 the SSI held a press conference and outlined a $12 million plan to restore both the Imperial Baths and the Adler Hotel in an 18-month project that would bring in a projected 700 visitors a day when completed. Harold Shin, project manager for Manhattan-based architectural firm DeArch LLC, described how the Adler would be restored, and how the Imperial Baths would include both traditional baths and modern spa facilities.

The plans have since changed from restoration of the existing historic hotels into a possible "$350 million plan to erect two 11-story hotels — including one with a helipad — a golf course, condominiums and a spa with a bathhouse and a day care center." Demolition and work on the properties was planned to start in 2008 according to the principal partner, Q Sung Cho. The timeline for completion would have been between five and seven years once the project began.

=== Delayed plans ===
As of September 2011, no work has commenced on the project and the purchased historic structures are in deteriorating condition. Buildings such as the Adler and Imperial Baths, which were in use recently before the purchase, may now be in need of immediate and emergency stabilization.

In late June 2013, SSI suggested that plans were back on track although they would require approval from the Sharon Springs council. Per SSI partner AidenHan, their attorney and surveyor Joanne Crum brought details of the long-proposed SSI Imperial Baths project to the Sharon Springs Joint Planning Board on June 26. A formal application for the proposed work, which focused solely on the Baths with no mention of the Adler, was not presented. In the Planning Board meeting, Ms. Crum said, "There are three smaller buildings at the site and the remains of a fourth will be removed, but they will be able to salvage the Imperial Baths and gazebo, both of which will be renovated and restored."

Sharon Springs Inc. received a $5 million loan from Noah Bank in New Jersey in September 2013, along with the utilization of a $1 million Restore NY grant. The money from these sources went directly towards the razing of the Hotel Washington in mid September and were to help fund roof work on the Adler Hotel. By the end of 2013, a decision was to be made about whether to save or raze the Adler Hotel. Additionally, the funds were to go to the restoring of the Imperial Baths structures.

At the close of 2014, the execution of the proposed plans listed above have still not materialized.

== Spa and resort development reboot ==
In May 2015, the often discussed development plans of Sharon Springs Inc., a company owned solely now by Kyu Sung Cho, resurfaced with new renderings and a plan of action. A presentation to the town's Joint Planning Board cited the razing of the collapsed Lower Baths and Laundry and Medical Buildings, which were part of the Imperial Baths complex. Additionally, asbestos under the stucco of the Imperial Baths' façade was to be removed. Long-range plans, dependent on the asbestos removal as well as using NY State Grants, called for demolishing the Columbia Hotel to put a parking lot in its place, and in even longer terms, restoring the Adler Hotel.

The architectural plans for the Imperial Baths called for it to have an Asian theme in the rear but the street side exterior was to closely match the original design. A tour operator hopes to bring visitors from NYC to Sharon Springs as before when the spa was functional.

In November 2024, it was announced that a Japanese hotel management company, Hoshino Resorts, is developing an onsen ryokan (a Japanese style spa and inn) resort in Sharon Springs. The resort is expected to open in 2028.

=== New York State Grants ===
On January 15, 2008, it was announced that under New York State's $100 million Restore NY program, $500,000 was being allocated to Sharon Springs. The grant was intended for the Pavilion Cottages, which are not related to the Adler Hotel/Korean spa projects. The Pavilion Cottages, built in the 1860s, are the last remaining portion of the historic Pavilion Resort. The one remaining structure of Pavilion Cottages was originally accompanied by two other Cottage buildings which offered private suites for families traveling with servants in tow. In 2010, due to missed project deadlines, the matching grant was unfortunately allowed to lapse unused.

On September 2, 2009, Restore New York / Empire State Development's Communities Initiative - Round 3 - announced they were granting $1,000,000 for creation of The Imperial Spa by Sharon Springs Inc. Per the Empire State Development press release: "The rehabilitation will create spa and therapy areas of" 41,200 square feet (3,830 m^{2}) and 6,400 square feet (590 m^{2}) "for outdoor bathing facilities. The total renovated square footage, including amenities such as restaurants and gift shops, will be" 50,000 square feet (4,600 m^{2}). The project funding was anticipated to create 100 new jobs in the community and aimed to rehabilitate the historic Imperial Bathhouse (circa 1927) into a modern luxury spa, as well as re-establish Sharon Springs as a spa destination in New York.

However, the group's standstill on the project leaves the potential restoration of the Imperial Baths uncertain. In the meantime, the historic bathhouses continue to deteriorate.

== Geography ==
Sharon Springs is located at 42°47′41″N 74°36′57″W (42.794783, -74.615946).

According to the United States Census Bureau, the village has a total area of 1.8 square miles (4.7 km^{2}), all land.

Sharon Springs is located on New York State Route 10 (Main Street) immediately north of U.S. Route 20. Bowmaker Pond and Clausen Pond are two small lakes, located south of the village.

== Demographics ==
Historical population
Census	Pop.	Note	%±
1870	520		—
1880	627		20.6%
1890	622		−0.8%
1900	567		−8.8%
1910	459		−19.0%
1920	400		−12.9%
1930	364		−9.0%
1940	433		19.0%
1950	361		−16.6%
1960	351		−2.8%
1970	421		19.9%
1980	514		22.1%
1990	543		5.6%
2000	547		0.7%
2010	558		2.0%
2020	483		−13.4%
U.S. Decennial Census

As of the census of 2000, there were 547 people, 204 households, and 130 families residing in the village. The population density was 299.5 inhabitants per square mile (115.6/km^{2}). There were 270 housing units at an average density of 147.8 per square mile (57.1/km^{2}). The racial makeup of the village was 97.62% White, 0.73% African American, 0.18% Native American, and 1.46% from two or more races. Hispanic or Latino of any race were 1.83% of the population.

There were 204 households, out of which 30.9% had children under the age of 18 living with them, 52.9% were married couples living together, 6.9% had a female householder with no husband present, and 35.8% were non-families. 29.9% of all households were made up of individuals, and 12.7% had someone living alone who was 65 years of age or older. The average household size was 2.42 and the average family size was 3.03.

In the village, the population was spread out, with 23.4% under the age of 18, 5.7% from 18 to 24, 27.1% from 25 to 44, 20.5% from 45 to 64, and 23.4% who were 65 years of age or older. The median age was 40 years. For every 100 females, there were 89.3 males. For every 100 females age 18 and over, there were 83.0 males.

The median income for a household in the village was $37,969, and the median income for a family was $45,000. Males had a median income of $36,563 versus $28,125 for females. The per capita income for the village was $24,664. About 8.5% of families and 12.1% of the population were below the poverty line, including 23.4% of those under age 18 and 4.3% of those age 65 or over.
