= George Lamson =

George Lamson may refer to:

- George Henry Lamson (1852–1882), English doctor and murderer hanged in 1882
- George H. Lamson, football coach for the Connecticut Huskies
