= Burrall =

Burrall is a surname. Notable people with the surname include:

- Fred Burrall (1935–2016), American politician
- William Porter Burrall (1806–1874), American politician and railroad executive
