= Robert Schuyler =

American financier, steamboat operator, and railroad president

1st President of the Illinois Central Railroad
- In office March 19, 1851 – July 3, 1854
- Preceded by: Office created
- Succeeded by: William Porter Burrall

Personal details
- Born: Robert Schuyler; September 16, 1798 Rhinebeck, New York, U.S.
- Died: November 15, 1855 (aged 57) Nice, France
- Resting place: Greenridge Cemetery
- Spouse: Lucinda Wood (m. 1826)
- Relations: See Schuyler family
- Children: 6, including Robert
- Parent(s): Philip Jeremiah Schuyler; Sarah Rutsen
- Education: Harvard College
- Occupation: President of the New York and New Haven Railroad

Robert Schuyler or Robert Livingston Schuyler (September 16, 1798 – November 15, 1855), was an American financier, steamboat operator, and railroad president who acted as the de facto head of the prominent Schuyler family during his adulthood. Schuyler was called "America's first railroad king." He had a role in America's first large-scale stock fraud on the New York and New Haven Railroad. His scandal is among the greatest scandals in Wall Street history alongside the Bernie Madoff scandal and the Richard Whitney scandal.

== Early life ==
Schuyler was born in Rhinebeck, New York, in 1798. He was the youngest of five children born to Philip Jeremiah Schuyler (1768–1835), a U.S. Representative, and Sarah Rutsen (1770–1803), who died when he was young. After his mother's death in 1803, his father remarried to Mary Anna Sawyer (1786–1852), the daughter of Micajah Sawyer, a founding member of American Academy of Arts and Sciences, with whom he had three more children. His siblings from his parents marriage were Philip P. Schuyler, who married Rosanna Livingston; Stephan Van Rensselaer Schuyler, who married Catherine Morris; Catherine Schuyler, who married Samuel Jones; and John Rutsen Schuyler. His half-siblings from his father's second marriage were William Schuyler; Sybil Schuyler; and George Lee Schuyler (1811–1890), who married Eliza Hamilton, daughter of his cousin, James Alexander Hamilton (son of Alexander Hamilton and Eliza Schuyler Hamilton). After her death, he married Eliza's sister, Mary Morris Hamilton.

His paternal grandparents were Philip Schuyler (1733–1804), a Revolutionary War General and U.S. Senator, and Catherine Van Rensselaer (1734–1803), a member of the prominent Van Rensselaer family. His maternal grandfather was John Rutsen (1743–1771), a descendant of Wilhelmus Beekman and inheritor of a large portion of the Beekman Patent, which encompassed much of what is now Dutchess County.

Schuyler graduated with a B.A. degree from Harvard College in 1817, where he was a member of Phi Beta Kappa society, and the Porcellian Club, along with Samuel Atkins Eliot, Wyllys Lyman, Samuel Joseph May, Thomas Russell Sullivan, Charles Henry Warren, and Francis William Winthrop. His mathematical thesis at Harvard was on "fluxional solutions."

== Career ==
Schuyler started his career with steamboats. In 1838, he was president of the New York and Boston Transportation Company, of which William W. Woolsey, Moses B. Ives, and James G. King were among the directors. The company later became known as the New Jersery Steam Navigation and Transportation Company as well as the Transportation Company. He owned steamboats, including one called the Chancellor Livingston in the 1840s, which was his principal business. Around 1846, he became involved with the railroads along with his half-brother, George Lee Schuyler, who formed R. & G. L. Schuyler, a railroad contracting firm. According to William B. Astor, Schuyler was spoken of as a skillful engineer and a man of good business capacity.

=== Railroad career ===
At one time, Schuyler was president of five railroads, including the New York & New Haven Railroad, the Harlem, the Illinois Central, the Rensselaer & Saratoga, and the Sangamon & Morgan Railroads. In addition to helping develop several others, including the Vermont Valley Railroad, thereby earning the title of "America’s first railroad king." He was also secretary of the Brooklyn and Jamaica Railroad, treasurer of the Housatonic Railroad Company, and vice-president of the New Jersey Railroad and Transportation Company.

During his career, Schuyler was considered a master negotiator and when he was president of the Harlem Railroad, he arranged a running agreement with Edwin D. Morgan, then the president of the Hudson River Railroad, and later a U.S. Senator and Governor of New York. He was involved with many of the leading bankers, financiers, and investors of the day, including Gouverneur Morris, Elihu Townsend. Schuyler was also a founding member of the Union Club, the city's oldest social club.

From March 19, 1851, to July 3, 1854, Schuyler served as the first president of Illinois Central Railroad, following his company's initial purchase of a finished portion of the railway from Jacksonville to Meredosia in the 1840s. The Railroad was the recipient of the first federal land grant. Upon his resignation following the 1854 scandal, he was succeeded by the vice-president of the Railroad, William Porter Burrall.

=== 1854 fraud ===
Schuyler served as president of the New York and New Haven Railroad, which began service on Christmas Day, 1848. In addition to his role as president, he was also the company's sole transfer agent, which meant that every sale of the company stock went through him alone. Following the Norwalk disaster in 1853, and after the railroad's stock price dropped in the summer of 1854, he wrote to the board of directors resigning and stating "Your attention to the stock ledgers of your Company is essential, as you will find there is much that is wrong." The discovery of his fraud in 1854 has been referred to as "America’s first large-scale stock fraud." It was eventually discovered that Schuyler issued 19,540 shares in unauthorized stock certificates (worth approximately $2 million US$2,000,000 (equivalent to about $71,666,700 in 2025)) for the railroad. To compound matters, Schuyler had used the fraudulent stock as collateral against loans taken out by several people, including one from Cornelius Vanderbilt for US$600,000 (equivalent to about $21,500,000 in 2025).

Due to Schuyler's vast business interest and prominence at the highest levels of New York society, the discovery caused a shock and sensation throughout the northeast. The fraud caused the railroad to endure years of legal battles as well as a loss of $1.8 million US$1,800,000 (equivalent to about $64,500,000 in 2025). Indirectly, the fraud caused Wall Street to enact legal and procedural changes to avoid similar types of fraud. While the Justice Daniel P. Ingraham of the New York State Supreme Court initially found that the stock issued by Schuyler was void, the appeal eventually made it the U.S. Supreme Court, where the fraudulently issued stocks were upheld. The newspapers of the day covered the fraud and its effects for several years.

Schuyler wrote to The New York Times in July 1855, attempting to explain away the scandal as a misunderstanding stating "I hope you will publish this statement, which I have prepared under great difficulty--without documents, and upon your report alone--in the greatest debility of body, and in broken spirit, but with clear recollection."

Following the scandal, Schuyler fled to Canada through Quebec. He then went on to Geneva and Nice, France, where he died in November 1855, apparently caused by "grief and mortification."

== Personal life ==
Schuyler maintained a residence at 149 Mercer Street during his time in New York City. Schuyler, who was known to society as a bachelor, had a long-term relationship with Lucinda Waldron "Lucy" Wood (1807–1882). Together, they were the parents of six children. Reportedly, even though he was the father of her children, they didn't marry because she was from a less well-known and respectable family than his. However, when his eldest daughters wanted to marry, her fiancé discovered that her father was the famous Robert Schuyler and that she was, in fact, an illegitimate child. The fiancé, a Reverend, insisted that in order for them to marry, her parents must marry. Therefore, Schuyler agreed to marry Lucinda and installed her and the family in a fashionable home in Manhattan on 22nd Street. Other reports indicated that he actually married Wood in 1826, but didn't socially acknowledge the marriage until the 1850s. Their children included:

- Julia Wood Schuyler, who married Rev. William Orne Lamson (1824–1909) in 1850.
- Robert Sands Schuyler (1830–1895), who married Caroline E. Acker (1840–1905) in 1864.
- Catherine Schuyler
- Louisa Schuyler
- George Schuyler
- William Sawyer Schuyler (1840–1864), who married Florence Miriam Barbour (1840–1895), daughter of Oliver Lorenzo Barbour and niece of Chancellor Reuben H. Walworth, in 1859. William, a Captain with the 155th Regiment and aide-de-camp, died from wounds sustained in the Battle of Cold Harbor during the American Civil War.

Schuyler died in Nice, France, on November 15, 1855. His coffin was sent back to New York and he was buried at Greenridge Cemetery in Saratoga Springs, New York. Even after his death, the newspapers reported seeing him abroad.

Following his death, his New York City home and its contents were auctioned off and reportedly became a brothel run by "Mrs. Van Ness." After his death, his widow moved back to the United States and retired to a cabin on Saratoga Lake.

=== Descendants ===
Through his daughter Julia, he was the grandfather of Major Robert Schuyler Lamson (1855–1876), who died at 21 years of age at Darfour in Upper Egypt from malarious fever while serving in the Egyptian Army as a mercenary, and George Henry Lamson (1852–1882), a doctor in Paris who developed a morphine addiction, which was said to have caused him to murder his wife's brother. He was found guilty of murder and hanged in 1882 at Wandsworth Gaol in London.

Through his youngest son William, he was the grandfather of Philip William Schuyler (b. 1861), who married Amanda Mason Erwen, daughter of Robert Moody Erwen and Agnes (née Gominger) Erwen, in 1886.
