= George Henry Lamson =

American physician and murderer

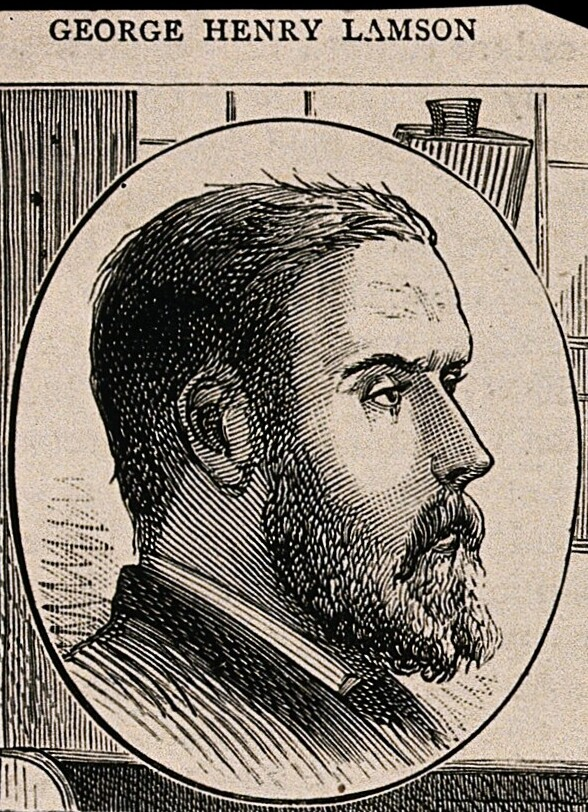
- Born: 8 September 1852; United States
- Died: 28 April 1882 (aged 29); Wandsworth Prison, London, England
- Relatives: Robert Schuyler (grandfather)
- Awards: Legion of Honour
- Status: Executed by hanging
- Conviction: Murder
- Penalty: Death

George Henry Lamson (8 September 1852 – 28 April 1882) was an American medical doctor and murderer.

== Early life ==
Lamson was born on 8 September 1852. He was the son of Julia Wood Schuyler and William Orne Lamson, who married in 1850.

His maternal grandfather was Robert Schuyler, himself the son of U.S. representative Philip Jeremiah Schuyler, the brother of Elizabeth Schuyler Hamilton and brother-in-law of Alexander Hamilton. His uncle was Robert Sands Schuyler, a prominent New York architect. In 1881, his father was minister of the American community's church in Florence.

Allegedly, a schoolteacher of Lamson's claimed that "the name George Henry Lamson would live long in the name of man." As a boy, Lamson was known to possess a "flair for friendship" and a "genius for languages," fluent in both French and German.

== Career ==
Lamson fought during the Franco-Prussian War with the French Ambulance Corps during the 1871 siege of Paris, receiving a Legion of Honour for his work.

In his early career he had been a volunteer surgeon in Romania and Serbia, and decorated for his work. He returned to England, married (in 1878) and set up in medical practice in fashionable Bournemouth. Living beyond his means, and with his medical practice faring poorly, the morphine addiction he had acquired during his overseas service came to dominate his life and his financial situation grew desperate, with creditors pressing for payment of bills, cheques bouncing and his bank refusing further credit.

=== Murder ===
Lamson's wife (née John) was one of five orphaned siblings who were wards in Chancery, and joint inheritors of a family trust fund. One of her brothers, Herbert John, died suddenly in 1879, leaving Mrs Lamson, her married sister Mrs Chapman (living in Shanklin) and her surviving brother, the youngest sibling, Percy Malcolm John. Eighteen-year-old Percy, a hemiplegic, was boarding at Blenheim House School in Wimbledon, where he received a visit on 3 December 1881 from Lamson (allegedly before making a trip to Florence to visit his father, although in reality, Lamson was staying in London, desperately trying to raise credit, pawn possessions or borrow funds). At tea with Percy and the headmaster Mr Bedbrook, Lamson brought a rich Dundee cake, already cut into portions, which the three shared, and also gave Percy a capsule, which he persuaded the lad to swallow, from a batch that were later tested and found to contain the poison aconitine, as recorded in the case history at Old Bailey Online.

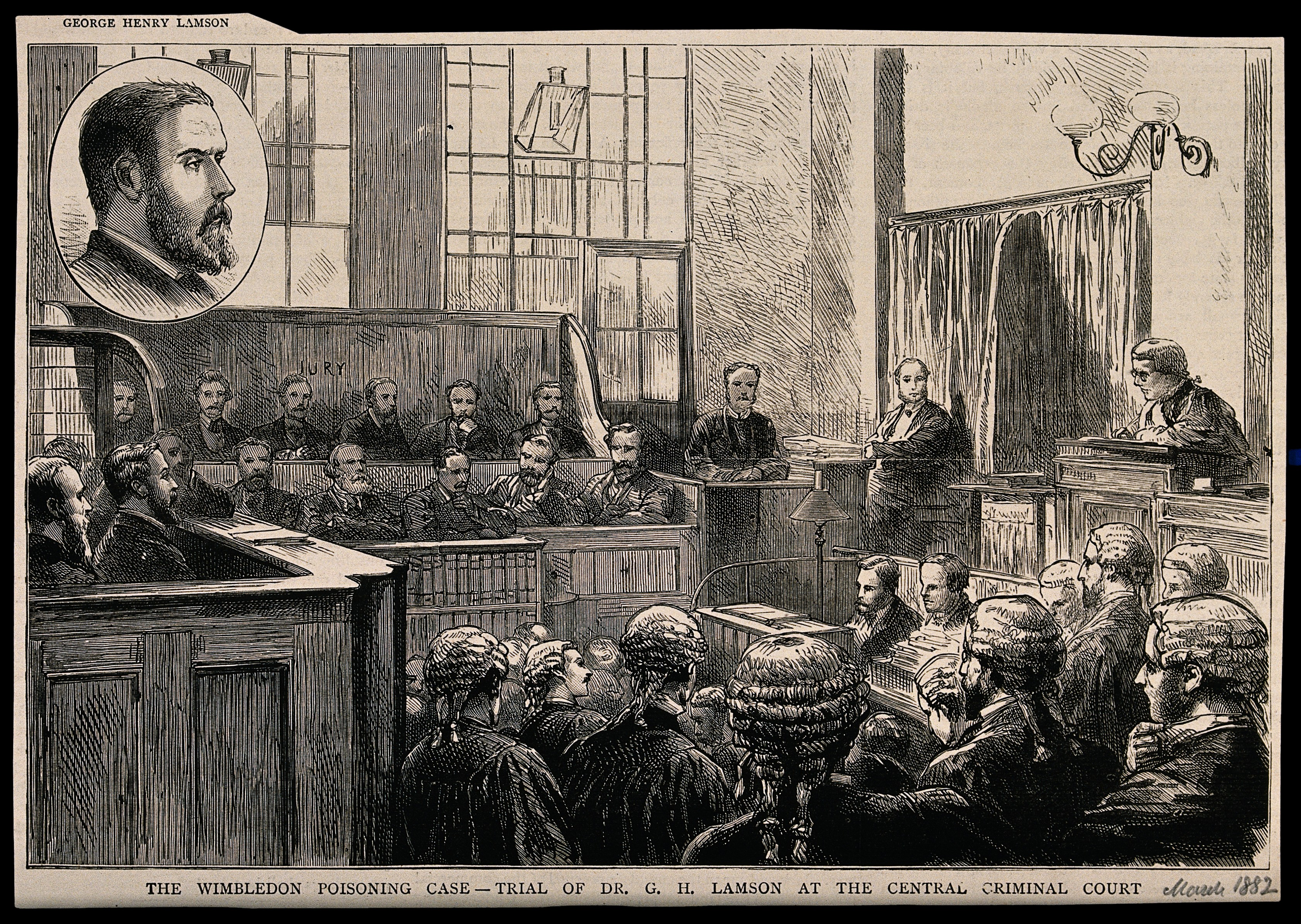
Scenes from the trial, wood engraving.

Lamson was tried at the Old Bailey in March 1882 before Mr Justice Hawkins and a jury; Montagu Williams acted for his defence: he was found guilty of murdering Percy in order to secure his share of the family trust fund, some £3,000 which Percy would have inherited on coming of age. He had poisoned his victim with aconitine in the cake, a substance which Lamson had learned about from Professor Robert Christison at Edinburgh University. Christison had taught that aconitine was undetectable, but forensic science had improved since Lamson's student days and the poison was easily identified, as well as Lamson's purchase of it from a London pharmacist.

Lamson's execution was delayed when U.S. President Chester Alan Arthur wrote to the Home Office, requesting time for Lamson's well-connected family and friends in the United States to send proof of insanity in the doctor's family and in his own life. The evidence was received but failed to secure a reprieve.

Lamson was hanged by William Marwood at Wandsworth Prison on 28 April 1882, having admitted his morphine addiction and effectively his guilt of murdering Percy John.

== See also ==
- Murder of Lakhvinder Cheema
