= Tabby House (Fernandina Beach, Florida) =

Historic house in Florida, United States

- U.S. National Register of Historic Places
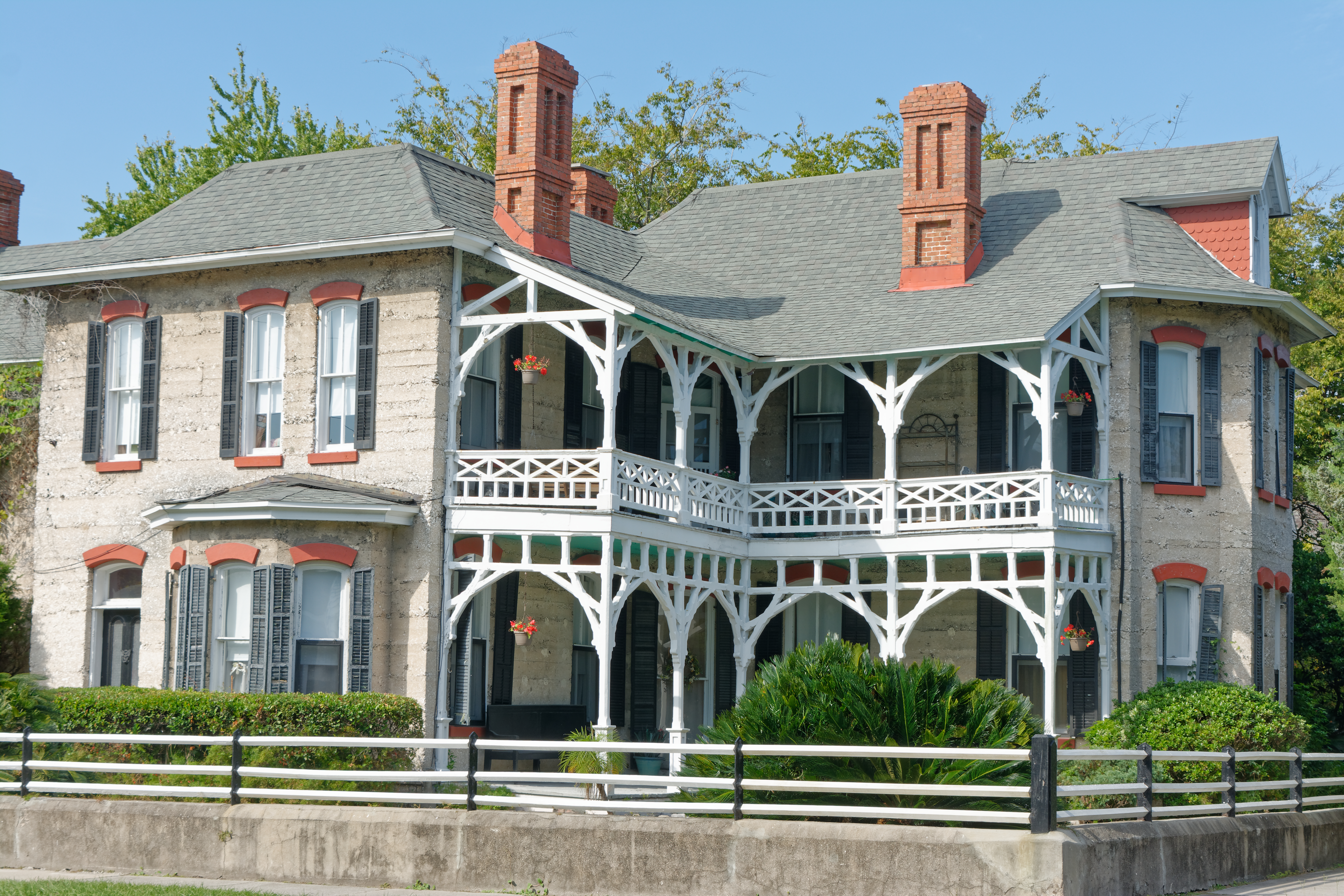

- Location within Florida Location within the United States
- Location: Fernandina Beach, Florida
- Coordinates: 30.66980°N 81.46000°W
- Architect: R. S. Schuyler
- Architectural style: Late Victorian
- NRHP reference No.: 73000594
- Added to NRHP: June 4, 1973

The Tabby House is a historic site in Fernandina Beach, Florida. It is located at 27 South 7th Street. On June 4, 1973, it was added to the U.S. National Register of Historic Places. R. S. Schuyler, credited as the architect, is also listed as the architect of the nearby Fairbanks House, also built in 1885.

Built in 1885 according to the Florida Department of State's Division of Historical Resources, the house is "...2 and a half stories, 2-story veranda with carved posts and brackets..." and is built from bricks made of concrete and local shells. Although lovingly referred to as "The Tabby House" by its owners and local residents, the building materials are not, strictly speaking, tabby, which is a mixture of lime, sand, water, and crushed oyster shells. This house is listed on the US National Historic Register and is a beautiful example of Victorian architecture.

== Gallery ==
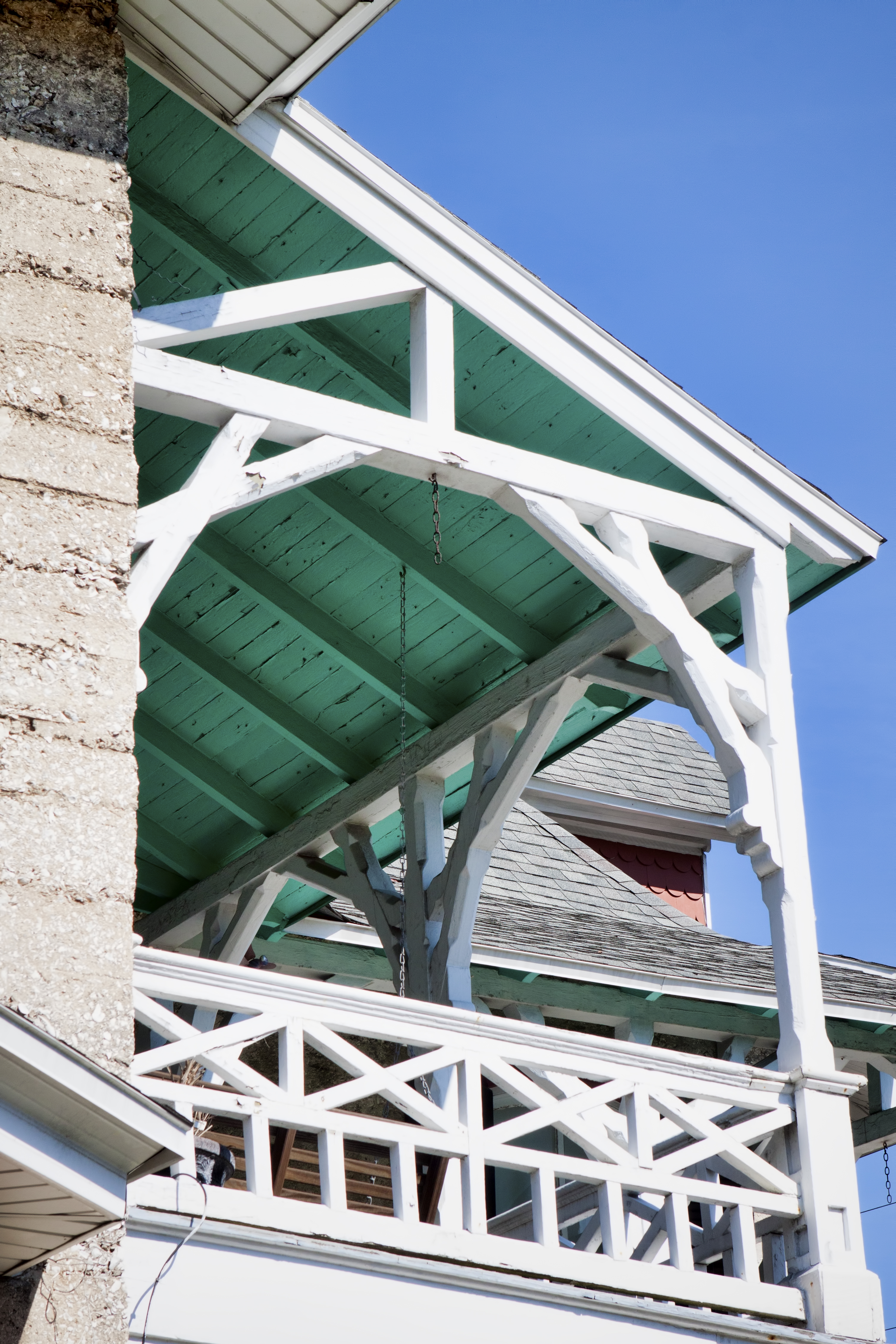

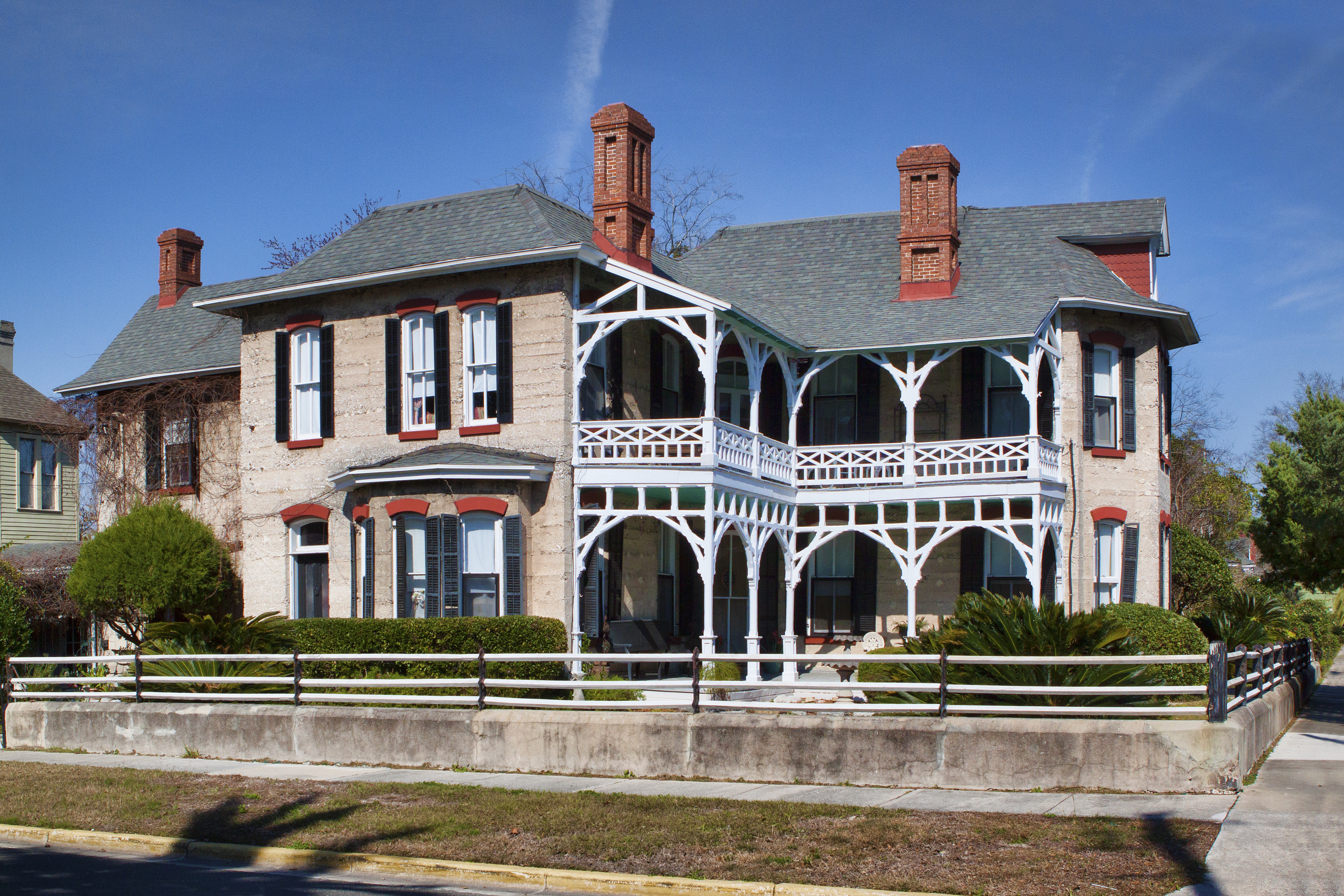

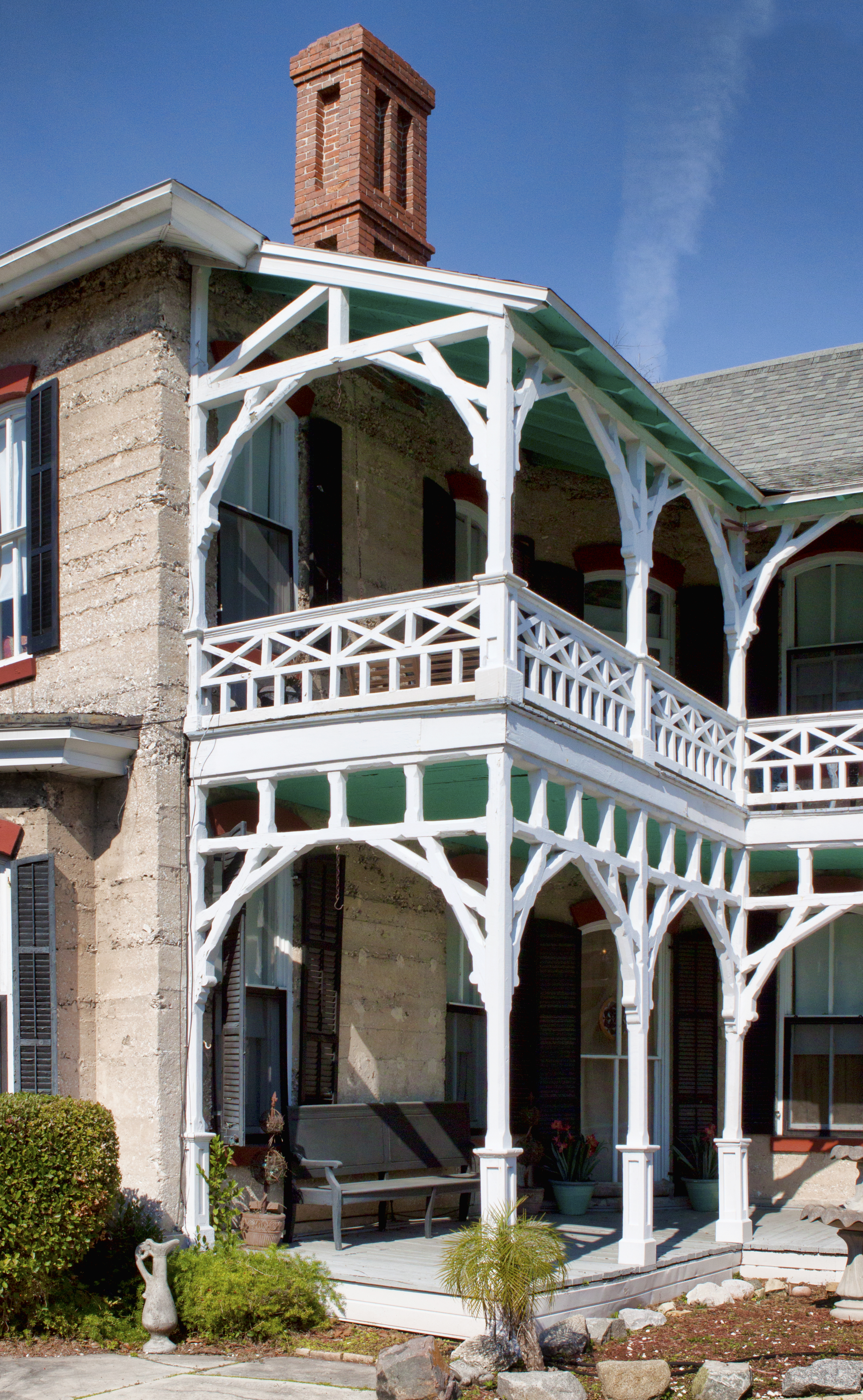

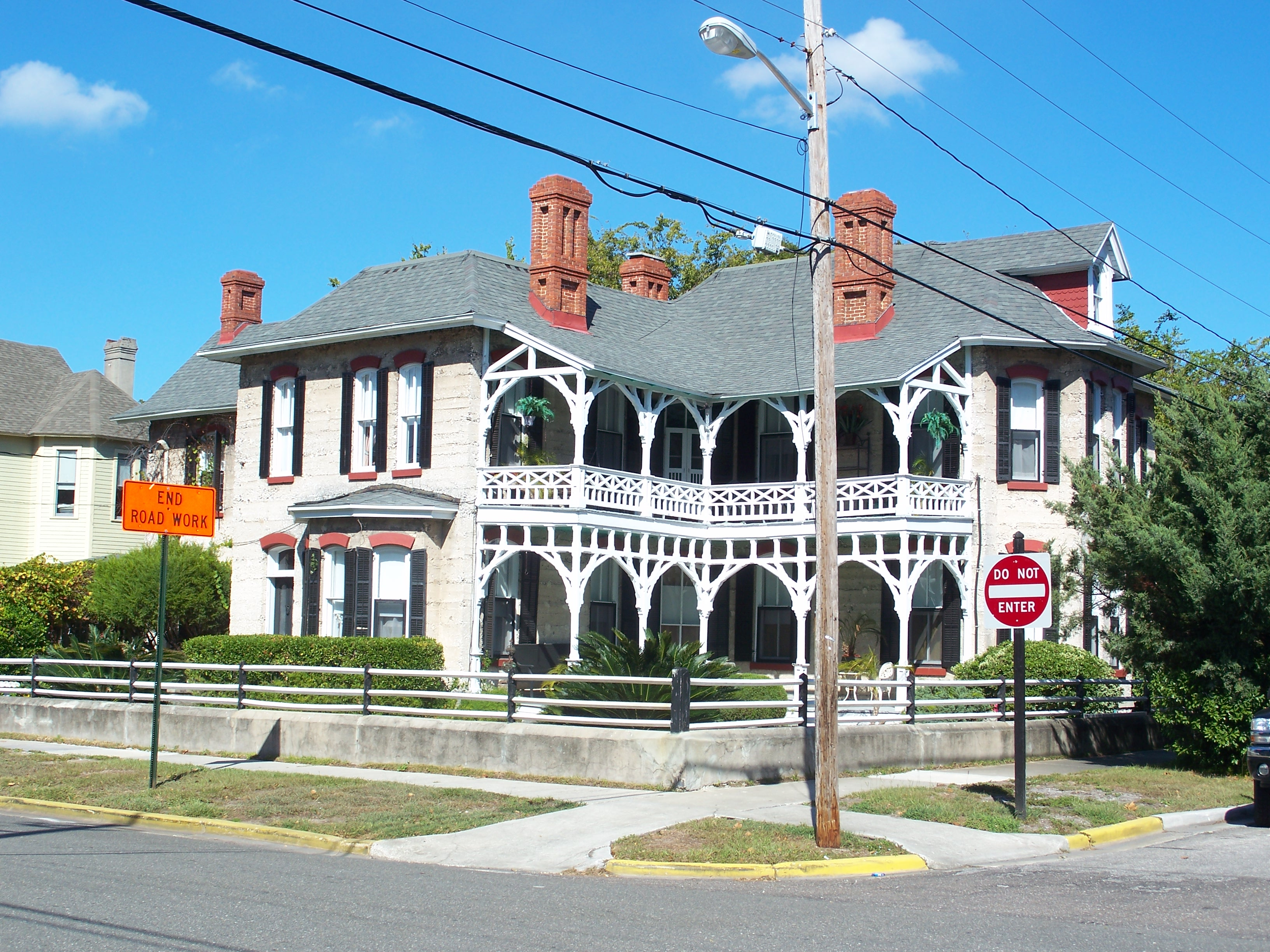
