= Robert Sands Schuyler =

American architect (1830–1895)

- Born: March 6, 1830; New York City, U.S.
- Died: July 24, 1895 (aged 65); Fernandina, Florida, U.S.
- Occupation: Architect
- Spouse: Caroline E. Acker (m. 1864)
- Children: See Schuyler family
- Buildings: St. Andrew's Episcopal Church; St. George Episcopal Church; Tabby House; Fairbanks House

Robert Sands Schuyler (March 6, 1830 – July 24, 1895), often written as R. S. Schuyler and occasionally as R. V. Schuyler (perhaps from a bad NRHP transcription), was a New York architect, designer, and religious leader who moved to Florida and joined political, religious, and civil organizations on Amelia Island. He served as Clerk of the City of Fernandina, chaired the Fernandina Library Association when it was established in 1891, and was a lay reader at the Santa Fe Lake, Florida, Episcopal congregation.

== Early life ==
Schuyler was born in New York City on March 6, 1830. He was educated and married in Troy, New York He was the son of Robert Schuyler (1798–1855) and Lucinda Wood Schuyler.

His paternal grandparents were Philip Jeremiah Schuyler (1768–1835), a U.S. Representative, and Sarah Rutsen. His grandfather was the son of Philip Schuyler, a Revolutionary War General and U.S. Senator, and Catherine Van Rensselaer, a member of the prominent Van Rensselaer family.

== Career ==
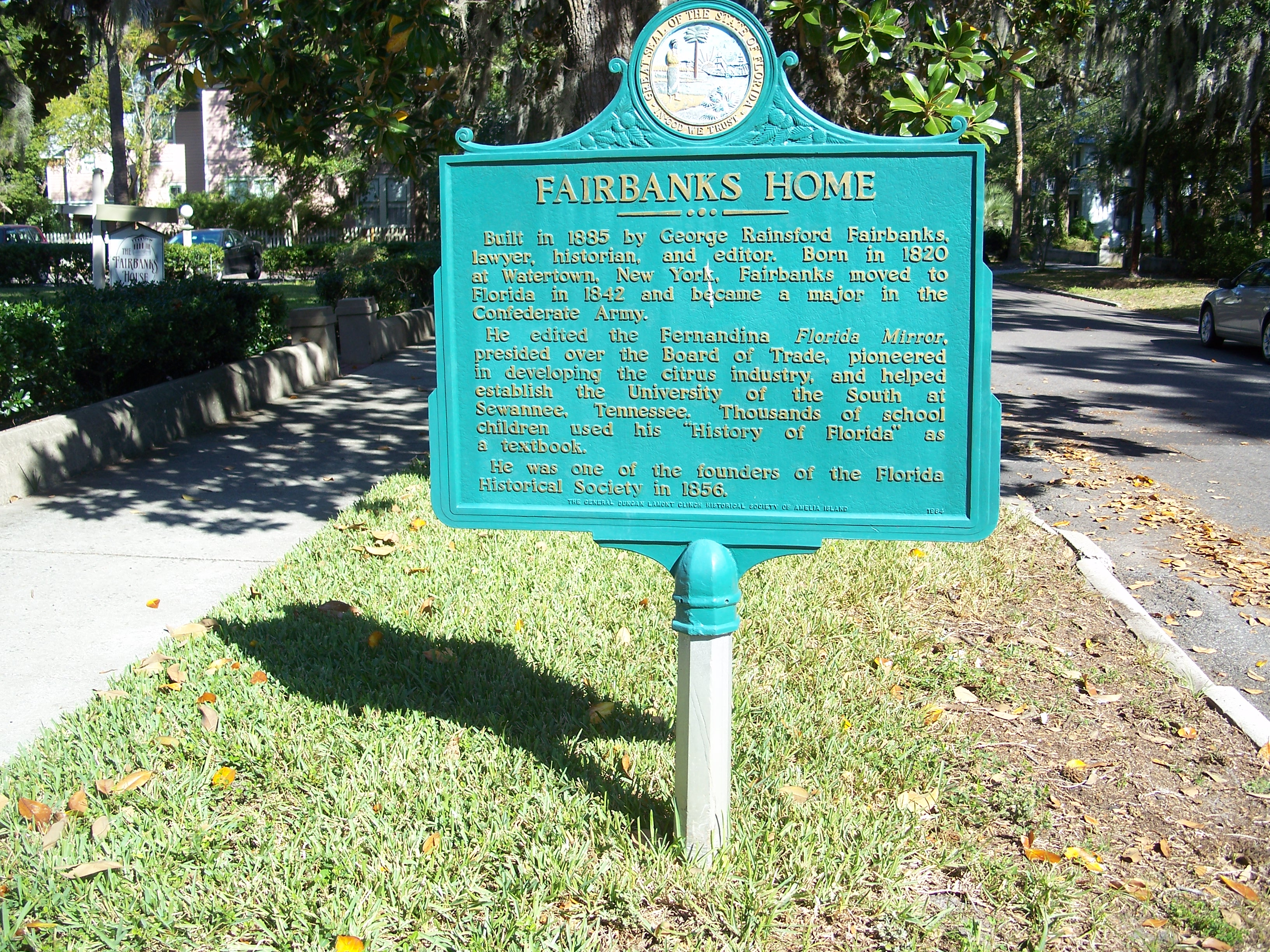
Historical marker at the Fairbanks House

During the U.S. Civil War, he served in the Union cavalry.

In 1881, Schuyler and his wife moved to Florida, joining prominent political, religious, and civil organizations on Amelia Island. He served as Clerk of the City of Fernandina, was Chair of the Fernandina Library Association when it was established in 1891, and was a lay reader at the Santa Fe, Florida, Episcopal congregation.

=== Carpenter Gothic churches ===
He designed churches in Santa Fe, Fairbanks, and Waldo, many in the Carpenter Gothic style. Carpenter Gothic architecture was developed by Richard Upjohn, whom Episcopal Bishop John Freeman Young of Florida had known while he was an assistant rector of Trinity Church in New York City. St. John's served as a model for various churches in Waldo, Fairbanks, as well as the St. Paul's By-The-Sea Episcopal Church in Pablo Beach which Schuyler designed in 1887. In Santa Fe, Schuyler designed St. John's Chapel on land donated by E. B. Ewing.

=== Buildings in Fernandina Beach ===
He is credited with the Fairbanks House (Fernandina Beach, Florida), the Tabby House (Fernandina Beach, Florida) , and the Marcellus Williams Marcellus Williams House Williams House (Fernandina Beach, Florida), all on Amelia Island's Fernandina Beach in Nassau County, Florida. The Fairbanks House belonged to George Rainsford Fairbanks and is listed on the National Register of Historic Places.

== Works ==
- George Fairbanks House
- Tabby House 7th and Ash Streets
- 1886 School House
- Hirth House
- St. Andrew's Episcopal Church 317 Florida Avenue, Jacksonville Gothic Revival 1887. Only remaining church from before the 1901 fire.
- St. Peters Church, Fernandina (1884)

=== Gallery ===
St. Andrew's Episcopal Church in Jacksonville

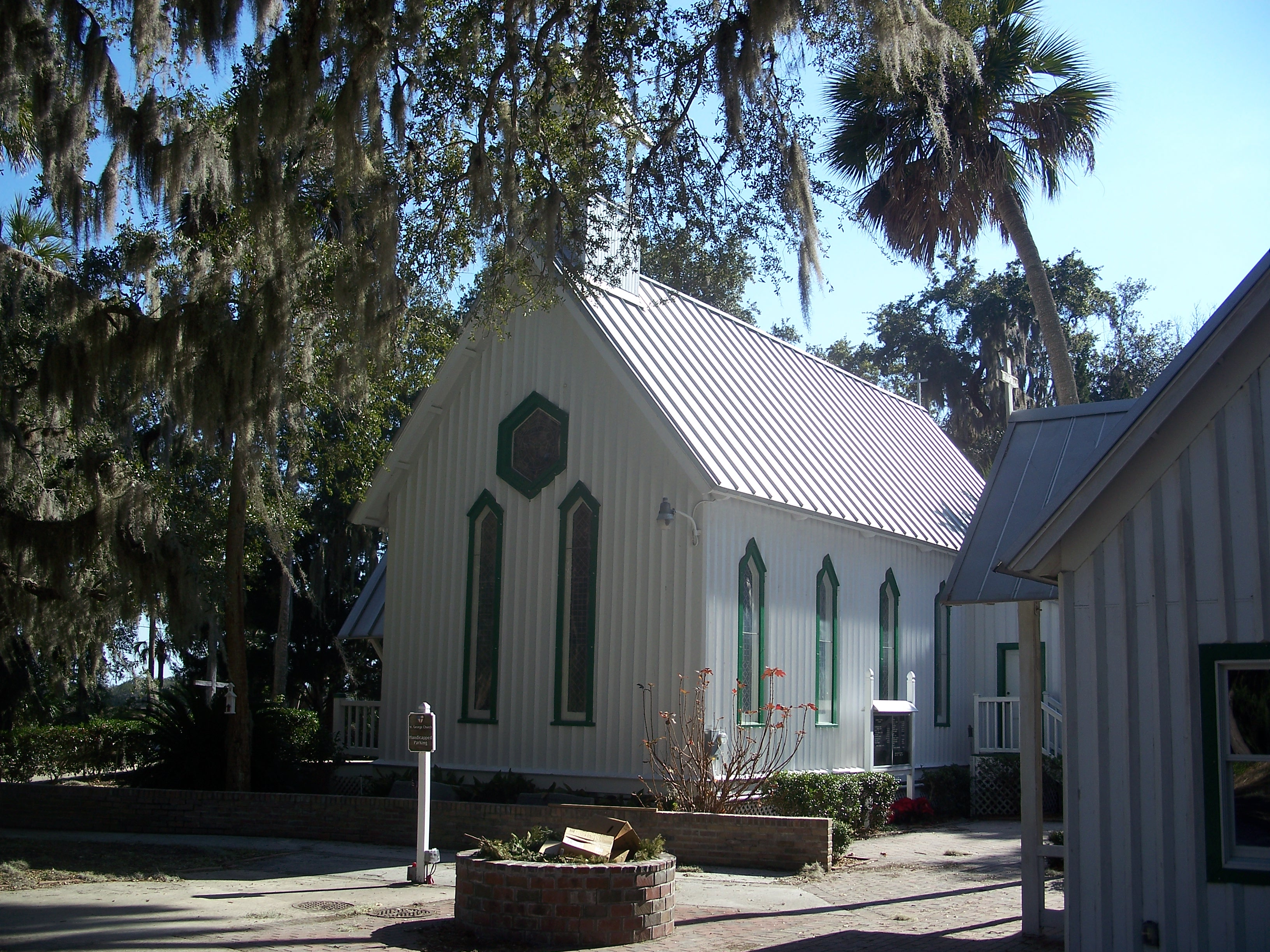
St. George Episcopal Church in Jacksonville

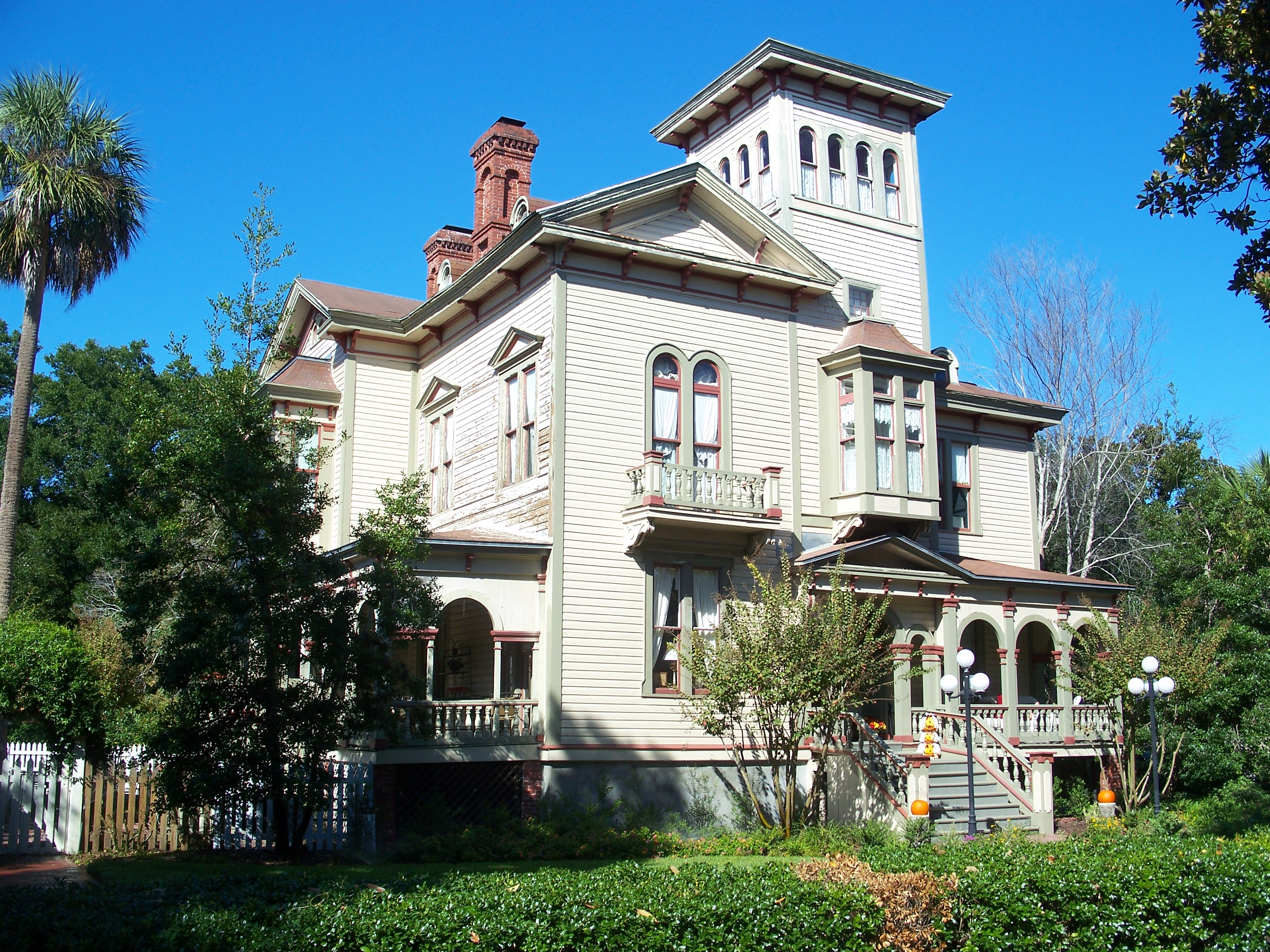
Fairbanks House on Fernandina Beach, Amelia Island

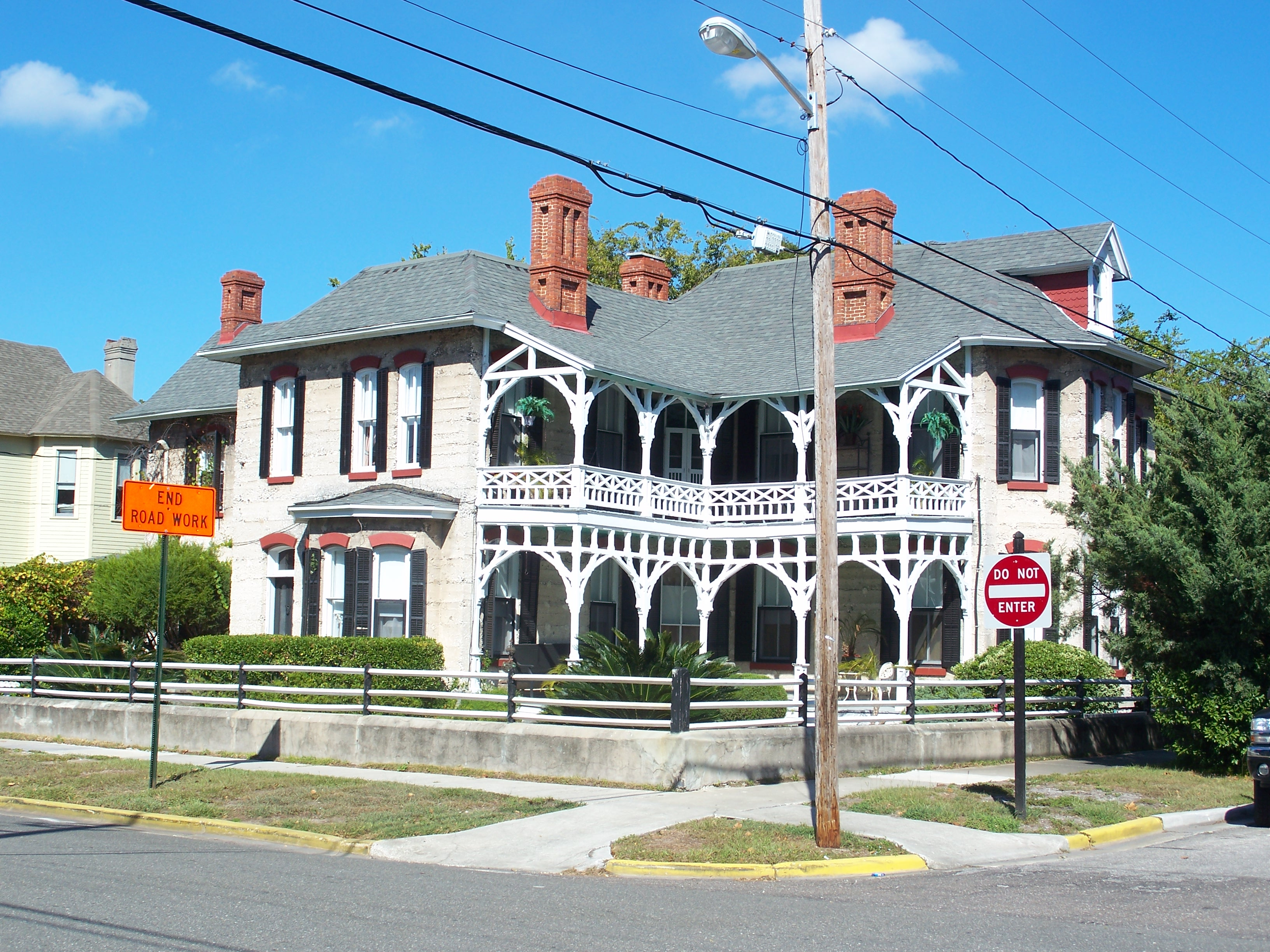
Tabby House

== Personal life ==
In 1864, Schuyler was married to Caroline E. Acker.

Schuyler died in Fernandina, Florida, on July 24, 1895.
