= Jacksonville Historical Society =

Non-profit organization in Florida, US

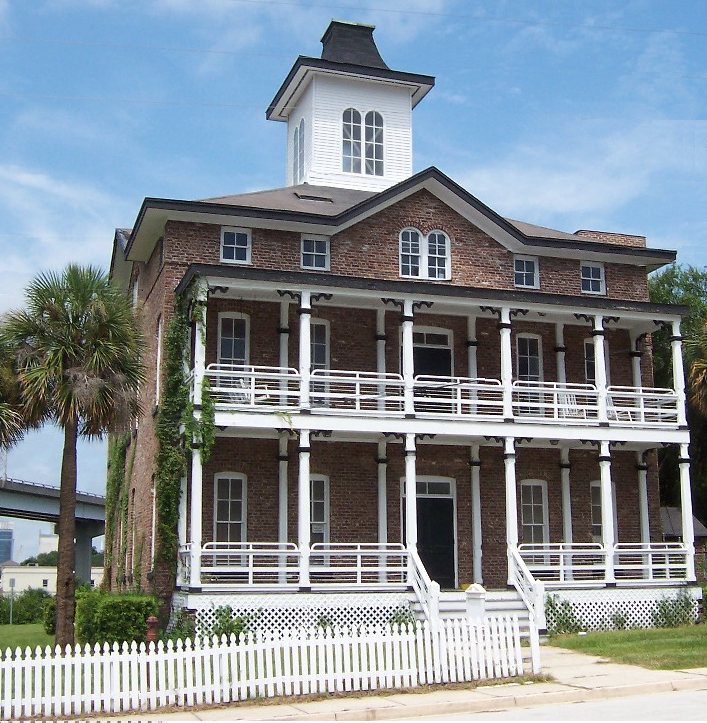
- Formation: 1929
- Type: private
- Legal status: Nonprofit
- Headquarters: Jacksonville, Florida, U.S.
- Location: 314 Palmetto St., Jacksonville, FL 32202
- Region served: Duval County, Florida
- Executive Director: Alan J. Bliss, Ph.D.
- Main organ: Board of Directors
- Website: jaxhistory.org

Jacksonville Historical Society (JHS) is a 501(c)(3) non-profit organization in Jacksonville, Florida, begun by 231 charter members on May 3, 1929, at the Carling Hotel.

== History ==
Henry Holland Buckman was its first president, and its first activity was to assemble a collection of historical memorabilia, including newspapers, photographs, documents, books and correspondence covering the first one hundred years of Jacksonville. The archive is housed at Jacksonville University, but the society is in discussions with the city to transfer the collection to the new Jacksonville Main Library, where it would complement the library's Florida collection.

For its first six decades, the group was content to build an archive, publish booklets, provide research assistance and discuss the history of the first coast. There was nothing permanent—no building and the work was done by volunteers. This changed in 1988 after Sarah Van Cleve was elected president. The JHS became active in the community: the group secured office space, hired an executive director and began to raise funds for projects. It began publishing an extensive newsletter for members and expanded the board of directors to involve more people in the organization. The society began to identify endangered buildings that were being razed without consideration to historical significance.

Old St. Andrews Church, Jacksonville Historical Society

== Old St. Andrews ==
St. Andrew's Episcopal Church was constructed in 1887 and was the only major church to survive Jacksonville's Great Fire of 1901. Residents in the area around the church left for the suburbs in the 1950s, and a new church was built in Arlington. It was named St. Andrews and was given the furnishings and memorials of the old St. Andrews, which was deconsecrated, closed and boarded up for decades. When Jacksonville was awarded an NFL franchise in 1993, the city purchased much of the land surrounding the Gator Bowl Stadium for use in the new Jacksonville Municipal Stadium, including the old church. The city gave the building to JHS on the condition that it be restored, but according to the JHS website, many people thought that the condition of the structure was beyond repair. The society began a campaign to raise one million dollars, which was successful, thanks to a $242,000 preservation grant from the state of Florida in 1996, and a challenge grant from the Weaver Foundation. Restoration began in 1996 and was completed on April 18, 1998, with the structure becoming the new home of the Jacksonville Historical Society. Although the JHS is no longer based in the church, it is still used as a popular venue for weddings, meetings, and other events.

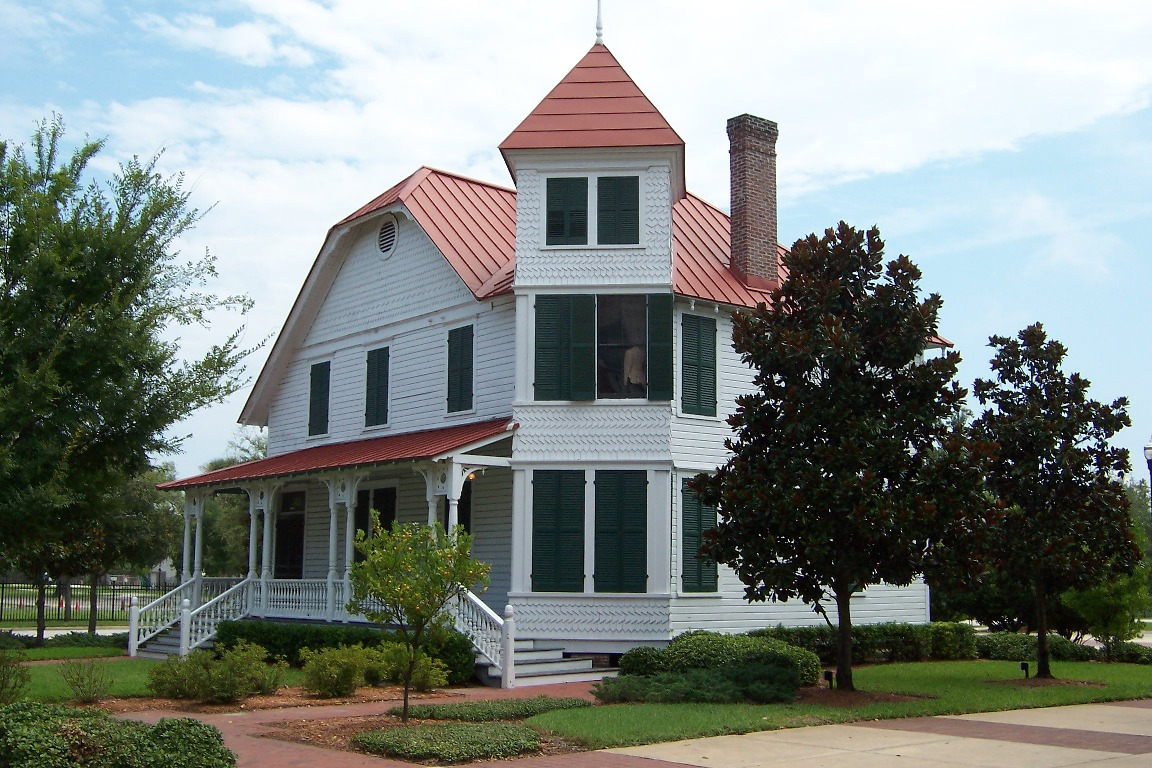
Old Merrill House, Jacksonville Historical Society

== Merrill House ==
Less than a year later, the society began its second restoration project – the relocation and renovation of the historic James E. Merrill House, built in 1879. The Queen Anne style building was scheduled for demolition in 1999, but the city moved it from Lafayette Street to A. Philip Randolph Boulevard and renovation work began. Funding for the project was secured from private donors in addition to city and state preservation grants. The 2002 plans for the Baseball Grounds of Jacksonville placed the structure in left field, so it was moved again, this time next door to the Old St. Andrews Church. The work was completed in late 2005. The Victorian era house is intended to be a museum dedicated to shipbuilding on the St. Johns River.

== Old St. Luke's ==
On August 10, 2009, the JHS announced the pending purchase of the Old St. Luke's Hospital and its conversion into a research and exhibition center. Old St. Luke's Hospital was successfully purchased by the Jacksonville Historical Society in 2012. It is currently the location of the Jacksonville Historical Society's archives, library, and administrative offices.

== Florida Casket Company ==
The Jacksonville Historical Society has owned the Florida Casket Company (also called the Casket Factory), constructed circa 1920, since 2012. In 2019, the Jacksonville Historical Society began a campaign to renovate the building so it could be used for more than storage. The Jacksonville Historical Society plans to use the space for a local music history museum, archival processing and storage, and as a venue.

== See also ==
- List of historical societies in Florida
