= Boca Raton Historical Society and Museum =

Coordinates: 26°21′04″N 80°05′12″W

Boca Raton Historical Society & Museum
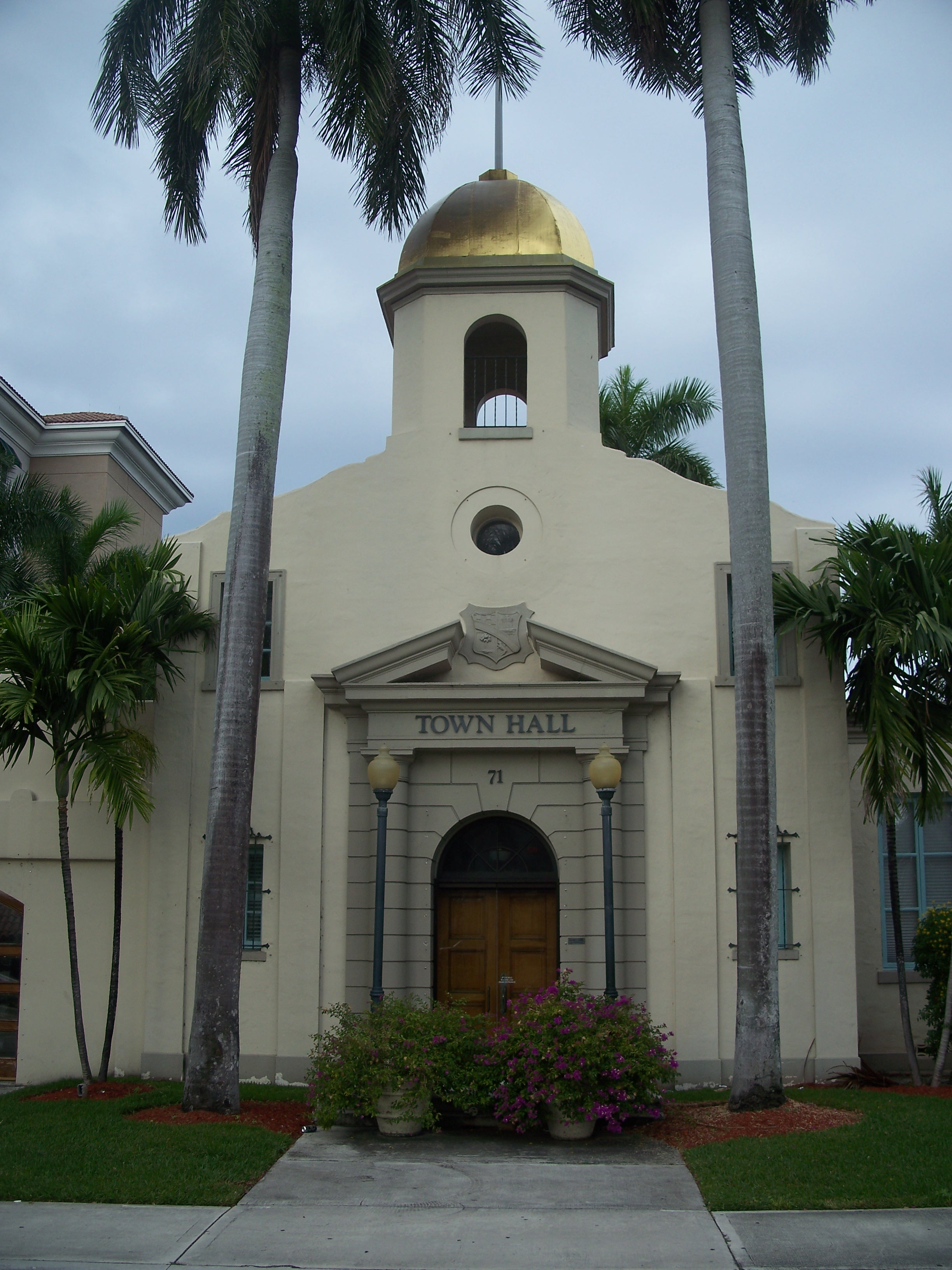
- Boca Raton Historical Museum located in Old Town Hall
- Abbreviation: BRHS&M
- Formation: 1972
- Type: Historical Society
- Headquarters: Boca Raton Old City Hall
- Location: Boca Raton, Florida, United States
- President: Hank Jawhari
- Website: www.bocahistory.org

The Boca Raton Historical Society & Museum (also known as BRHS&M) is a non-profit organization and public museum that specializes in the history and artifacts of Boca Raton, Florida, United States, for educational and advocacy purposes. The society is known for their goal of historic designation and restoring historical structures important to the history of Boca Raton. The society offers exhibits, lectures, lessons, history tours, and educational programs to achieve their goal. Many interactive educational programs and services are provided to schools to help children learn about Florida's history. Additionally, the community provides a library of collected and preserved artifacts, photographs, newspapers, diaries, reference books, and research papers documented for educational and research purposes. The historical society has been a contributor of researching the history of Florida and Boca Raton as an extension. The society offers scholars, educators, university graduates and interns access to their research collection and publications, such as the Spanish Papers. The Boca Raton Historical Museum is publicly open from Monday through Friday from 10am to 4pm.

Located in the Boca Raton Old City Hall, the society and museum resides in the town hall built by architect William Alsmeyer (originally designed by Addison Mizner before his bankruptcy) and was founded in 1972 by the Junior Service League (Currently known as the Junior League in Boca Raton.) The society also operates the Boca Express Train Museum and organizes the Florida East Coast Railway Station (currently named Count de Hoernle Pavilion). It was restored to offer public tours about its history. The historical society additionally runs an annual food and wine festival as a beneficiary in Boca Raton called the Boca Bacchanal.

== History ==
The Boca Raton Historical Society was created as a project incorporated by the Junior Service League in 1972, which had sparked the interest of creating a local historical museum in the Old City Hall. After two years, the society first led the Boca Raton Preservation Board project created by the city which preserved the Boca Raton Old City Hall, the Cloister Inn, the Mizner Administration Building, and the Florida East Coast Railway Station from any future destruction as they were designated as historically important. Over the span of a decade, the community started several projects to restore historical areas, including Singing Pines (also known as the Children's Museum), the relocation of the Cabana Club, the Boca Raton Old City Hall, and the F.E.C. Railway Station. By 1975, the city council of Boca Raton declares the Old Town Hall as a designated site in plans to becoming a historical museum in the future. During 1983, the historical society began the restoration for the Old Town Hall, and by November 1984, the restoration was complete as it received a $500,000 plus total of donations from corporations towards the redevelopment. The restoration effort was then awarded with the Florida Trust Award for Historic Preservation for preserving the historical site.

=== Florida East Coast Railroad Station ===
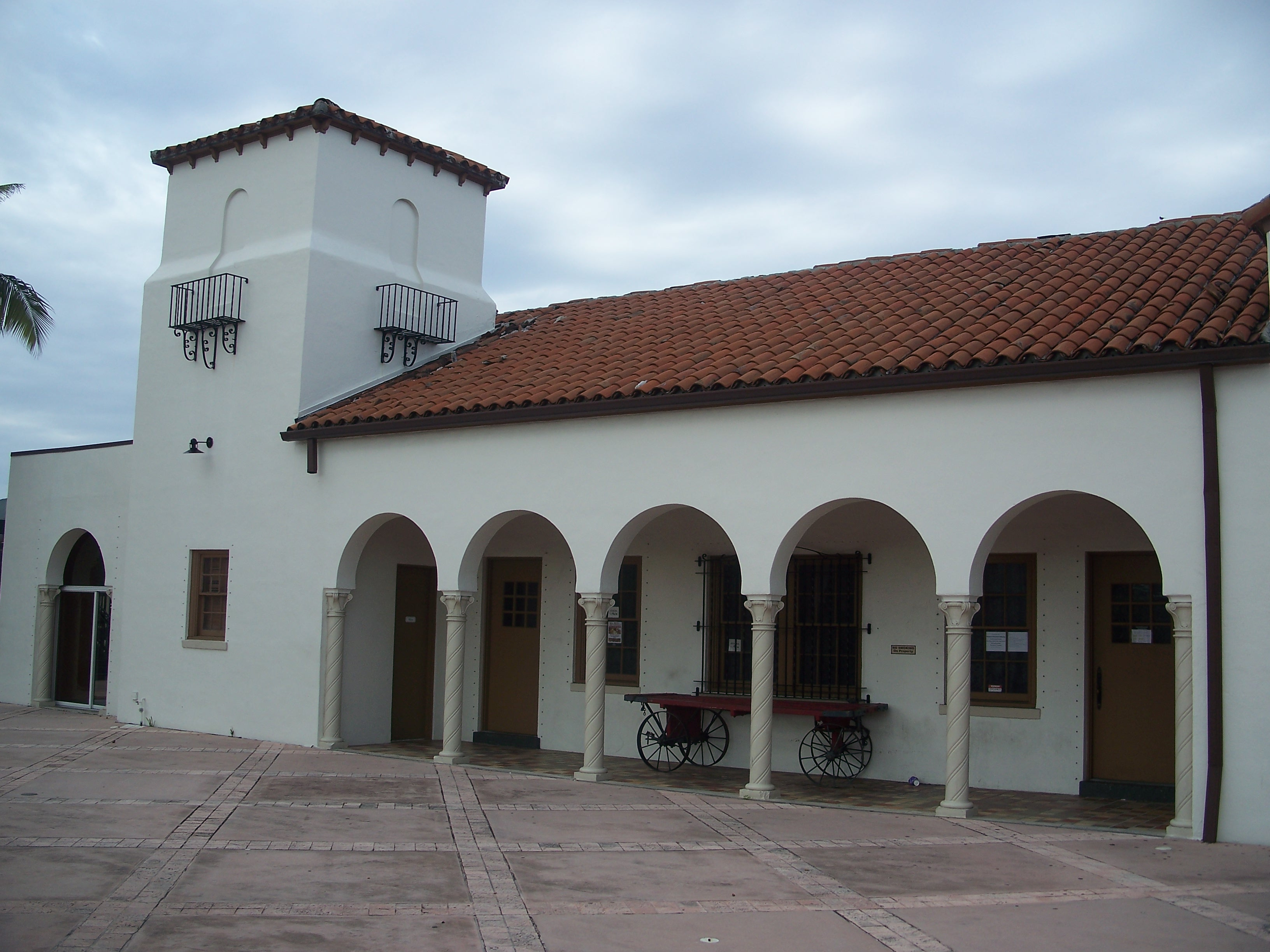
Building of the Boca Raton Express Museum

By 1985, the Boca Raton Community Redevelopment Agency purchases the Florida East Coast Railway Station from a Boca Raton restaurateur after it was previously sold by the Florida East Coast Railway company. The agency entrusted responsibility to the Boca Raton Historical Society for administering and raising funds to restore the railroad station. The society had completed their fundraising goal of earning nearly $1 million due to donations from the Boca Raton community, a $400,000 state grant, and a $500,000 donation from Countess de Hoernle in 1986. The railroad station was then renamed to Count de Hoernle Pavilion in recognition of the donation gifted from Countess de Hoernle. After a year, the members of the society restored four rail way cars, including a 1930 locomotive and caboose, as well as two streamline rail cars from 1947. Two years after the restoration, the historical society earned the Florida Trust Award for Historic Preservation due to their restoration efforts for the railroad station. By the year 2004, the historical society completed the interior restoration of the Boca Express Train Museum and publicly opens it for the first time.

== Mission statement ==
"The mission and purpose of the Boca Raton Historical Society is to collect, preserve, and present information and artifacts relevant to the past and evolving history of Boca Raton and to maintain a visible role in education and advocacy of historic preservation in our community."

== Services ==
=== Exhibits ===
The historical society operates exhibits including online exhibits such as 1909 Boca Raton, Mizner's Dream, and Pearl City. As of October 2018, the society is preparing installations for their new exhibition renovated in the Town Hall called History Alive!

=== Tours ===
The historical society and museum offers several tours that include the Boca Express Train Museum, Boca Raton Resort & Club, Historic Town Hall, and a seasonal Halloween themed walking tour at the Boca Raton Cemetery & Mausoleum. The society also offers virtual tours of Old Town Hall and other Boca Raton historic sites.

=== Educational programs ===
The historical society provides elementary schools their educational program named Ticket to Ride, which offers students various history tours of the Boca Express Train Museum. The program's curriculum involves educational training to help students prepare for standardized testing, such as the Next Generation Sunshine State Standards.

The society also offers free sessions discussing lesson plans exhibiting the local history of Boca Raton. It is taught in local schools such as Saint Paul Lutheran Church and School and is available online.

Tours for the Scouts involves visiting Town Hall or the Boca Express Train Museum and provides opportunities for scouts to obtain certain history badges.

=== Boca Bacchanal ===
The historical society hosts an annual spring food and wine festival for their major fundraising series in Boca Raton named the Boca Bacchanal. The event involves grand tasting and vintner diners from various professional chefs and vintners with well over 2,000 guests per year. All earnings from the event is benefited toward the Boca Raton Historical Society to provide an increasing growth in Boca Raton heritage educational programs for students, residents, and visitors. The festival has been a major fundraising for the Boca Raton Historical society since its establishment in 2003.

=== Walk of Recognition ===
The society is known for directing their annual celebration of recognized individuals and organizations that have served significance and commitment of improving the lives of Boca Raton citizens called the Walk of Recognition since 1997. Inductees are publicly nominated and selected by a group of judges determined by their impact as a community leader. The selected inductees have their name engraved into a black granite star and displayed on the Walk of Recognition memorial at Royal Palm Place. Each November, the event is held to honor the legacy of each and every Walk of Recognition recipient that have been a recognized important figure to Boca Raton.

== Collections ==
=== Photographs ===
The historical society currently holds approximately 16,000 photographs of Boca Raton's development during the 1900s to present day. This collection includes images of historic buildings, sites, farms, the Boca Raton Army Air Field, etc. The museums also possess a collection of old aerial photos of Boca which you can compare to newer present-day images.

=== Manuscripts ===
Approximately 200 manuscripts were collected by the society, including documents of pioneer farmers, developments of historical sites such as the Yamato Colony and Pearl City, and the Boca Raton Army Airfield during World War II.

=== Maps ===
The society holds a collection of roughly 500 maps published in Boca Raton dating through all eras.

=== Newspapers ===
The historical society preserves microfilmed copies of the Boca Raton News, and mimeographs of The Pelican, and Weekly Tattler. The newspapers are currently digitized and can be publicly viewed in their website.

=== Artifacts ===
The society preserves about 2,000 items of artifacts and memorabilia of World War II and including the first invented IBM Personal Computer in Boca Raton. The society also preserves a collection of more than 150 furniture and decorations from Mizner Industries displayed in the Old Town Hall. One of the special pieces the society holds is a Maxwell House coffee can that was salvaged from a merchant ship that had been attacked by a U-boat off the coast of Boca Raton.

=== Oral history ===
The society holds approximately 120 oral history copies that have been collected from local pioneers of the Pearl City research project (Boca Raton's first historical black community) which contributed to the works of the 1990 book Pearl City, Florida: A Black Community Remembers.

=== Reference books ===
The society contains roughly 600 copies of volumes relating to Florida's history of preserving history and architecture for research purposes. Periodicals such as the Tequesta, The Florida Historical Quarterly, and the Spanish River Papers, which is an academic journal published by the Boca Raton Historical Society.

== Board members ==
- Hank Jawhari, President
- Kirsten Stephenson, Vice-President
- Denise Alman, Secretary
- Loren Mintz, Treasurer
- Bill Lane, Assistant Treasurer

== See also ==
- List of historical societies in Florida
