= Brevard Symphony Orchestra =

Brevard Symphony Orchestra (BSO)
- Orchestra
- Founded: 1954
- Concert hall: King Center, Melbourne, Florida
- Principal conductor: Christopher Confessore
- Website: www.brevardsymphony.com

The Brevard Symphony Orchestra performs at the King Center, Melbourne, Florida, as its orchestra-in-residence. The Center seats 1,880. BSO features an average of 65 paid musicians. The BSO offices are located at 780 South Apollo Blvd. in Melbourne.

== History ==
In January 1954, an orchestra was needed to provide the accompaniment for a performance of The Mikado, which was being presented by the Northrop Glee Club. Thirteen musicians assembled for this purpose under the direction of Frederick Jaehne and called themselves the Brevard Light Concert Orchestra. After the conclusion of the show, they decided to remain together permanently.

Concerts were held regularly for the next several years. In 1966, the Brevard Symphony Orchestra (BSO) incorporated as a non-profit organization. Joseph Kreines took over as conductor and implemented the first season series.

In 1969, a board of directors from the community was formed. Maria Tunicka served as music director and conductor of the BSO from 1976 to 1986. In 1986, the board of directors hired Kypros Markou for this position. During the 1987–88 season, Maestro Markou led the first performances of the BSO in the new Brevard Performing Arts Center (now known as the King Center for the Performing Arts), where the orchestra has been designated "orchestra-in-residence".

In the spring of 1994, Kypros Markou announced his departure. In 1995, the board of directors appointed Christopher Confessore as the new music director and principal conductor. Confessore continues to lead the BSO as well as currently holding the position of associate conductor of the Alabama Symphony Orchestra.

For many years, the administrative offices of the Brevard Symphony Orchestra were located in a building located at 1500 Highland Avenue, Melbourne. This structure is known as the Winchester Symphony House and was built in 1886. There has been extensive renovation on the building over the years and it is currently listed as a Historical Site for Brevard County and the State of Florida. The BSO relocated its current offices in 2018.

== Educational outreach ==
The Brevard Symphony Orchestra, partnering with the Brevard County School Board and through support received from local foundations and businesses, offers a free symphonic concert at the King Center each February for all 5th grade public school students. A study guide is developed for music teachers that integrate all learning aspects of a symphony performance from biographies of the composers to seating within the orchestra, performance etiquette. This information is blended, with musical examples, into class lesson plans. For many students this is their first visit to the King Center for the Performing Arts as well as their first symphonic performance. All Study Guide materials incorporate the Sunshine State Standards and connection to Florida Comprehensive Assessment Test curriculum. This concert is open to private and home school students.

The Brevard Symphony Orchestra also hosts two free concerts in the community a year: the Free Family Concert and July 4 Symphony Under the Stars. The Free Family Concert takes place in February each year at the King Center. This concert is approximately one hour long with no intermission featuring pieces the whole family will enjoy. The Symphony Under the Stars concert takes place at Cocoa Riverfront Park in Cocoa, Florida and includes fireworks display in addition to a patriotic orchestral performance.

== Operations ==
In 2009, it had a budget of $726,000. The BSO celebrated its 70th Anniversary Season in 2023–2024. Christopher Confessore celebrated his 29th season as music director during the 2023–2024 season.
