= Old St. Andrew's Episcopal Church =

Historic church in Florida, United States

- St. Andrew's Episcopal Church
- U.S. National Register of Historic Places
- St. Andrew's Church building in 2008

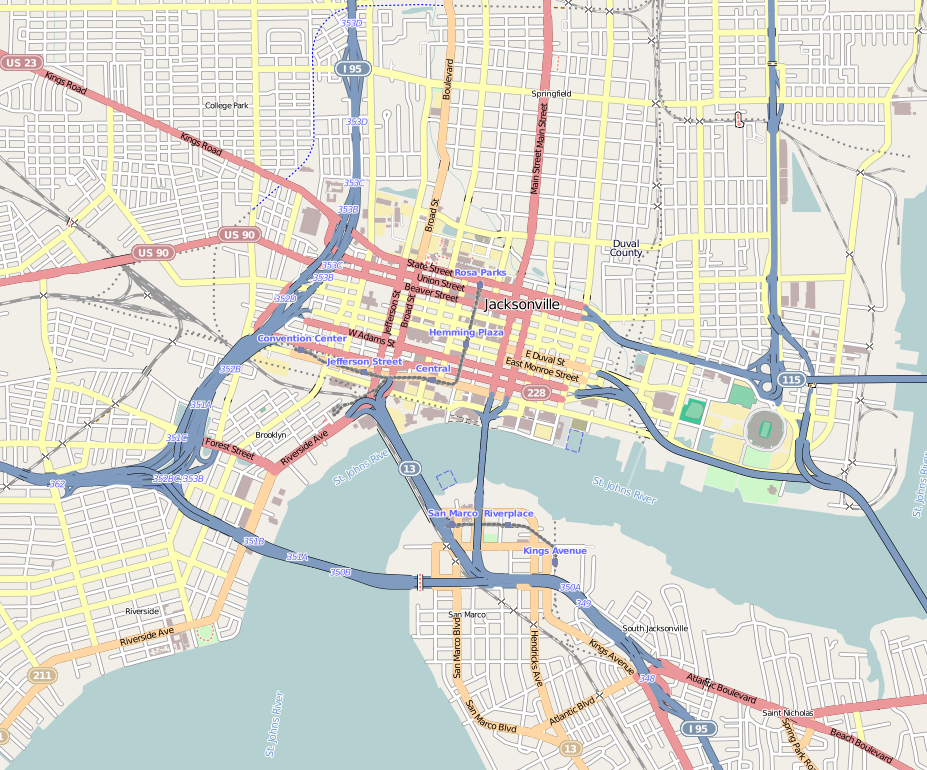
- Location within Central Jacksonville Location within Florida
- Location: 317 A. Philip Randolph Blvd., Jacksonville, Florida
- Coordinates: 30°19′32″N 81°38′37″W
- Built: 1887
- Architect: Robert S. Schuyler
- Architectural style: Late Gothic Revival
- NRHP reference No.: 76000593
- Added to NRHP: May 4, 1976

The former St. Andrew's Episcopal Church building, also known as Old St. Andrew's Event Venue, is an historic building located at 317 Florida Avenue (now 317 A. Philip Randolph Boulevard) in downtown Jacksonville, Florida. It was originally an Episcopal church, but closed when the parish relocated to the suburbs in 1960. On May 4, 1976, the edifice was added to the U.S. National Register of Historic Places. In the 1990s it was purchased by the City of Jacksonville and turned over to the Jacksonville Historical Society (JHS), and now serves as an event venue managed by the society.

== History ==
St. Andrew's Episcopal Church was designed by architect Robert S. Schuyler in the Gothic Revival style. Schuyler also designed St. Peter's Church in Fernandina, built in 1881, as well as chapels in Waldo, Fairbanks, Pablo Beach, and Lake Santa Fe. St. Andrew's was built in 1887 on a single level using brick masonry and contained a massive front corner tower with louvered belfry and steep spire roof. It stood at 317 Florida Avenue, now 317 A. Philip Randolph Boulevard. The architecture was praised in the 1889 edition of King's Handbook of Notable Episcopal Churches in the United States:

This new Church ... is regarded as one of the most satisfying pieces of architecture in the South. It is built of pressed brick laid in black mortar, the trimmings being of stone. The ground plan is cruciform, the vestry-room on one side and the organ-chamber on the other forming the transepts. The chancel and nave are separated by three arches of masonry. The chancel, in addition to the usual furniture, has seats for a vested choir of forty voices. The interior woodwork of the building is Florida pine, carefully selected and as carefully put together. The doors, a special gift, are made of solid mahogany. The ceiling is panelled with yellow pine. The tower rises to a height of 120 feet, and is the highest now in the city.

St. Andrew's Episcopal Church c. 1910

St. Andrews was the only major church in the city that survived the Great Fire of 1901.

=== Economic boom ===
Beginning with World War II, the area along the river north of the city center experienced an economic boom as dozens of industrial operations moved in. Liberty Ships were built to support the war effort. The Gator Bowl Stadium was erected in 1949 and construction began on the Mathews Bridge, which opened in 1953. Jacksonville Baseball Park began construction in 1954. The once quiet neighborhood had become undesirable, and residents began to move elsewhere. Residential development in the suburbs increased dramatically, and membership at St. Andrews fell to the point that it could no longer support itself. The Arlington Mission of the Episcopal Diocese of Florida was created in July 1959, and in January 1960, it was renamed St. Andrew's and all the furnishings and memorials of the old St. Andrew's were moved to 7801 Lone Star Road.

Old St. Andrew's Episcopal Church was deconsecrated, closed and boarded up. The once thriving area around the church declined, and by the late 1970s the building had fallen into disuse and disrepair. Vacant for almost three decades, the building was a tremendous challenge for historic preservation. The situation changed with the arrival of the Jacksonville Jaguars NFL team, as the City of Jacksonville purchased most of the land around Jacksonville Municipal Stadium, including the Old St. Andrew's site.

== Rebirth ==
The City of Jacksonville gave the Jacksonville Historical Society the rights to the building to restore it. According to the JHS website, many people thought that the condition of the structure was beyond repair. However, a $242,000 preservation grant was secured from the state of Florida in 1996, and a challenge grant from the Weaver Foundation helped the JHS to raise $1 million to complete the project. Restoration began in 1996 and was completed on April 18, 1998, with the structure becoming the new home of the Jacksonville Historical Society. Since restoration the building is seen as one of the finest specimens of nineteenth-century architecture in Duval County, and it is a popular spot for meetings, weddings and other civic events. It was the site of the ESPN Super Bowl XXXIX party in January 2005.
