= Alice A. W. Cadwallader =

American philanthropist and temperance activist (1832–1910)

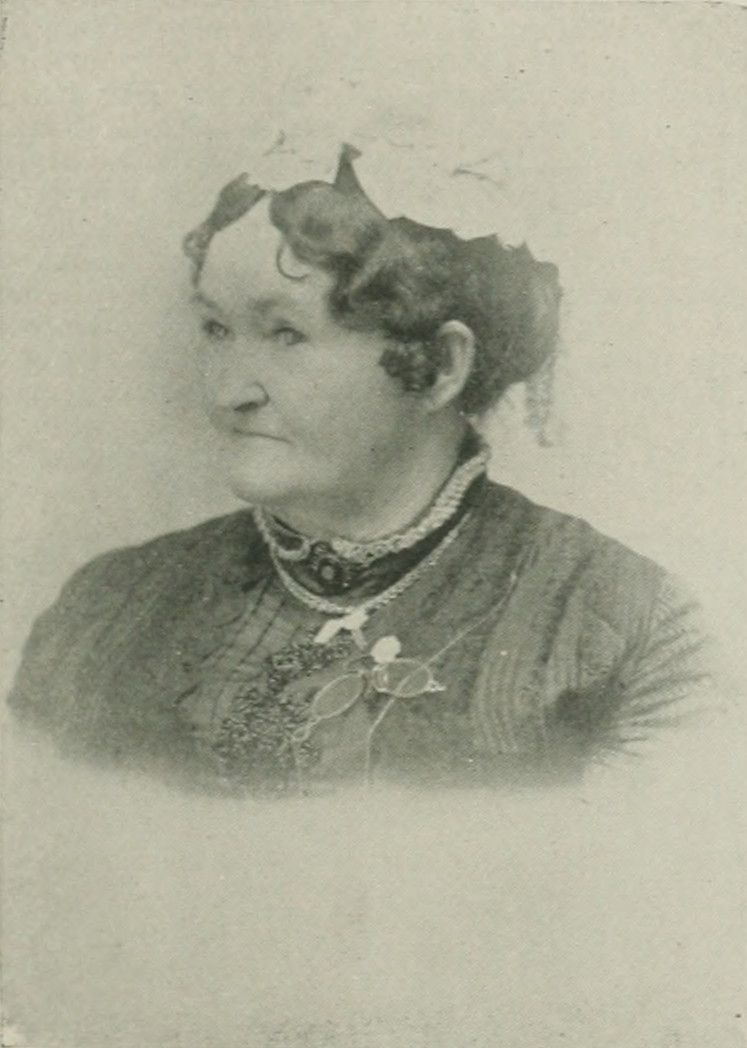
- "A Woman of the Century"
- Born: Alice Ann Moorehouse; 1832; St. Clairsville, Ohio, U.S.
- Died: May 20, 1910 (aged 77–78); Montreat, North Carolina, U.S.
- Occupations: philanthropist; temperance activist
- Organizations: Woman's Christian Temperance Union (Florida state president); Good Templars (Vice-Templar)
- Board member of: St. Luke's Hospital; Orphanage and Home for the Friendless (Jacksonville, Florida)
- Spouses: Francis Cochran (m. 1848; died 1853); Nathan J. White (m. 1857; died 1862); Joseph Cadwallader (m. 1824; died 1904)

Alice A. W. Cadwallader (née, Moorehouse; after first marriage, Cochran; after second marriage White; after third marriage, Cadwallader; 1832 – May 20, 1910) was an American philanthropist and temperance activist. She served in Florida as state president of the Woman's Christian Temperance Union (WCTU).

== Early life ==
Alice Ann Moorehouse was born in St. Clairsville, Ohio, in 1832. Her father, George Washington Moorehouse (ca. 1805 - 1888), was of English descent, and her mother, Elizabeth Linder (1807-1887), of German descent, came from Rutland, Vermont. Alice was one of a family of twelve children, her siblings being, Philo, Charles Roxcenia, George, John, Abigail, Louisa, Cornelius, Parker, Lucretia, and William. Alcoholic liquors -beverage, flavoring, and medicine- were not allowed in the family home and at an early age, Alice became a "Daughter of Temperance".

While still a teenager, on September 17, 1848, in Belmont County, Ohio, she married Francis Cochran (1824-1853), a Virginian, who died in 1853, leaving her with a family of three small children.

On April 12, 1857, in Washington, Iowa, she married Nathan J. White (1837-1862), who hailed from a Belmont County Quaker family. He enlisted as one of the sixty-days soldiers at the beginning of the civil war, and was killed in the battle of Antietam (Sharpsburg, Maryland, September 17, 1862).

== Career ==
Mrs. White went with her children to the house of her father, in Mount Pleasant, Iowa, where she gave her time to patriotic work. She first took charge of the sanitary supplies of Jefferson Barracks at Lemay, Missouri . After one year's service there, the Sanitary Commission placed her in charge of the supplies of the hospital steamer R. C. Wood, and a year later, she was removed to the control of the large Light-diet Kitchen in Jeffersonville, Indiana. Putting that in complete running order, she next removed to Nashville, Tennessee, and under General George Henry Thomas took charge of the work and supplies of the White Women Refugee's Hospital.

In 1866, she returned to her father's home in Mount Pleasant, Iowa. Subsequently, she spent a year and a half in temperance work in western New York. Her next movement was to turn pioneer. In company with one of her brothers, she settled in Nebraska, preëmpting a homestead, on which she lived two years. During that period and for two years afterward, she filled the office of Grand Vice-Templar in the order of Good Templars, and for the three years following, she was the general superintendent of the juvenile work in the same organization.

Then the Women's Crusade spirit fired the Postbellum West, and, setting aside her Good Templar work, with other women, she joined in the temperance crusade against the saloons in Lincoln, Nebraska. Since that period, she was very involved with the WCTU.

In 1880, in Lincoln, Nebraska, she married Rev. Joseph Cadwallader (1824–1904), of the Congregational church. On account of his failing health, they removed to Jacksonville, Florida, where in 1886, she was made president of the State WCTU. In that office, she increased the growth of work and the appreciation of the power of woman in the world's progress and philanthropies. She was assisted by her husband until Rev. Cadwallader was almost as well known in WCTU circles as his wife. In October 1887, in her role as Florida WCTU president, she was detained from attending the National WCTU conference in Nashville due to the sickness of her father.

In addition to her temperance activism, Mrs. Cadwallader entered into church service and philanthropic work in Jacksonville. She was an active member of St. Luke's Hospital board of managers, composed entirely of women, and she served on the board of the Orphanage and Home for the Friendless. In addition, she was associated with missionary and jail activities. During 1890, when she was traveling with her husband, she kept busy everywhere, in addition to providing constant oversight of her work in Florida.

Mrs. Cadwallader resigned her position as president of the Florida WCTU to engage in the establishment of the Woman's Industrial Home in Augusta, Georgia. She and her husband donated considerable financial support, and it became a successful institution. After relocating to Asheville, North Carolina, she attended the WCTU Assembly of 1898 in Saint Paul, Minnesota, and made reports of the meetings to the state paper, The Telephone. With Mrs. Kells, of Florida, Mrs. Cadwallader made a 2 miles (3.2 km) climb to speak with the residents of the Blue Ridge Mountains regarding temperance.

== Death ==
Alice A. W. Cadwallader died of heart failure at her home in Montreat, North Carolina, May 20, 1910. She was buried at Riverside Cemetery in Asheville, North Carolina. She was survived by two sons.
