= Senator Fairbanks (disambiguation) =

Charles W. Fairbanks (1852–1918) was a U.S. senator from Indiana from 1897 to 1905. He was also the vice president of the United States under President Theodore Roosevelt from 1905 to 1909.

Senator Fairbanks may also refer to:

- George Rainsford Fairbanks (1820–1906), Florida State Senate
- Horace Fairbanks (1820–1888), Vermont State Senate
