= The Grove (Rhinebeck, New York) =

Historic house in New York, United States

- U.S. National Register of Historic Places
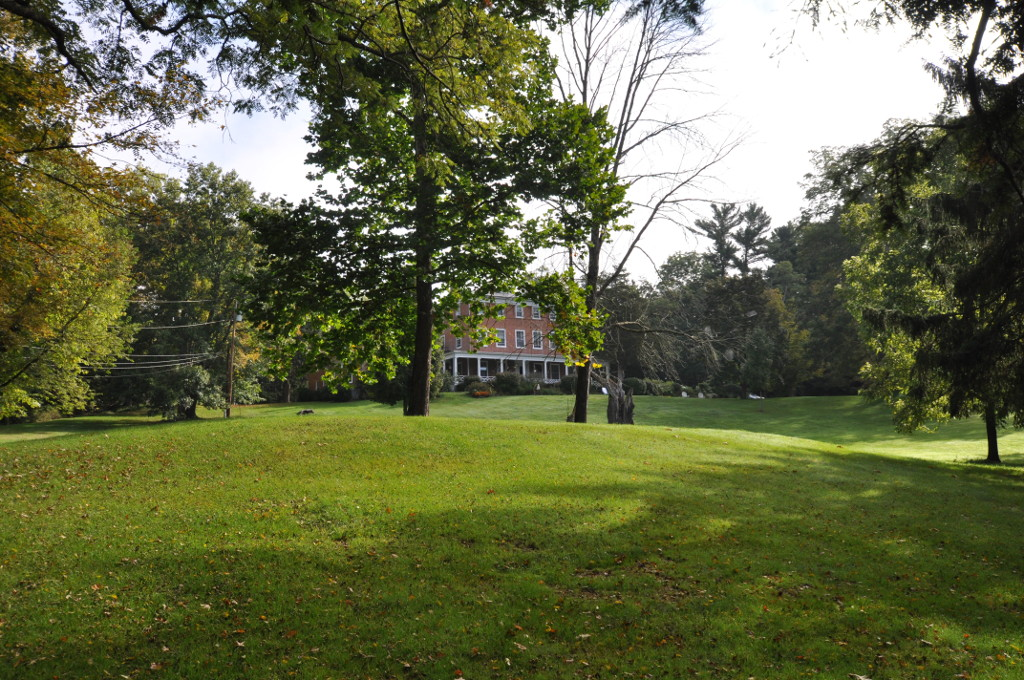

- Location within New York Location within the United States
- Location: Jct. of Miller Rd. and NY 308, Rhinebeck, New York
- Coordinates: 41°56′24″N 73°52′40″W
- Area: 20.9 acres (8.5 ha)
- Built: 1795
- Architect: McKim, Mead & White
- MPS: Rhinebeck Town MRA
- NRHP reference No.: 87001094
- Added to NRHP: July 9, 1987

The Grove (ca. 1795) was the country seat of Philip Jeremiah Schuyler and, subsequently, Mary Morton Miller in Rhinebeck, New York, United States, The original section of the Grove is two-story, five-bay, center-hall structure designed in the Federal style.

Schuyler was married to Sarah Rutsen, and the land had been in the Rutsen family. The Landsman Kill, running through the property, had been the site of the Rutsen family's grist and saw mills, important settlement period industrial concerns in Rhinebeck during the early- to mid-eighteenth century. Schuyler acquired the mills, which he continued to operate, and a large parcel of land upon which he erected his elegant Federal style mansion. (The subsequent evolution of the Grove, in form, scale and decorative detailing, and its nineteenth-century historical associations place its primary significance in a later period as a 19th-century country seat. A carriage house on the property was built in the 1890s and is attributed to the architectural firm of McKim, Mead & White.

It was added to the National Register of Historic Places in 1987.
