= Clearwater Historical Society (Clearwater, Florida) =

US non-profit organization

- Type: Historical Society
- Headquarters: Clearwater Historical Society Museum and Cultural Center
- Location(s): 610 S Fort Harrison Clearwater, Florida 33756 Mailing address PO Box 175 Clearwater, Florida 33757
- Members: Ind : $35 Duel $50 Family $65 Settlers $1,000
- president: Allison Dolan VP Jay Rhodes
- Key people: Liz Childress, Lila Grant, Lorelei Keif, Doug Kelly, Lisa Millsaps, Suz Priest, Dean Robinson, Tres Susan Raineri, Jeanne Holmquest PP Bill Wallace
- Website: www.clearwaterhistoricalsociety.org

The Clearwater Historical Society is an organization that researches and preserves the past of the city of Clearwater, Florida.

The society was started in 1978 by friends and neighbors that wanted to save the history. In 1983, the society moved to the historic Plumb House, 1380 South Martin Luther King Jr. Avenue, Clearwater. In 2014, the society signed a lease with the Pinellas County School Board to lease the old South Ward School. In June 2019, a museum and cultural center was opened with 5 acres (2.0 ha) and six buildings. The front building that houses the museum was built in 1906, the first school paid for with Public Funds. The second building was the first Clearwater High School. It remained a high school until 1924 when the second Clearwater High School was built on Greenwood Ave. The cafeteria was built in 1958 followed by Medis Center (now the Event Center) the kindergarten room, and three smaller buildings in 1971, which now house the office and archives. The museum and cultural center is run by volunteers and donations. The Plumb House is also home of the Plumb House Museum.

== See also ==
- List of historical societies in Florida
