= Plumb House (Clearwater, Florida) =

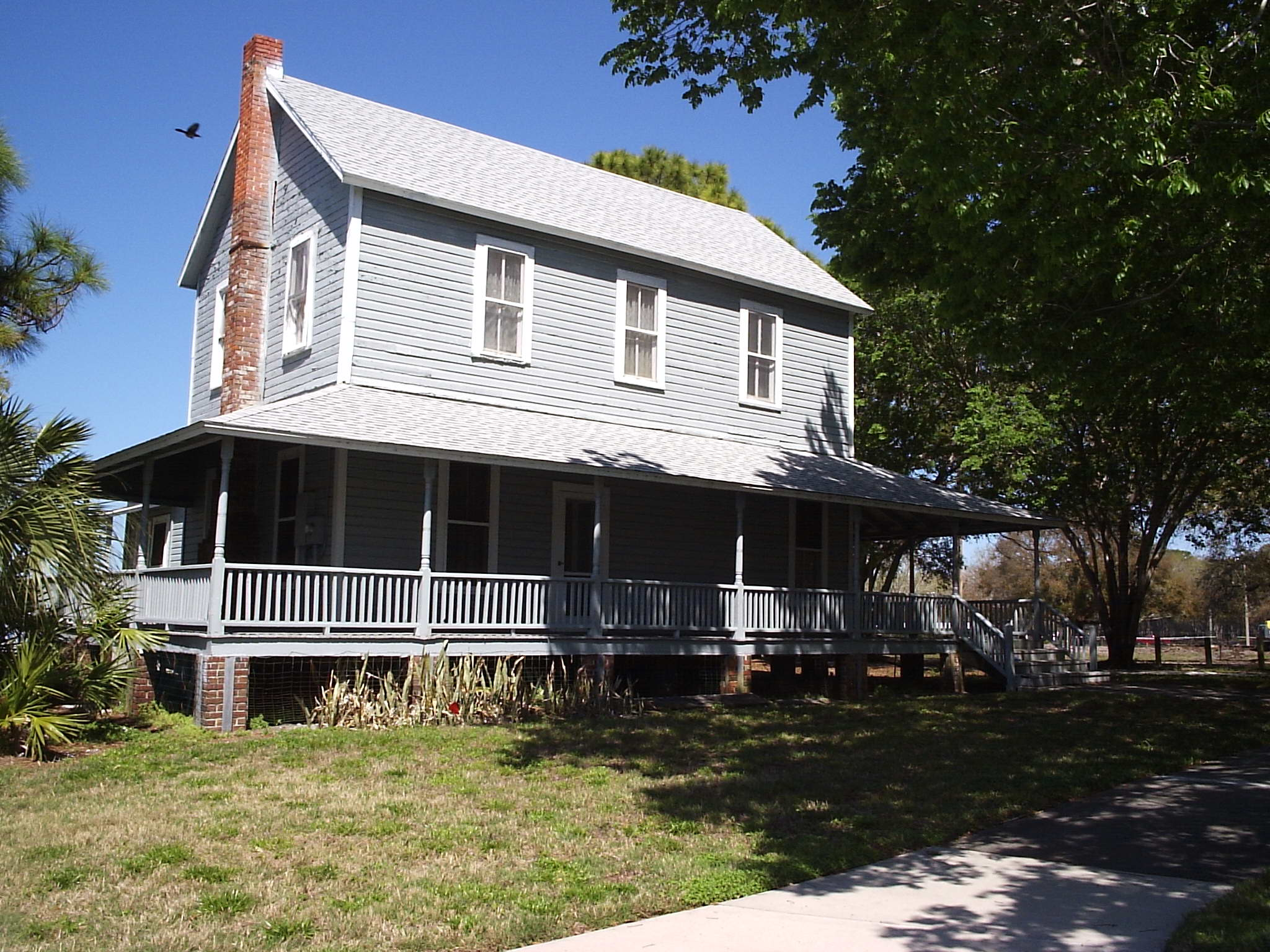
- Interactive map of the Plumb House area

General information
- Type: House
- Architectural style: Florida Cracker
- Location: 1380 South Martin Luther; King Jr. Avenue; Clearwater, Florida
- Coordinates: 27.94895°N 82.791708°W
- Construction started: c. 1896
- Governing body: Clearwater Historical Society

The Plumb House is a historic U.S home originally located on the northwest corner of Lakeview and South Fort Harrison Avenues in Clearwater, Florida. The house was built in about 1896 and used as a paint store on the ground level and apartments on the second floor. In December 1983, the house was moved to its current location at 1380 South Martin Luther King Jr. Avenue in Clearwater, and serves as the home for the Clearwater Historical Society and the Plumb House Museum.

== Plumb House Museum ==
The Plumb House Museum houses vintage furnishings, historic artifacts and photographs.

== See also ==
- Clearwater Historical Society
