= 1907 Connecticut Aggies football team =

American college football season

1907 Connecticut Aggies football
- Conference: Athletic League of New England State Colleges
- Record: 2–5 (0–1 New England)
- Head coach: George H. Lamson (2nd season)
- Home stadium: Athletic Fields

The 1907 Connecticut Aggies football team represented the Connecticut Agricultural College, now the University of Connecticut, in the 1907 college football season. The Aggies were led by second-year head coach George H. Lamson, and completed the season with a record of 2–5.

== Schedule ==
Date	Opponent	Site	Result	Attendance	Source
October 5	at Cushing Academy*	Ashburnham, MA	L 0–25		
October 12	Wesleyan freshmen*	Athletic Fields; Storrs, CT	L 0–17		
October 19	at Springfield Training School*	Springfield, MA	L 0–41		
October 26	at Williston*	Easthampton, MA	L 4–33		
November 9	Norwich Free Academy*	Athletic Fields; Storrs, CT	W 39–0	200	
November 16	at New London A.C.*	New London, CT	W 28–0		
November 23	at Rhode Island State	Kingston, RI (rivalry)	L 0–42		
*Non-conference game
