= 1906 Connecticut Aggies football team =

American college football season

1906 Connecticut Aggies football
- Conference: Athletic League of New England State Colleges
- Record: 2–4 (0–1 New England)
- Head coach: George H. Lamson (1st season)
- Home stadium: Athletic Fields

The 1906 Connecticut Aggies football team represented Connecticut Agricultural College, now the University of Connecticut, in the 1906 college football season. The Aggies were led by first-year head coach George H. Lamson, and completed the season with a record of 2–4.

== Schedule ==
Date	Opponent	Site	Result	Source
September 29	at New Britain High School*	New Britain, CT	L 5–11	
October 6	at Hartford Public High School*	Hartford, CT	L 0–15	
October 27	at New Hampshire	Durham, NH	L 0–40	
November 3	at Norwich Free Academy*	Norwich, CT	W 29–0	
November 17	at Holyoke High School*	Holyoke, MA	W 16–5	
	Worcester High School*		L 0–4	
*Non-conference game
