= List of historical societies in Florida =

The following is a list of historical societies in the state of Florida, United States.

== Organizations ==
- Alger-Sullivan Historical Society
- Altamonte Springs Historical Society
- Apalachicola Area Historical Society
- Historical Society of Avon Park
- Apopka Historical Society
- Baker County Historical Society
- Boca Raton Historical Society
- Brevard County Historical Commission
- Cedar Key Historical Society
- Central Florida Society for Historic Preservation
- Historical Society of Central Florida
- Citrus County Historical Society
- City of Orlando Historic Preservation
- Clearwater Historical Society
- Delray Beach Historical Society
- Dunedin Historical Society
- East Hillsborough Historical Society
- Eustis Historical Museum & Preservation Society
- Florida Baptist Historical Society
- Florida Historical Society
- Fort Lauderdale Historical Society
- Geneva Historical Society
- Goldenrod Historical Society, Inc.
- Gulf Breeze Area Historical Society
- Gulfport Historical Society
- Haitian American Historical Society
- Indian Rocks Beach Historical Society
- Jacksonville Historical Society
- Key West Art & Historical Society
- Longboat Key Historical Society
- Loxahatchee River Historical Society
- Maitland Historical Society
- Mandarin Museum & Historical Society
- Marco Island Historical Society
- Micanopy Historical Society
- Naples Historical Society
- Historical Society of North Brevard
- Oakland Park Historical Society
- Oviedo Historical Society, Inc.
- Historical Society of Palm Beach County
- Panhandle Preservation Alliance
- Pensacola Historical Society
- Pine Castle Historical Society
- Pompano Beach Historical Society
- Sanford Historical Society
- Santa Rosa Historical Society in Bagdad
- Historical Society Of Sarasota County
- Sebring Historical Society
- Seminole County Historical Commission
- Seminole County Historical Society
- South Brevard Historical Society
- Southeast Volusia Historical Society
- Southwest Florida Historical Society
- St. Augustine Historical Society
- Tarpon Springs Area Historical Society
- Washington County Historical & Preservation Society
- West Pasco Historical Society

== See also ==
- History of Florida
- List of museums in Florida
- National Register of Historic Places listings in Florida
- List of historical societies in the United States
