= Fairbanks House (Fernandina Beach, Florida) =

Historic house in Florida, United States

- The Fairbanks House
- U.S. National Register of Historic Places
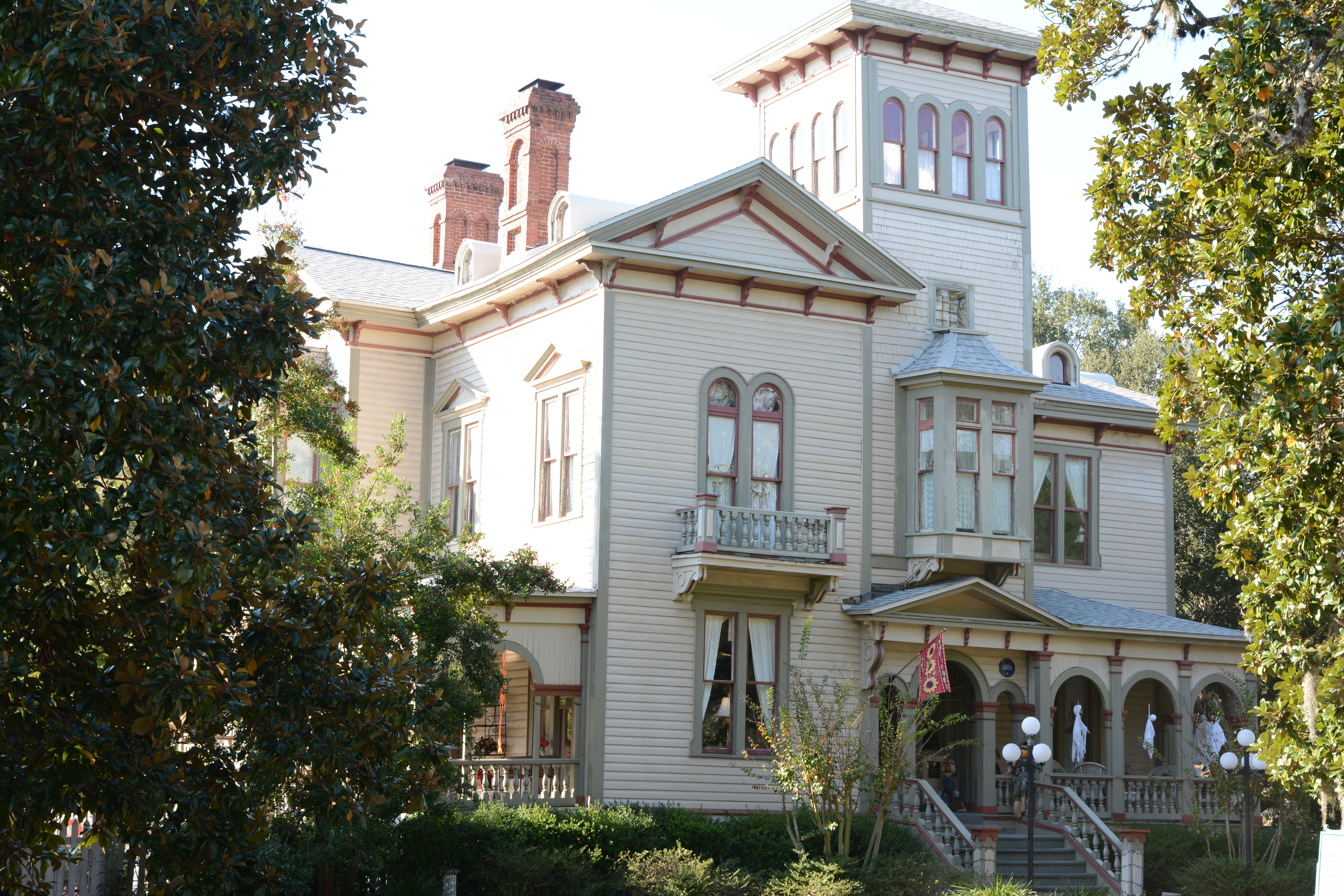

- Location within Florida Location within the United States
- Location: Fernandina Beach, Florida
- Coordinates: 30.66736°N 81.46055°W
- Built: 1885
- Architect: R. V. Schuyler
- Architectural style: Italianate
- NRHP reference No.: 73000592
- Added to NRHP: June 4, 1973

The Fairbanks House (also known as the Maj. George R. Fairbanks House) is a historic site in Fernandina Beach, Florida. It was built in 1885 for George Rainsford Fairbanks. R. S. Schuyler was the building's architect. It is located at 227 South 7th Street. On June 4, 1973, it was added to the U.S. National Register of Historic Places. Built as a surprise for his wife, it was reported not to have gone over well and became known as "Fairbanks Folly".

It operates as the Fairbanks House Bed & Breakfast.

== Gallery ==
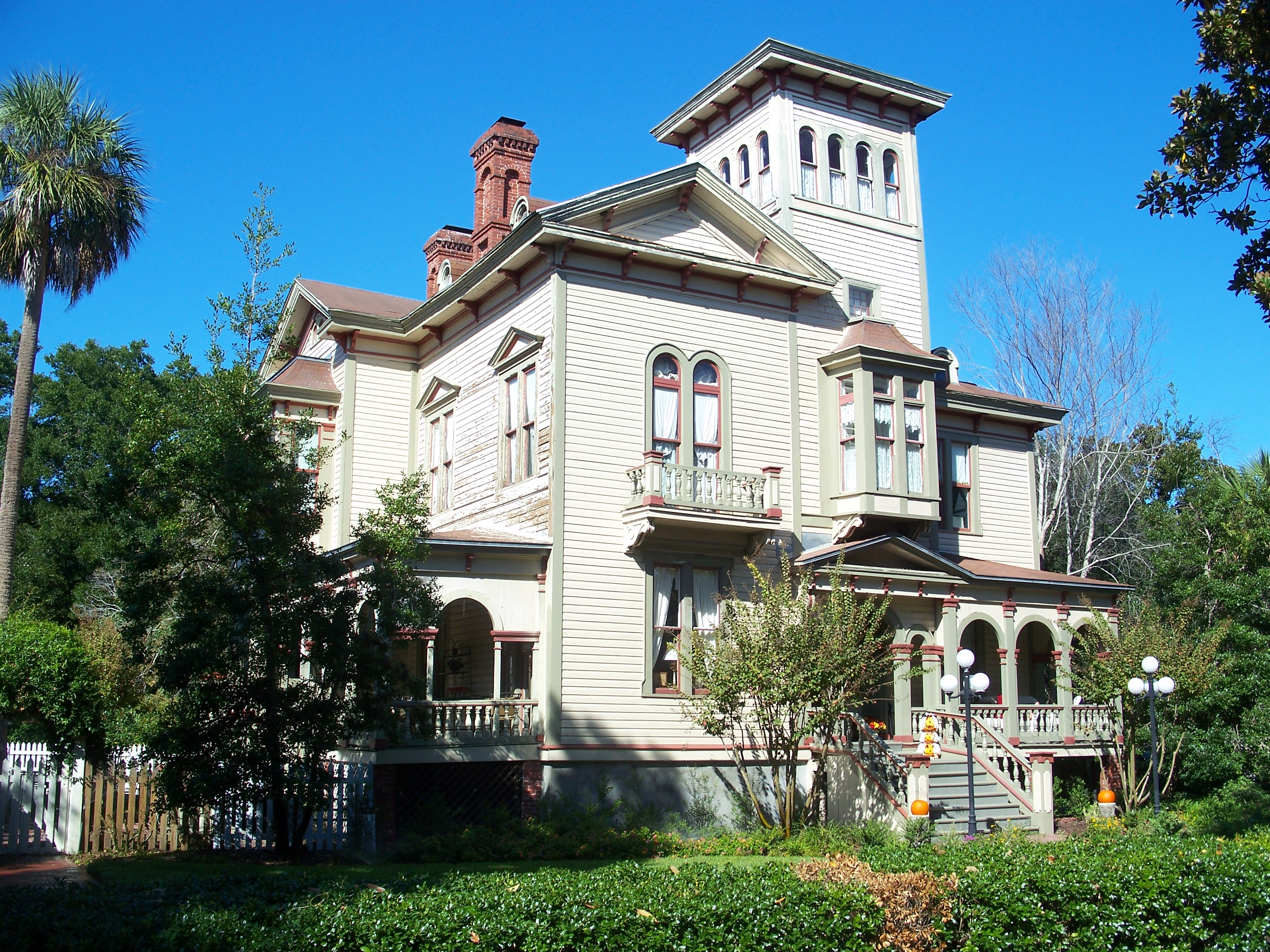

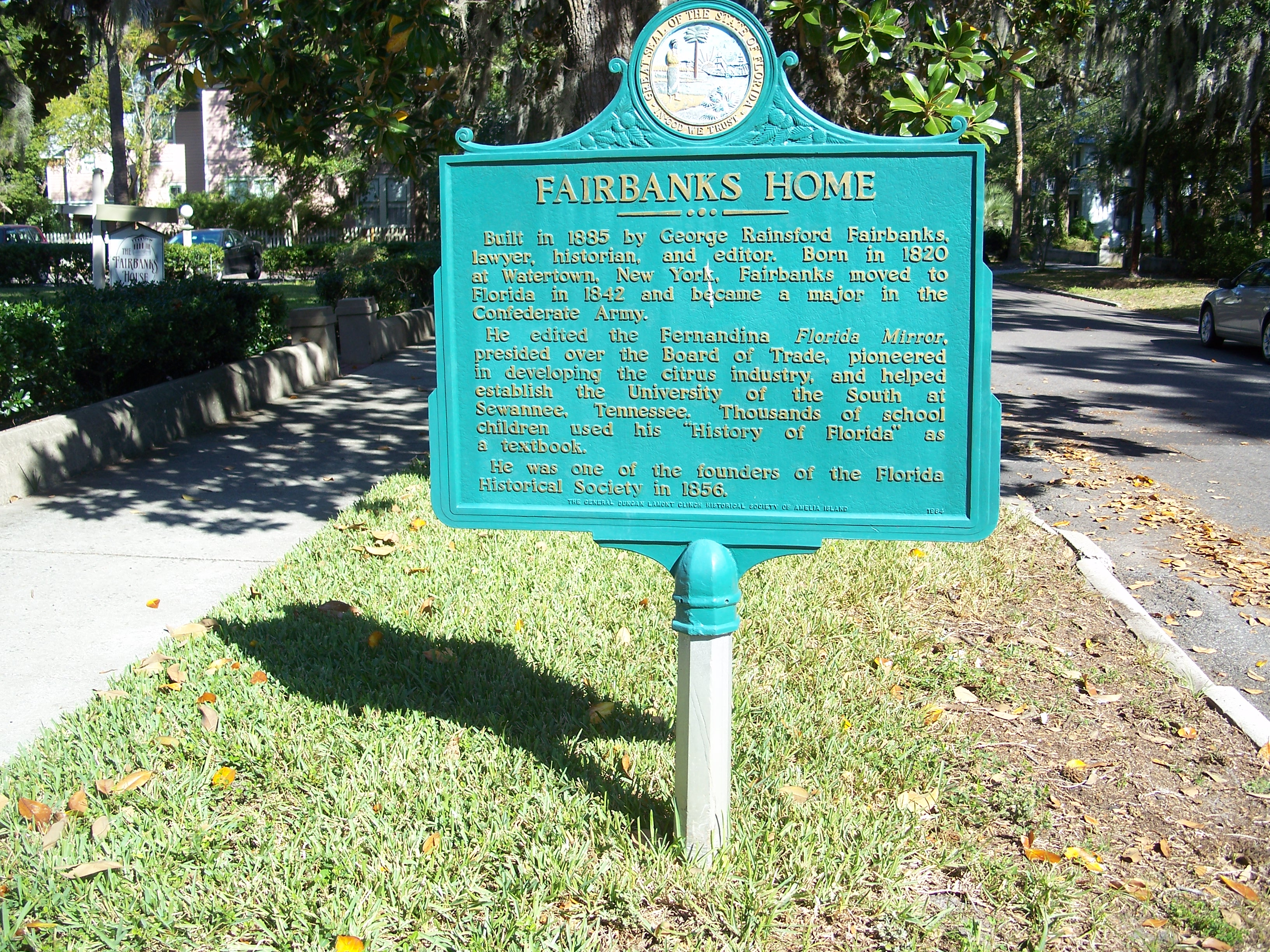
Marker outside The Fairbanks House
