= Old St. Luke's Hospital =

- U.S. National Register of Historic Places
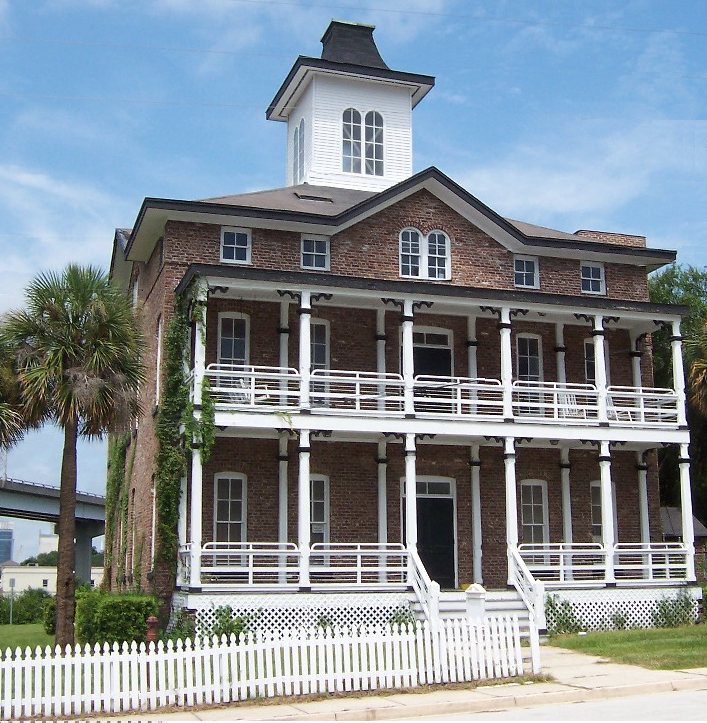

- Location within Florida Location within the United States
- Location: Jacksonville, Florida, USA
- Coordinates: 30°19′33″N 81°38′49″W
- NRHP reference No.: 72000310
- Added to NRHP: July 24, 1972

The Old St. Luke's Hospital is a historic U.S. hospital in Jacksonville, Florida. It is located at 314 North Palmetto Street. The hospital was originally built in 1878 at a cost of about $6,000. On July 24, 1972, it was added to the U.S. National Register of Historic Places.

The building currently houses the archives of the Jacksonville Historical Society.

== Notable people ==
- Martha Reed Mitchell (1818-1902), philanthropist

== See also ==
- St. Vincent's Medical Center Southside, formerly known as St. Luke's Hospital
