= George H. Lamson =

American sports coach and museum curator

Biographical details
- Born: April 8, 1882; Malden, Massachusetts, U.S.
- Died: December 4, 1931 (aged 49); New York City, U.S.
- Education: Massachusetts, Yale

Playing career

Baseball
- 1900–1902: Connecticut
- Position: Shortstop

Coaching career (HC unless noted)

Football
- 1906–1907: Connecticut

Baseball
- 1906–1908: Connecticut

Head coaching record
- Overall: 4–9 (football); 12–13–1 (baseball)

George Herbert Lamson Jr. (April 8, 1882 – December 4, 1931) was an American football and baseball coach and museum curator. He served as the head football coach at the University of Connecticut from 1906 to 1907, compiling a record of 4–9. He was also the head baseball coach at Connecticut from 1906 to 1908, tallying a mark of 12–13–1. Lamson was a star shortstop on the baseball team at Connecticut before graduating in 1902. Lamson was found dead on December 4, 1931, at the Taft Hotel in New York City.

== Head coaching record ==
=== Football ===
Year	Team	Overall	Conference	Standing	Bowl/playoffs
Connecticut Aggies (Athletic League of New England State Colleges) (1906–1907)
1906	Connecticut	2–4	0–1		
1907	Connecticut	2–5	0–1		
Connecticut:		4–9	0–2		
Total:		4–9			
