= Sunshine State Standards =

Educational standards in the U.S. state of Florida

The Sunshine State Standards (now called Next Generation Sunshine State Standards or NGSSS) describe the knowledge or ability that a student should be able to demonstrate by the end of every grade level from first grade through twelfth grade. These standards cover eight content areas: English Language Arts, Mathematics, Science, Social Studies, Physical Education, World Languages, Fine Arts, and Health Education. The standards are subdivided into "benchmarks," which outline the specific content, knowledge, and skills that students are expected to learn in school. As of 2020, the Sunshine State Standards have been superseded by the Florida B.E.S.T. Standards, following the repeal of the state’s prior standards framework. The curriculum of most public schools in the State of Florida and the FCAT are based upon this state system.

Development of the Sunshine State Standards began in 1993, and they were adopted by the Florida Board of Education in May 1996. The conceptual framework draft was released in 2010 and the final framework was released in 2011. This framework was used to complete the NGSSS which were published in 2013.
