= Philip Jeremiah Schuyler =

American politician

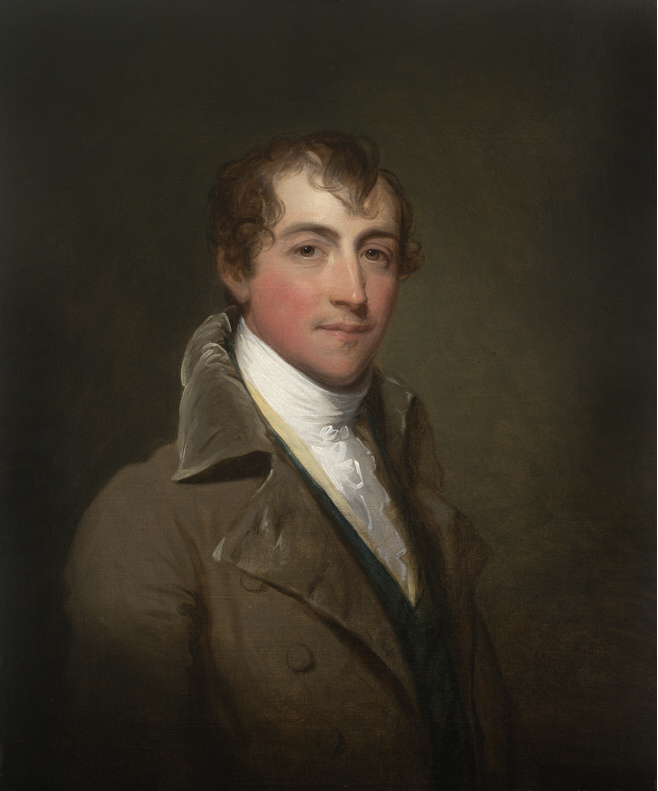
- Portrait of Schuyler, by Gilbert Stuart, 1807

Member of the U.S. House of Representatives from New York's 5th district
- In office March 4, 1817 – March 3, 1819
- Preceded by: Thomas P. Grosvenor
- Succeeded by: James Strong

Member of the New York State Assembly
- In office July 1, 1797 – June 30, 1799
- Constituency: Dutchess County (1797–98); Albany County (1798–99)

Personal details
- Born: January 21, 1768 Albany, Province of New York, British America
- Died: February 21, 1835 (aged 67) New York City, New York, U.S.
- Resting place: Poughkeepsie Rural Cemetery, Poughkeepsie, New York
- Party: Federalist
- Spouse(s): Sarah Rutsen; Mary Anna Sawyer
- Children: 5 (first wife); 3 (second wife)
- Parent(s): Philip Schuyler; Catherine Van Rensselaer
- Relatives: See Schuyler family
- Profession: Farm and estate owner and manager

Philip Jeremiah Schuyler (January 21, 1768 – February 21, 1835) was an American politician from New York. His siblings included Angelica Schuyler, Elizabeth Schuyler Hamilton, and Margarita Schuyler Van Rensselaer.

== Life ==
He was the son of Revolutionary War General Philip Schuyler (1733–1804) and Catherine Van Rensselaer (1734–1803). The Schuyler family were intermarried with other prominent New York families, including the Van Cortlandts and Livingstons, and his relatives included uncle Jeremiah Van Rensselaer. Alexander Hamilton, John Barker Church, and Stephen Van Rensselaer were all his brothers-in-law. He received his education through private tutors.

== Career ==
Schuyler came to Rhinebeck in 1796 and in 1800 erected a mansion he called "The Grove". From there he managed farms and estates throughout upstate New York which were owned by his and his wife's families. Schuyler served in the New York Militia and attained the rank of major before resigning in 1799. He returned to service with the War of 1812, during which he held the rank of colonel.

He was a member of the New York State Assembly, serving in the 21st New York State Legislature, representing Dutchess County, and in the 22nd New York State Legislature, representing Albany County. He was elected as a Federalist to the 15th United States Congress, holding office from March 4, 1817, to March 3, 1819.

== Personal life ==
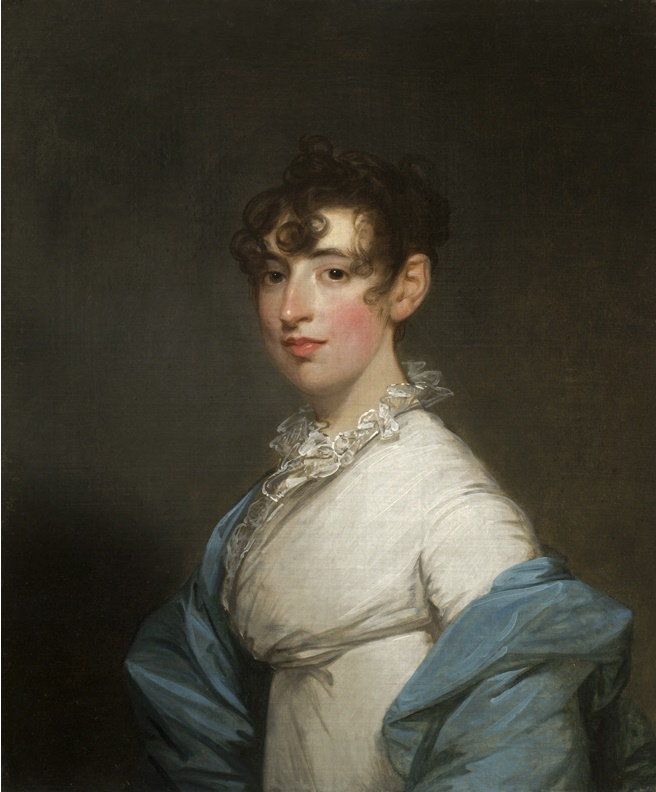
Portrait of Schuyler's second wife, Mary Anna Sawyer, by Gilbert Stuart, 1807.

Schuyler married Sarah Rutsen (1770–1803), daughter of John Rutsen (1743–1771) and a descendant of Wilhelmus Beekman, and inheritor of a large portion of the Beekman Patent, which encompassed much of what is now Dutchess County. Together, they had:

- Philip P. Schuyler (1789–1822), who married Rosanna Livingston
- Stephen Van Rensselaer Schuyler (1792–1859), who married Catherine Morris
- Catherine Schuyler (1793–1829), who married Samuel Jones (1770–1853)
- John Rutsen Schuyler (1796–1875)
- Robert Schuyler (1798–1855), who married Lucinda Wood (1807–1882), an 1817 graduate of Harvard and railroad speculator/embezzler.

After his first wife died, he married Mary Anna Sawyer (1786–1852) of Newburyport, Massachusetts. She was a daughter of Micajah Sawyer (1737–1817), a founding member of American Academy of Arts and Sciences and Sibyl Farnham (1747–1842). Together, they had:

- William Schuyler (1807–1829)
- Sybil Schuyler (1809–1813)
- George Lee Schuyler (1811–1890), who married Eliza Hamilton (1811–1863), daughter of James Hamilton. After her death, he married Eliza's sister, Mary Morris Hamilton (1815–1877)

He died of tuberculosis, and was buried at New York Marble Cemetery. His remains were later moved to the Poughkeepsie Rural Cemetery.

His home, an estate he called The Grove, was added to the National Register of Historic Places in 1987.

=== Descendants ===
Through his youngest son George, he was the grandfather of General Philip Schuyler (1836–1906). Schuyler was a prominent society figure who was featured in Ward McAllister's famous The Four Hundred.

U.S. House of Representatives
Preceded by Thomas P. Grosvenor	Member of the U.S. House of Representatives from New York's 5th congressional district 1817–1819	Succeeded by James Strong
