= William Porter Burrall =

American politician

Member of the Connecticut House of Representatives
- In office 1861–1862; 1846–1846; 1836–1836

Member of the Connecticut State Senate for the 10th District
- In office 1851–1851

Mayor of Bridgeport, Connecticut
- In office 1841–1842
- Preceded by: Charles Bostwick
- Succeeded by: James C. Loomis

Personal details
- Born: September 18, 1806 Canaan, Connecticut
- Died: March 3, 1874 (aged 67) Hartford, Connecticut
- Spouse: Harriet Holley (m. 1831)
- Children: 6
- Parent(s): William Morgan Burrall; Abigail Porter Stoddard
- Education: Yale College; Litchfield Law School
- Profession: Politician, lawyer

William Porter Burrall (September 18, 1806 – March 3, 1874) was an American politician and railroad executive.

== Early life ==
Burrall was born on September 18, 1806, in Canaan, Conn. to Hon. William Morgan Burrall (1779–1856) and Abigail Porter Stoddard (1783–1813), who had married November 4, 1803. His siblings were Elizabeth Burrall (b. 1804), who married Edmond S. Belden, Edward Burrall (1809-1814), and Abigail S. Burrall (1811–1813), who both died young.

His paternal grandparents were William Burrall (1748–1825) and Elizabeth Morgan (1755–1829), of the Morgan family, who married in October 1774.

His mother was the only child of his maternal grandparents, Maj. Luther Stoddard (1746–1804) and Abigail Porter (1763–1797), who married in 1781. His grandmother's father was Dr. Joshua Porter (1730–1825), a 1754 graduate of Yale, fought in the Revolutionary War as a colonel. He was at the head of his regiment in October 1777 when John Burgoyne surrendered his 6,000 men after the Battles of Saratoga. After the war, he was elected to various official positions for forty-eight consecutive years. His maternal grand-uncles included Augustus Porter (1769–1849), a member of the New York State Assembly, and Peter Buell Porter (1773–1844), the United States Secretary of War. After his grandmother's death, his grandfather married Mary Wheeler (1765–1853).

He graduated from Yale College in 1826.

== Career ==
In 1826, immediately upon graduation he began the study of the law with his father, who had served in the Connecticut House of Representatives and Connecticut State Senate. After one year, be entered the office of Hon. Samuel Church (afterwards Chief Justice of the Connecticut Supreme Court), in Salisbury, and subsequently attended a course of lectures at the Litchfield Law School, and was admitted to the bar of Litchfield County in April 1829.

He practiced law in his native town until October 1838, when he moved to Bridgeport, Conn., to undertake the Presidency of the Housatonic Railroad Company, then just organized. He held this office until 1852 or 1853, when he resigned in consequence of the pressure of other engagements. He was also connected with the N. Y. and N. H. Railroad during its construction and the earlier years of its operation, and at the same time, and later, with the Illinois Central Railroad, first as treasurer, and afterwards as president.

In 1862, he was chosen Vice-President of the Hartford and New Haven Railroad, and at the death of the President in 1868, succeeded to the vacant office, and finally became Vice-President of the New York, New Haven and Hartford Railroad, upon the consolidation of the companies. This position he retained with distinguished credit until his sudden death, from apoplexy, in Hartford, March 3, 1874.

=== Public office ===
Burrall served as the Mayor of Bridgeport from 1841 until at least 1842. He also served as a member of the Connecticut State Senate, representing the 10th District, in 1851 alongside Dwight Loomis.

After moving from Bridgeport to Salisbury, in 1859, he subsequently represented that town several times in the Connecticut General Assembly, where he had served as Clerk of the Connecticut House of Representatives under Speaker Chauncey Fitch Cleveland.

== Personal life ==
On May 9, 1831, he married his cousin, Harriet Holley (1808–1876), daughter of Sarah "Sally" Porter (1778–1816) and John M. Holley (1777–1836), of Salisbury, Connecticut. Harriet's maternal grandfather was his great-grandfather, Dr. Joshua Porter. They were the parents of six children:

- William Holley Burrall (1832–1891)
- John Milton Burrall (1834–1880), who married Mary H. Dickinson of Florida in 1872
- Elizabeth Maria Burrall (b. 1836)
- Sarah Bostwick Burrall (1838–1924), who married Henry Hill Anderson (d. 1896), and moved to New York.
- Harriet Holley Burrall (1840–1860), who died unmarried.
- Porter Stoddard Burrall (b. 1846), who married Anna E. Croome of Tallahassee, Florida

He died on March 3, 1874, in Hartford, Connecticut, and was survived by his wife and five of his six children.

=== Descendants ===
His grandson, through his daughter Sarah, was Henry Burrall Anderson (1863–1938), who attended St. Paul's School in New Hampshire, Yale University and Harvard Law School, and who became a prominent lawyer and partner at Anderson, Gesser, Ferris & Anderson.
