= Challenge grant =

Grant support

Challenge grants are funds disbursed by one party (the grant maker), usually a government agency, corporation, foundation or trust (sometimes anonymously), typically to a non-profit entity or educational institution (the grantee) upon completion of the challenge requirement(s). The challenge refers to the actions or results that must be achieved before money is released and usually involves substantial effort, so that the recipients know that they are helping themselves through their own hard work and sacrifice.

Challenge grants:

1. Spotlight the recipient organization and provide an endorsement from a well-known entity.
2. Help other donors feel that their money goes further.
3. Enable the recipient to honor and reward the entity that issued the challenge grant.
4. Provide the maker the opportunity to garner positive publicity with a notably large funding amount they may avoid parting with.

A typical requirement is similar to matching funds where funds must be raised or acquired from other sources following a stated matching factor, often 2:1, 3:1 or 4:1. For example, a $1,000 challenge grant with a 3:1 match would require the recipient to raise $3,000 before they would receive the $1,000 grant. The challenge could require a new solution to an existing problem that had been ignored. There could be additional requirements specified that could be virtually anything, from program certification to member participation.
