= George Rainsford Fairbanks =

American lawyer (1820–1906)

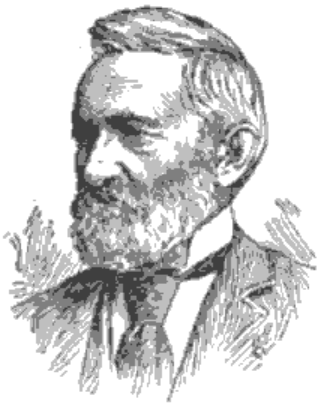
- Born: July 5, 1820; Watertown, New York
- Died: August 3, 1906 (aged 86); Sewanee, Tennessee
- Spouses: Sarah Catherine Wright (m. 1842; died 1858) Susan Beard (m. 1860)
- Children: 7

George Rainsford Fairbanks (1820–1906) was a lawyer, Clerk of the Circuit Court, Florida State Senator, president of Florida Fruit Growers Association and the Florida Fruit Exchange; editor of the Florida Mirror; the author of books on Florida history; and the founder and president of Florida Historical Society. He lived in Fernandina Beach. He is listed as a Great Floridian.

== Life and career ==
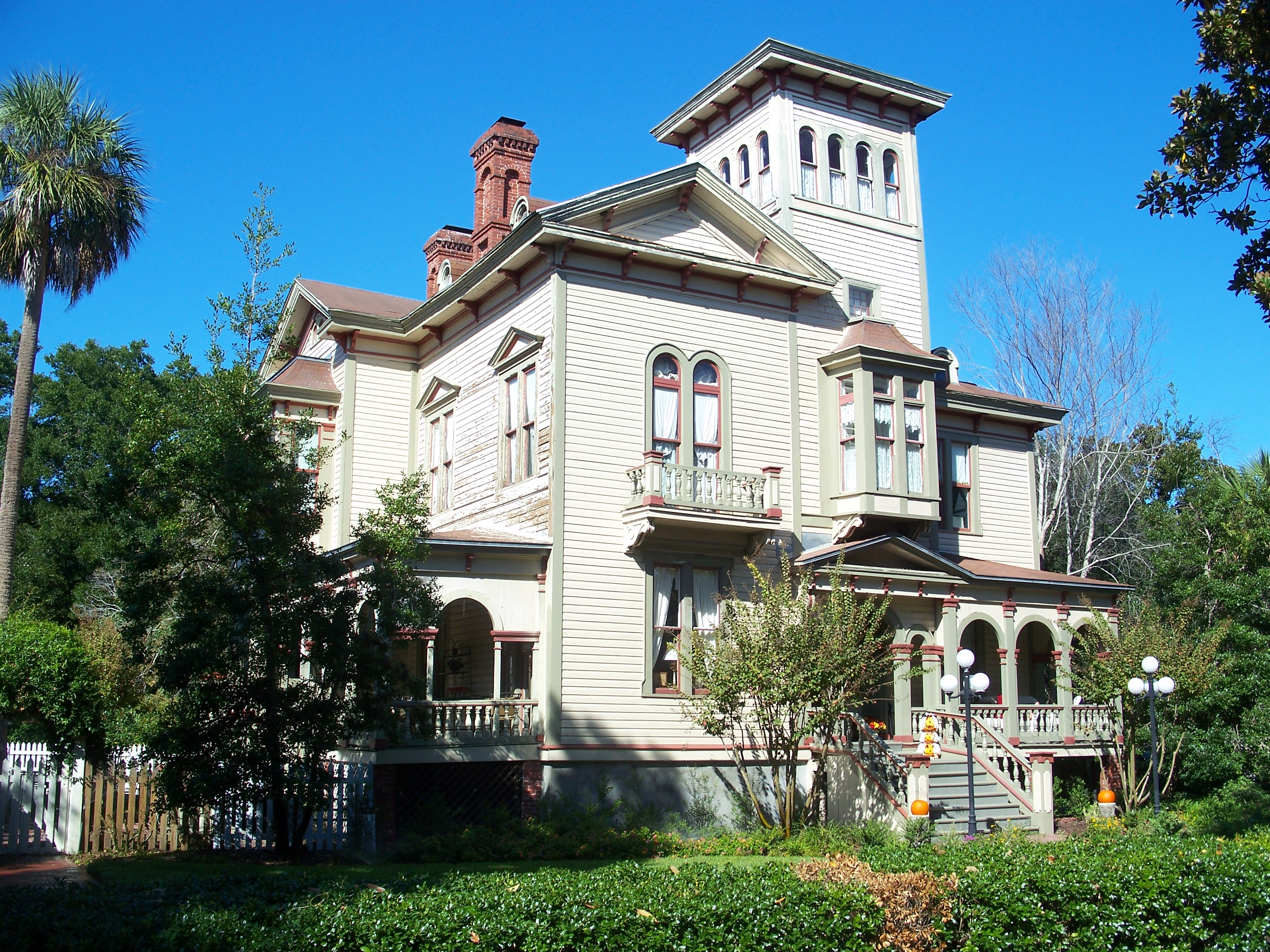
Fairbanks House on Fernandina Beach, Amelia Island

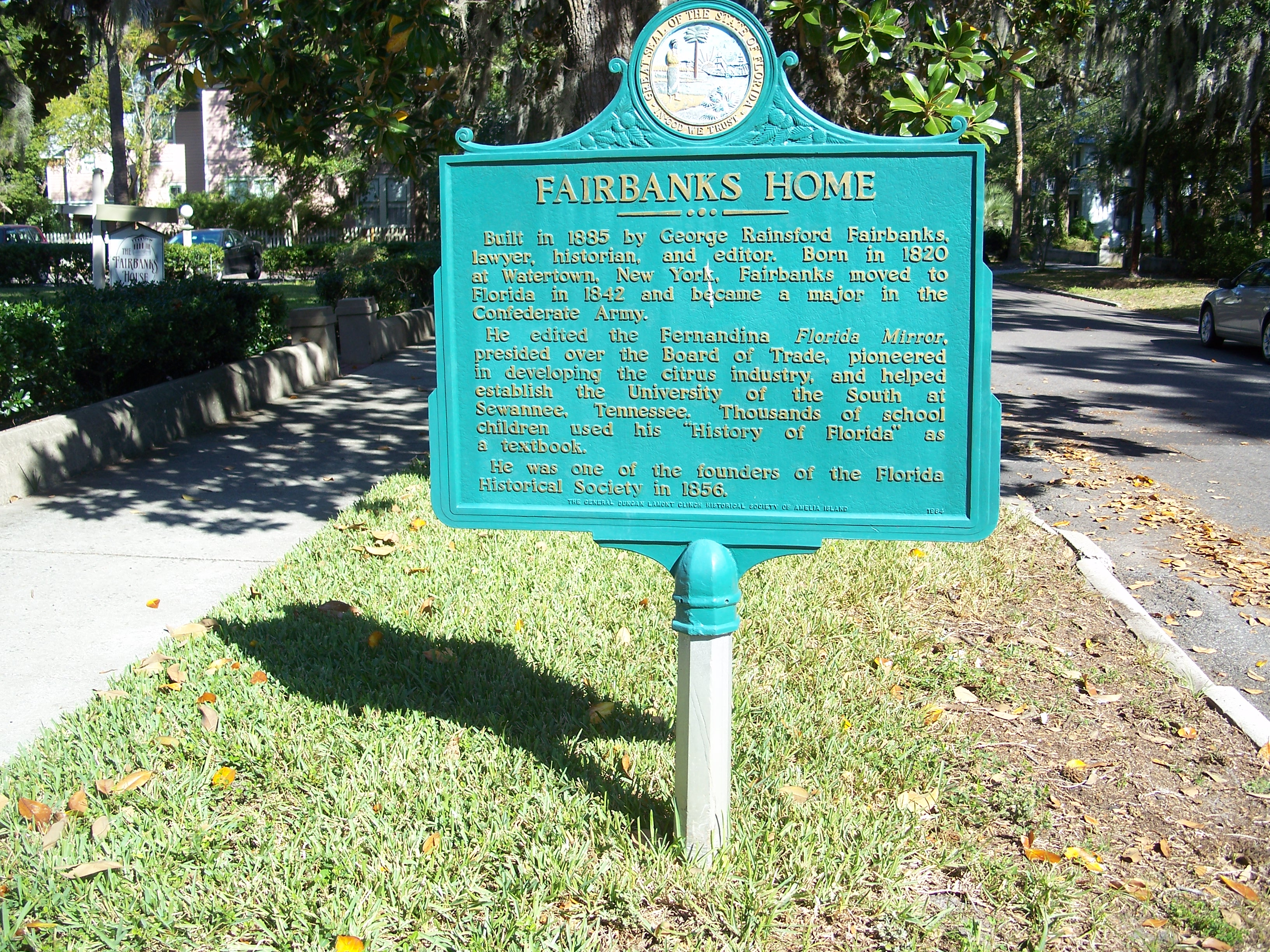
Historical marker at the Fairbanks House

George Rainsford Fairbanks was born in Watertown, New York on July 5, 1820. He married Sarah Catherine Wright on October 8, 1842. She died in 1858, and he remarried, to Susan Beard, on April 25, 1860.

Senator David Yulee brought Fairbanks, a Confederate Major during the U.S. Civil War, to Fernandina in 1879 to run the town's Florida Mirror newspaper. Fairbanks was also a historian, an educator, a former state senator, and one of the founders of the University of the South in Sewanee, Tennessee. He and his granddaughter witnessed the fire that destroyed downtown Jacksonville 40 miles away from the house he built in 1885.

He died at his home in Sewanee on August 3, 1906.

The Fairbanks House was converted into a bed & breakfast and is on Amelia Island's Fernandina Beach at 227 South Seventh Street. It was listed on the National Register of Historic Places in 1973.

== Bibliography ==
- History of the University of the South, at Sewanee, Tennessee: From its founding by the Southern Bishops, Clergy, and Laity of the Episcopal Church in 1857 to the year 1905
- Florida, its history and its romance: the oldest settlement in the United States, Associated with the Most Romantic Events of American History, Under the Spanish, French, English, and American Flags. 1497–1901 Richard Allen Martin H. and W. B. Drew Company 1901
- History of Florida from its discovery by Ponce de Leon, in 1512 to the close of the Florida War in 1842 Philadelphia: J. B. Lippincott & Co., 1871
- The Spaniards in Florida; Comprising the notable settlement of the Huguenots in 1564, and the History and Antiquities of St. Augustine Founded A.D. 1565 Columbus Drew, Jacksonville, Florida 1868
- The Early History of Florida; An Introductory Lecture 1857
- The Perils of the Republic: An Oration – 1856
- The History and Antiquities of St Augustine, Florida, Etc.
