= Jeremiah Van Rensselaer =

American politician (1738–1810)

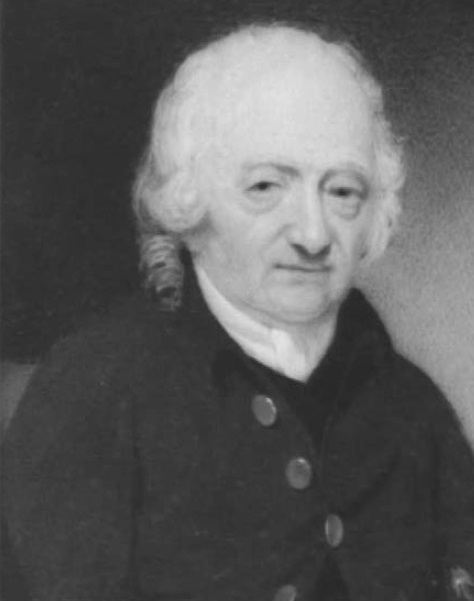
- Portrait believed to be Jeremiah Van Rensselaer, attributed to Richard Morrell Staigg

Lieutenant Governor of New York
- In office July 1, 1801 – June 30, 1804
- Governor: George Clinton
- Preceded by: Stephen Van Rensselaer
- Succeeded by: John Broome

Member of the U.S. House of Representatives from New York's 6th district
- In office March 4, 1789 – March 3, 1791
- Preceded by: New district
- Succeeded by: James Gordon

Personal details
- Born: August 27, 1738 Rensselaerswyck, Province of New York, British America
- Died: February 19, 1810 (aged 71) Albany, New York, U.S.
- Party: Anti-Administration; Democratic-Republican
- Spouses: Judith Bayard (m. 1760; died 1764); Helena Lansing (m. 1764; died 1795)
- Children: Johannes Jeremiah Van Rensselaer
- Parents: Johannes Van Rensselaer; Angelica Livingston

Jeremiah Van Rensselaer (August 27, 1738 – February 19, 1810), from the prominent Van Rensselaer family, was the lieutenant governor of New York and a member of Congress in the U.S. House of Representatives, representing New York in the 1st United States Congress.

== Early life ==
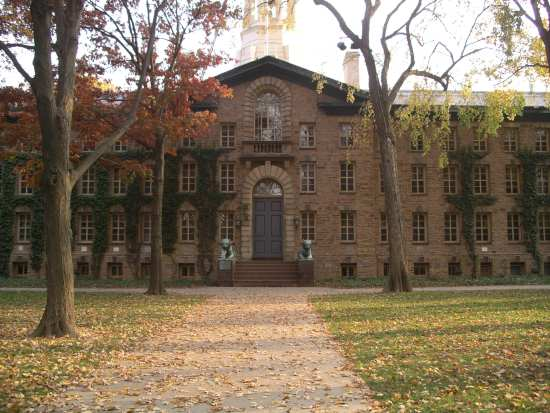
Nassau Hall, at Princeton University (then, the College of New Jersey)

Jeremiah Van Rensselaer was born on August 27, 1738, at the main home of his family's manor, "Rensselaerswyck" in the Province of New York, in what is now the city of Watervliet. His parents were Johannes Van Rensselaer (1708–1793) and Engeltie "Angelica" Livingston (1698–1747), who married in 1734. He was the third of six children: Catherine (b. 1734), Margarita (b. 1736), Jeremiah, Robert (b. 1740), Hendrick (b. 1742), and James (b. 1747). His mother died before he was 10 years-old and his father remarried, to Gertrude van Cortlandt.

His older sister was Catherine van Rensselaer (1734–1803) who in 1755 married Philip Schuyler (1733–1804), a Revolutionary general and United States Senator from New York. This relationship made him the maternal uncle to Angelica Schuyler (1756–1814), who married British MP John Barker Church, Elizabeth Schuyler (1757–1854), who married Alexander Hamilton, the first United States Secretary of the Treasury, Margarita Schuyler (1758–1801), who married Stephen Van Rensselaer III, the son of Jeremiah's first cousin, Stephen van Rensselaer II (1742–1769), and Philip Jeremiah Schuyler (1768–1835), who also served in the United States House of Representatives.

His younger brother was Robert Van Rensselaer (1740–1802), a Brigadier General during the Revolutionary War, a member of the New York Provincial Congress from 1775 to 1777 and later a member of the New York State Assembly in the 1st, 2nd and 4th New York State Legislatures. Robert's son and Jeremiah's nephew was Jacob Van Rensselaer (1767–1835), a Federalist member of the New York State Assembly and the Secretary of State of New York from 1813 to 1815.

=== Education ===
Van Rensselaer was tutored at the manor house, attended private school in Albany, New York, and attended college at the College of New Jersey (now Princeton University) where he graduated in 1758.

=== Family ===
Jeremiah was descended from and married into "the best provincial families" in New York including the Livingstons, Schuylers, Van Cortlandts, Van Schaicks, and Bayards.

His paternal grandfather was Hendrick van Rensselaer (1667–1740), director of the Eastern patent of the Rensselaerswyck manor, and his paternal grandmother was Catharina Van Brugh, daughter of merchant Johannes Pieterse Van Brugh (1624–1697). He had many noteworthy cousins, including Killian K. Van Rensselaer (1763–1845), who was also a U.S. Representative who served in Congress from 1803 until 1811.

His maternal grandparents were Robert Livingston Jr. (1663–1725) and Margarita Schuyler (b. 1682). His maternal great-grandparents were Pieter Schuyler (1657–1724), the first Mayor of Albany, and Engeltie Van Schaick (d. 1689).

== Career ==
Van Rensselaer became a land agent, merchant, and surveyor. According to the 1790 and 1800 U.S. censuses, his household included three slaves. In 1766, he was a signer of the constitution of the Albany Sons of Liberty and became a member of the Albany Committee of Safety. During the American Revolutionary War he was commissioned as an ensign in the third regiment of the New York Line where he served as a paymaster.

He was elected to the First United States Congress and served from March 4, 1789, to March 3, 1791, but lost his bid for reelection to the Second Congress to James Gordon. He later ran for the 7th congressional district in 1793, losing to Federalist nominee Henry Glen.

In 1789, he was member of the New York State Assembly. In 1791, he was a member of the first board of directors of the Bank of Albany, and from 1798 through 1806, served as president of the bank. He was a presidential elector in 1800, voting for Thomas Jefferson and Aaron Burr.

Van Rensselaer was Lieutenant Governor of New York from 1801 to 1804, serving under Governor George Clinton. He was curator of the Evangelical Lutheran Seminary at Albany in 1804.

== Personal life ==
On July 3, 1760, he married Judith Bayard, the great-granddaughter of Nicholas Bayard (1644–1707). Together, they had one son:

- Johannes "John" Jeremiah Van Rensselaer (1762–1828), who married Catharina Glen (1765–1807).

In February 1764, after his first wife's death of Yellow Fever, he married Helena "Lena" Lansing.

He died on February 19, 1810, in Albany and was buried in the Dutch Reformed cemetery there. His body was later moved to the Albany Rural Cemetery in Menands, New York.

=== Descendants ===
Although Van Rensselaer only had one son, he had many grandchildren, including:

- Catharina Glen Van Rensselaer (1785–1866), who married Nanning Visscher,
- John Jeremiah Van Rensselaer (b. 1790), who died young,
- Jeremias "Jeremiah" Van Rensselaer (1796–1871), a well known physician who was the first American to climb Mont Blanc, who first married Charlotte Foster and later Anne F. Waddington
- Glen Van Rensselaer (b. 1795)
- Elizabeth Bayard Van Rensselaer (b. 1797)
- Cornelius Glen Van Rensselaer (1801–1871), who married Catharine Westerlo Bleecker, daughter of John Bleecker and Elizabeth Van Rensselaer (the daughter of Stephen Van Rensselaer II)
- Archibald Van Rensselaer (b. 1803).

U.S. House of Representatives
New district	Member of the U.S. House of Representatives from New York's 6th congressional district 1789–1791	Succeeded by James Gordon
Political offices
Preceded by Stephen Van Rensselaer	Lieutenant Governor of New York; 1801–1804	Succeeded by John Broome
