= Robert Van Rensselaer =

American politician (1740–1802)

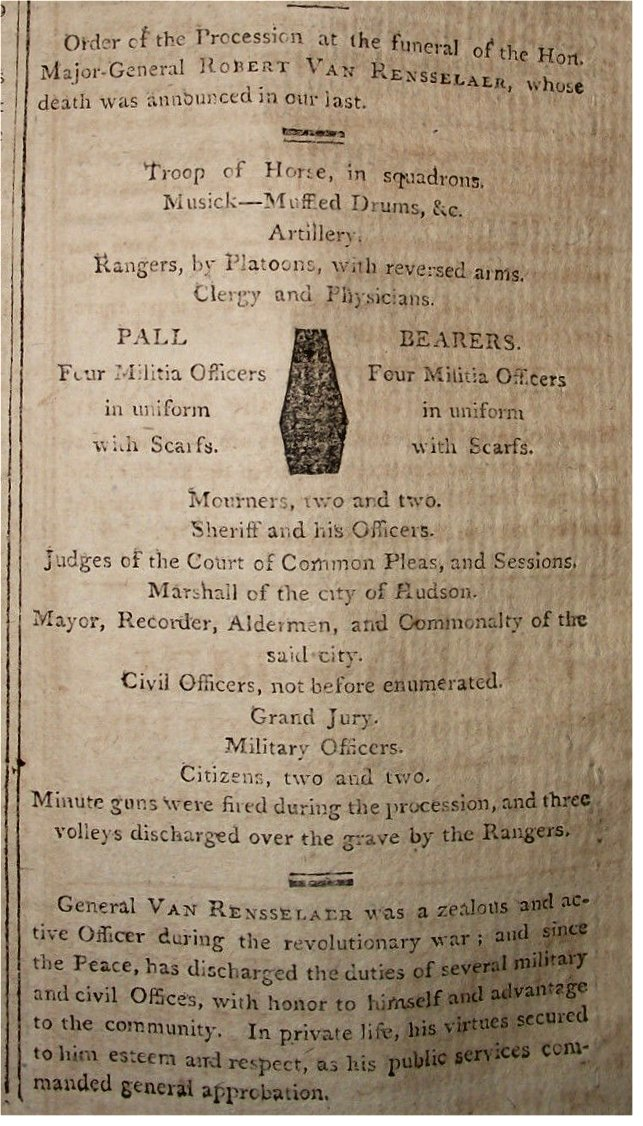
- Robert Van Rensselaer 1740-1802.jpg

Member of the New York State Assembly
- In office 1777-78, 1778-79 and 1780-81

Member of the New York Provincial Congress
- In office 1775–1777

Personal details
- Born: December 16, 1740 Fort Crailo, Rensselaer, New York, British America
- Died: September 11, 1802 (aged 61) Lower Manor House, Claverack, New York, U.S.
- Party: Federalist
- Spouse: Cornelia Rutsen (m. 1765; died 1790)
- Relations: See Van Rensselaer family
- Parent(s): Johannes Van Rensselaer; Engeltie Livingston

Military service
- Allegiance: United States
- Branch/service: New York Militia
- Rank: Brigadier General
- Unit: Albany County militia
- Battles/wars: American Revolutionary War; Siege of Fort Ticonderoga; Battle of Klock's Field

Robert Van Rensselaer (December 16, 1740 – September 11, 1802) was Brigadier General during the American Revolutionary War, a member of the New York Provincial Congress from 1775 to 1777 and later a member of the New York State Assembly in the 1st, 2nd and 4th New York State Legislatures.

== Early life ==
Robert Van Rensselaer was born December 16, 1740, at Fort Crailo in Rensselaer, Province of New York. He was the son of Johannes Van Rensselaer (1708–1793), and Engeltie "Angelica" Livingston (1698–1746/47), descendants of ethnic Dutch and English colonists. His older siblings were Jeremiah Van Rensselaer, who became the 3rd Lieutenant Governor of New York, and Catherine Van Rensselaer, who married Philip Schuyler. Schuyler, a Federalist, was elected as a United States senator from New York.

Van Rensselaer's paternal grandparents were Hendrick van Rensselaer (1667–1740), director of the Eastern patent of the Rensselaerswyck manor, and Catharina Van Brugh, daughter of merchant Johannes Pieterse Van Brugh (1624–1697). His paternal 2x great-grandfather was the merchant Killian Van Rensselaer, one of the original founders of the Dutch colony, New Amsterdam. His maternal grandparents were Robert Livingston the Younger and Margarita Schuyler, the daughter of Pieter Schuyler, the first Mayor of Albany.

== Career ==
On October 20, 1775, he was made colonel of the 8th Albany County Regiment of militia and on June 16, 1780, he was promoted to brigadier general of the second brigade of the Albany County militia. This brigade included the Tryon County militia. He fought at Fort Ticonderoga and at the Battle of Klock's Field.

From 1775 to 1777, he was a member of the New York Provincial Congress and a member of the New York State Assembly in 1777-78, 1778-79 and 1780-81. In 1780, Van Rensselaer negotiated a mediation with the chiefs of the Oneida Nation, Native Americans who had been allied with the American colonists against the British. One of their members had been found with a war wampum belt indicating alliance with the British against the colonists. Van Rensselaer was trying to discover if there was a spy in their midst. The Mohawk Nation, led by Joseph Brant in military action, was among the Iroquois nations allied with the British.

After the United States gained independence, Van Rensselaer was a Federalist presidential elector in 1796. He cast his votes for the eventual 2nd President of the United States, John Adams, and Thomas Pinckney. The latter lost the vice-presidency to Thomas Jefferson. The men's differences made governing more difficult. After this, candidates for president and vice-president were required to be elected together on a ticket from the same political party.

== Personal life ==
On April 23, 1765, Robert married Cornelia Rutsen (1747–1790), the daughter of Colonel Jacob Rutsen and Alida Livingston on April 23, 1765, and had the following children:

- John Van Rensselaer (b. 1766), who died with no heirs.
- Jacob Rutsen Van Rensselaer (1767–1835), who married Cornelia de Peyster (1774–1849), daughter of Pierre de Peyster.
- Jeremiah Van Rensselaer (1769–1827), who married Sybil Adeline Kane (1770–1828).
- Alida Van Rensselaer (c. 1771–1799), who married Elisha Kane (1770–1834) in 1794.
- Catharine Van Rensselaer (c. 1770–1867), who married Colonel John Arent Schuyler of Belleville, New Jersey.
- Angelica Van Rensselaer (c. 1785–1818), who married Reverend Thomas Yardley How.
- Henry Van Rensselaer (b. 1775), who married Catherine D. Hoffman.
- James Van Rensselaer (1783–1840), who moved to Jasper County, Indiana and purchased land to found Rensselaer, Indiana.

Van Rensselaer died September 11, 1802, at the Van Rensselaer Lower Manor House.

=== Descendants ===
Through his daughter Alida, he was the grandfather of John Kintzing Kane (1795–1858), a noted Pennsylvania lawyer and judge who served as the Attorney General of Pennsylvania. Kane was the father of Elisha Kent Kane (1820–1857), the explorer, Thomas Leiper Kane (1822–1883), an attorney and abolitionist, and Elizabeth Kane (1830–1869), who married Charles Woodruff Shields (1825–1904) in 1861.

== See also ==
- Van Rensselaer family
