= Johannes Van Rensselaer =

Member of prominent colonial family (1708–1783)

- Born: January 3, 1708; Rensselaerswyck, New York, British America
- Died: February 21, 1783 (aged 75)
- Spouses: Angelica Livingston (m. 1734; died 1747): Gertrude van Cortlandt
- Children: 6, including Catherine, Jeremiah, Robert
- Parent(s): Hendrick van Rensselaer; Catharina Van Brugh
- Relatives: Johannes Pieterse Van Brugh (grandfather); Jeremias van Rensselaer (grandfather)

Johannes Van Rensselaer (January 3, 1708 – February 21, 1783) was a member of the prominent colonial Van Rensselaer family.

== Early life ==
Van Rensselaer was born on January 3, 1708, at the family estate, "Rensselaerswyck", in what is now Watervliet, New York. He was the eldest surviving son of Hendrick van Rensselaer (1667–1740), director of the Eastern patent of the Rensselaerswyck manor, and Catharina Van Brugh (1665–1730), daughter of merchant Johannes Pieterse Van Brugh (1624–1697). He was descended from and married into "the best provincial families" in New York including the Livingstons, Schuylers, Van Cortlandts, Van Schaicks, and Bayards.

== Career ==
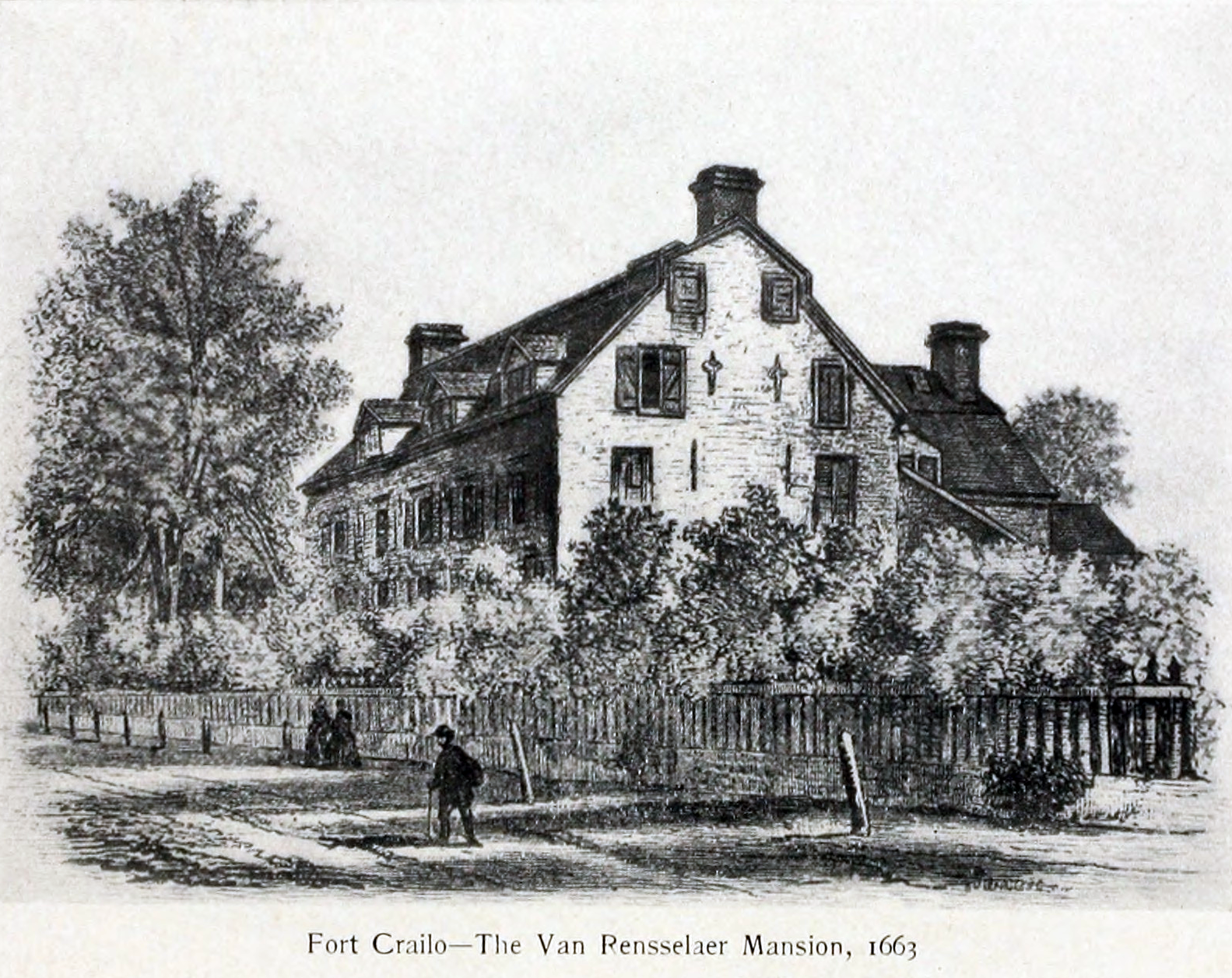
Fort Crailo in 1907

In 1740 upon the death of his father, he inherited Fort Crailo and became proprietor or Lord of the lower manor of Rensselaerswyck, known as "Claverack". Around 1762, he added a wing and remodeled the building. During the mid 1760s, his holdings in Greenbush were almost three times more valuable as any others in the entire east Manor. He also owned a house in the city of Albany tracts of land outside the manor.

During the later part of the 18th century, the Lower Manor was encroached on by New Englanders with Massachusetts titles to Van Rensselaer's lands. He fought a prolonged legal battle with the Massachusetts title owners in the courts, which reportedly "took its toll on the aging manor lord." During this time, he called on the Sheriff of Albany to evict the people, which eventually led to bloodshed. Throughout that time, he was a colonel in the Albany County militia.

== Personal life ==
In 1734, Van Rensselaer was married to Engeltie "Angelica" Livingston (1698–1747). She was the daughter of Robert Livingston the Younger (1663–1725) and Margarita Schuyler (b. 1682) and the granddaughter of Pieter Schuyler (1657–1724), the first Mayor of Albany. Together, they were the parents of six children:

- Catherine Van Rensselaer (1734–1803), who married Philip Schuyler (1733–1804), a Revolutionary general and United States Senator from New York, in 1755.
- Margarita Van Rensselaer (b. 1736)
- Jeremiah Van Rensselaer (1738–1810), who served in the First United States Congress from March 4, 1789, to March 3, 1791, was the Lieutenant Governor of New York from 1801 to 1804, and who married Judith Bayard, the great-granddaughter of Nicholas Bayard (1644–1707).
- Robert Van Rensselaer (1740–1802), who was a Brigadier General during the Revolutionary War, member of the New York Provincial Congress from 1775 to 1777 and member of the New York State Assembly in the 1st, 2nd and 4th New York State Legislatures.
- Hendrick Van Rensselaer (1742–1814), who married Rachel Douw (1744–1799), the daughter of Volkert P. Douw, the Mayor of Albany, New York.
- James Van Rensselaer (1747–1827), who married Elsie Schuyler (1759–1838)

After his wife's death, he married Gertrude van Cortlandt.

He died on February 21, 1783, and was buried in the Van Rensselaer Family Cemetery in East Greenbush, New York.

=== Descendants ===
Through his daughter Catherine, he was the grandfather of Angelica Schuyler (1756-1814), who married British MP John Barker Church, Elizabeth Schuyler (1757-1854), who married Alexander Hamilton, the first United States Secretary of the Treasury, Margarita Schuyler (1758-1801), who married Stephen Van Rensselaer III, the son of Jeremiah's first cousin, Stephen van Rensselaer II (1742–1769), and Philip Jeremiah Schuyler (1768-1835), who served in the United States House of Representatives.

Through his son Jeremiah, he was the grandfather of Johannes "John" Jeremiah Van Rensselaer (1762–1828), who married Catharina Glen (1765–1807).

Through his son Robert, he was the grandfather of Jacob Van Rensselaer (1767–1835), a Federalist member of the New York State Assembly and the Secretary of State of New York from 1813 to 1815.
