= Julesburg =

Julesburg may refer to:

- Julesburg, Colorado, United States
- Julesburg, Missouri, United States
- Julesburg, Limpopo, South Africa
