= William P. Hall House =

Historic house in Missouri, United States

- U.S. National Register of Historic Places
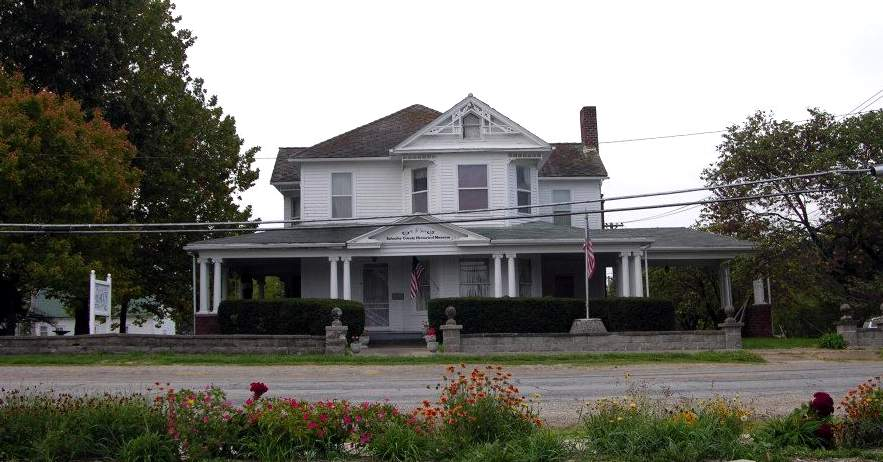
- William P. Hall House, September 2012

- Location within Missouri Location within the United States
- Location: U.S. 136, W of Schuyler County Courthouse, Lancaster, Missouri
- Coordinates: 40°31′25″N 92°31′45″W
- Area: 9.9 acres (4.0 ha)
- Built: 1902
- Architectural style: Late Victorian
- NRHP reference No.: 75001073
- Added to NRHP: April 1, 1975

William P. Hall House is a historic home located at Lancaster, Schuyler County, Missouri, United States. It was built about 1902, and is a large two-story, irregular plan, Late Victorian style frame dwelling. It features a one-story wraparound porch with Ionic order columns and a porte cochere. It was the home of American showman, businessman, and circus impresario William Preston Hall (1864–1932).

It was added to the National Register of Historic Places in 1975.
