= Isabel Richey =

American poet

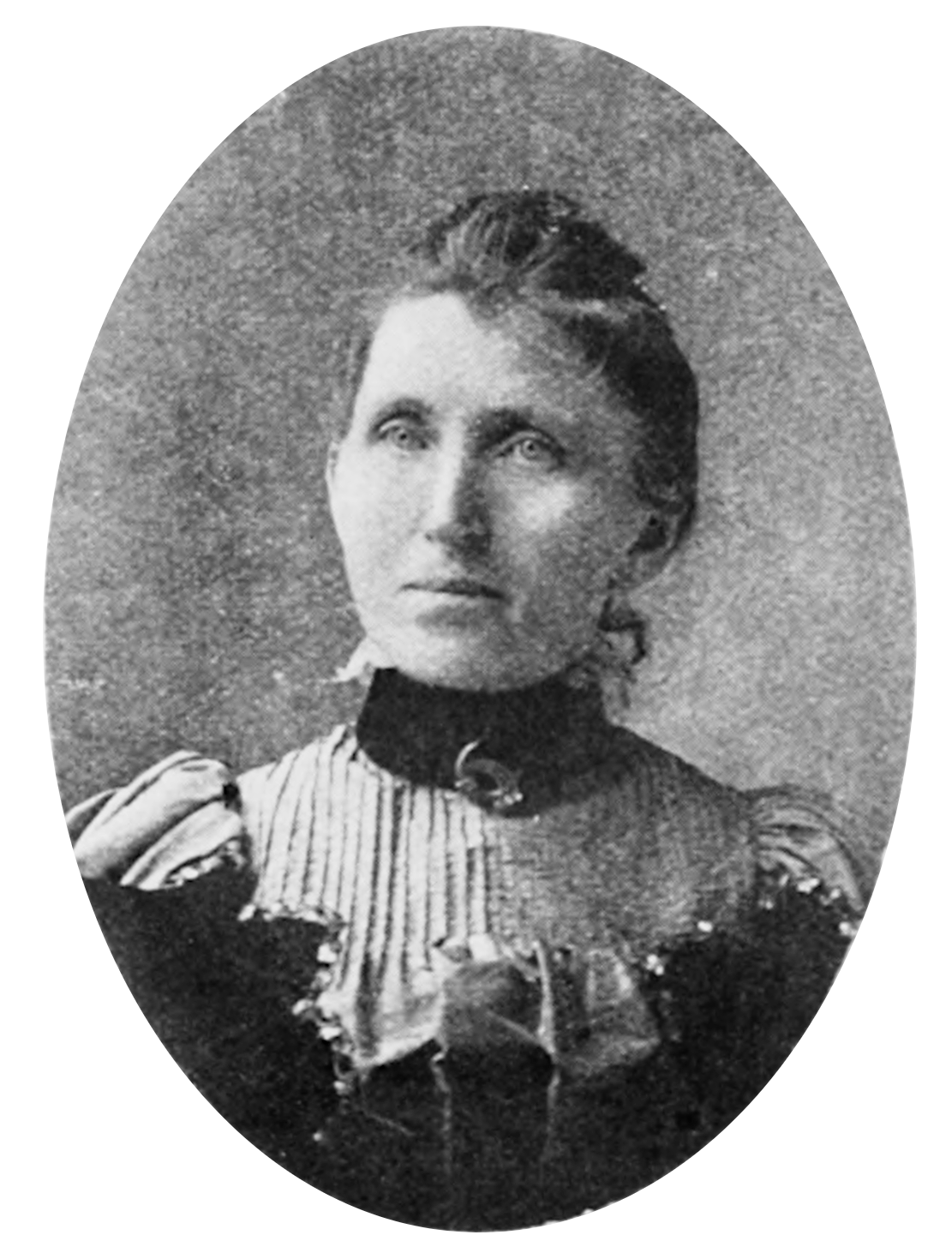
- author photograph from When Love Is King (1900)
- Born: Isabel Grimes; June 16, 1858; Lancaster, Missouri, U.S.
- Died: November 13, 1910 (aged 52); Plattsmouth, Nebraska, U.S.
- Occupation: poet
- Spouse: Justus G. Richey

Isabel Richey (née, Grimes; June 16, 1858 – November 13, 1910) was an American poet of the long nineteenth century. While her work appeared in various periodicals, only a small portion of her poetry was offered for publication. Richey was "perhaps the first woman in Nebraska to publish books of poetry".

== Early life and education ==
Isabel Grimes was born in Lancaster, Schuyler County, Missouri, June 16, 1858. (Note: Isabel's gravestone also records the June 16, 1858 birth date. According to Greasley (2016), Isabel was born in 1863. According to Familysearch.org, Isabel was born June 16, 1856.) Her father, Henry Clay Grimes (1832-1903), was a Kentuckian and her mother, Mary Frances (Tipton) Grimes (1836-1909), was of the Tipton family of Virginia.

Owing to disturbances caused by the American Civil War her father, who was a merchant, removed his family to Ottumwa, Iowa, when Richey was three years old. In her new home, the child began her education and was a quick and earnest pupil, always winning the good will of her instructors. A year before the time for graduation, her parents moved to the town of Afton, Iowa. Here, she finished in the high school.

== Career ==
For two years after graduation, she taught in the home schools.

After marrying Justus G. Richey on December 24, 1878, in Afton, Iowa, they resided in Plattsmouth, Nebraska. It was through the grief that followed the death of her first child, a son, Welch Richey (1880-1885), that Richey became aware of her skill in poetry. In 1888, she had another son, Justus Livingston Richey (1888-1957).

The first sign of her poetical ability exhibited itself in fugitive verse, but she only wrote when in the mood to do so, and only a small portion of her work was offered for publication. Her first work was published in Omaha, Nebraska papers, writing for the press starting in 1892. From 1893, Richey published two volumes of verse. In 1895, she published through the press of Charles Wells Moulton, of Buffalo, New York, A Harp of the West, which volume of poems received flattering notices at the hands of William Dean Howells, Joaquin Miller, Prof. Herbert Bates, "Ironquill" (Eugene Fitch Ware), James Whitcomb Riley, and other authors and critics of the day. She provided the lyrics for 'The Wood Nymph's Song', set to music by W. W. Abbott and published in 1896.

Richey's poems were generally serious, reflective, womanly; at times, they were tinged with a faint suspicion of weariness and sadness. She sought no startling effect or vivid denouements. Her versification was smooth; she never forced rhymes and accents. Her poems appeared in Everywhere, the Omaha Bee, the Omaha World-Herald, Woman's Tribune (Washington), the Magazine of Poetry, the Nebraska State Journal, the Woman's Weekly, and other periodicals.

Isabel Richey died at Plattsmouth, November 13, 1910.

== Selected works ==
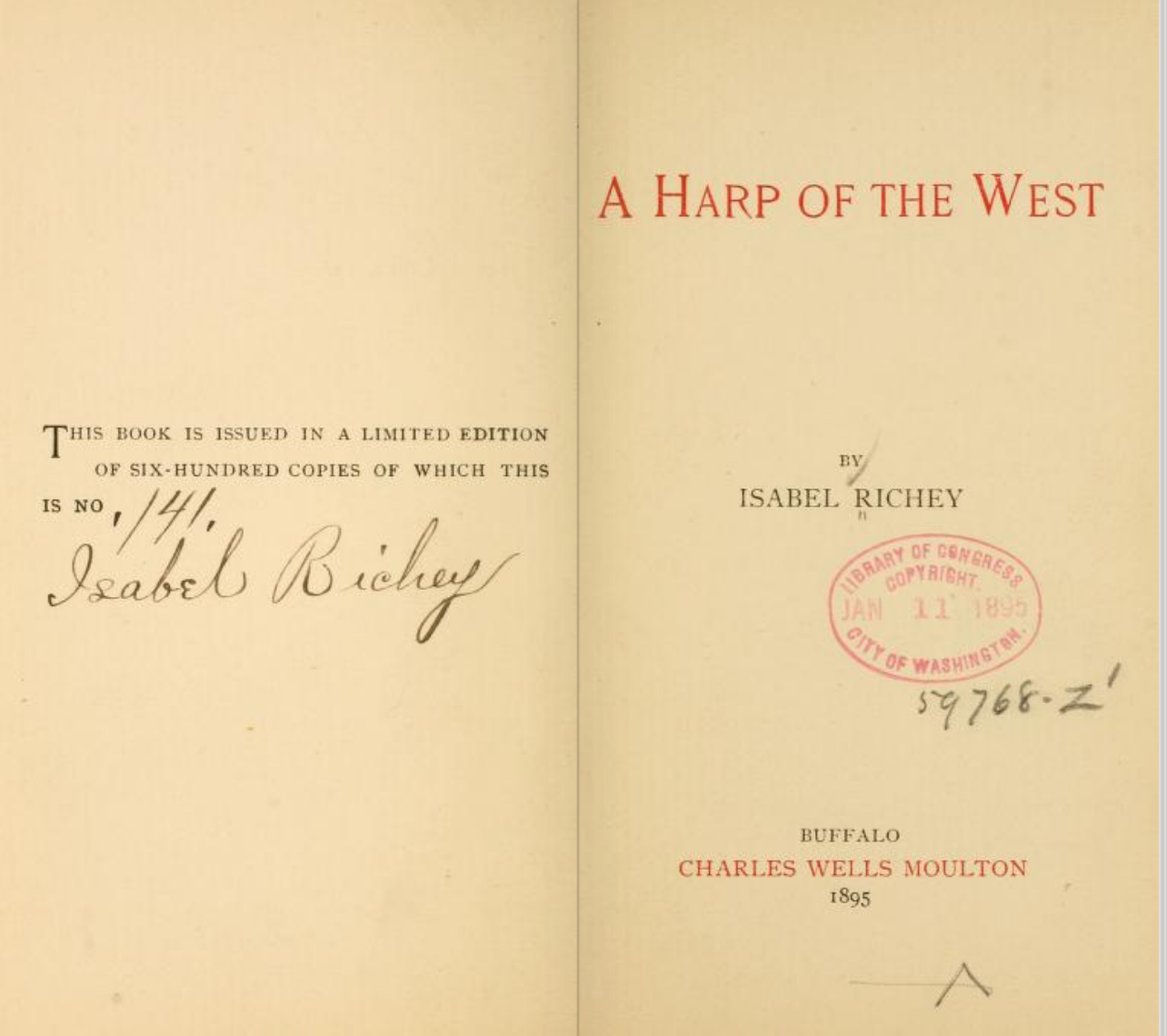
Title page of A Harp of the West, numbered and signed by the author

- Harp of the west, 1895
- When love is king, 1900
