= Robert Livingston the Younger =

American mayor

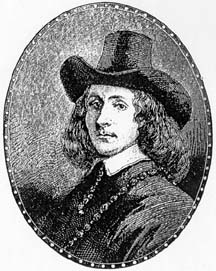

14th Mayor of Albany, New York
- In office 1710–1719
- Preceded by: Johannes Abeel
- Succeeded by: Myndert Schuyler

Personal details
- Born: 1663 Edinburgh, Scotland
- Died: April 1725 (aged 61/62) Albany, New York
- Citizenship: Great Britain
- Spouse: Margarita Schuyler (m. 1697)
- Children: 6
- Relatives: James Livingston (grandson); Catherine Van Rensselaer (granddaughter); Jeremiah Van Rensselaer (grandson); Robert Van Rensselaer (grandson); Henry van Rensselaer
- Nickname(s): Robert Livingston, Jr.

Robert Livingston the Younger (1663 – April 1725), sometimes known as Robert Livingston Jr., or The Nephew was a wealthy merchant and political figure in colonial Albany, New York.

== Early life ==
Livingston was born in 1663 in Edinburgh, Scotland. He was the son of James Livingston (1646–1673) and nephew of Robert Livingston the Elder. Once established in Albany, his uncle wrote to his father in Edinburgh, advising him to send his son Robert. Robert the Younger emigrated to North America, by way of London, in November 1687. He settled in Albany, where he managed his uncle's Albany enterprises.

== Career ==
After arriving in North America in 1687, Livingston's first job involved assisting his uncle as city and County Clerk. In 1699, he was appointed Deputy Secretary and Deputy Clerk, positions he held until 1707, when his cousin Philip Livingston became of age. In 1708, Livingston was elected Alderman for the First Ward. In 1709, he was appointed Recorder (or Deputy Mayor) of the City. At the same time, he was able to prosper in business, using family connections and experience to supply both settler and military customers.

In 1710, Livingston was appointed mayor of Albany, succeeding Johannes Abeel and serving in that role until 1719 when he was succeeded by Myndert Schuyler. During his tenure, Albany grew from a trading post to the area's major supply and services center. Livingston was also appointed as one of the English colony's Commissioners for Indian Affairs.

== Personal life ==
In 1697, Livingston married Margareta (or Margarita) Schuyler (b. 1682), the daughter of Pieter Schuyler (1657–1724), the first mayor of Albany, and Engeltie Van Schaick (d. 1689). Their children "married into the best provincial families and enjoyed great success in the business of New York, Montreal, and the lands in between. Together, they had six children:

- Engeltje "Angelica" Livingston (1698–1747), who married Johannes Van Rensselaer (1708–1793), son of Hendrick van Rensselaer (1667–1740).
- Jacobus "James" Livingston (1701–1763), who married Maria Kierstede (1704–1762)
- Janet Livingston (1703–1724), who married Col. Henry Beekman of Rhinebeck, New York
- Pieter "Peter" Livingston (b. 1706), fur trader, killed by Seneca Indians near Geneva, New York
- Johannes "John" Livingston (1709–1791), who married Catharine Ten Broeck (1715–1802), the sister of Abraham Ten Broeck.
- Thomas Livingston, who died young.

In April 1725, Robert Livingston the Younger died and was buried in the Dutch church at Albany. Margarita survived her husband by many years; her death date is unknown but occurred between 1756 and 1784.

=== Descendants ===
Through his eldest daughter Angelica, he was the grandfather of:

- Catherine Van Rensselaer (1734–1803), who married Gen. Philip Schuyler (1733–1804) in 1755
- Jeremiah Van Rensselaer (1738–1810)
- Robert Van Rensselaer (1740–1802)
- Henry Van Rensselaer (ca 1742–1813)
- James Van Rensselaer (1747–1827), a Captain and aide de camp of Maj. Gen. Montgomery who fought in the Canadian campaign of Fort Chambly in Quebec and was Captain in the 2nd New York Regiment under Colonel James Clinton and later aide de camp of General Philip Schuyler.

Through his son James, his granddaughter was Margaret Livingston (1738–1809) who married Peter Robert Livingston (1737–1793), the son of Robert Livingston (grandson of Robert Livingston the Elder). Margaret's brother, Robert James Livingston (1725–1771), was the father of his Robert Livingston the Younger's great-grandson, Maturin Livingston (1769–1847).

Through his son John, he was the grandfather of:

- Margaret Livingston Chinn (1742–1820)
- James Livingston (1747–1832)
- Anne Livingston Jordan (1749–1788)
- Jennet Livingston Vanderheyden (1751–1825)
- Abraham Livingston (1753–1802)
- Catherine Livingston Willard (1755–1827)
- Maria J. Livingston (1759–1839).

Through his granddaughter, Catherine Schuyler, he is the ancestor of the entire Hamilton family, minus Alexander Hamilton, all descendants of General Philip J. Schuyler, several members of the Morgan family (through his daughter Juliet Pierpont Morgan Hamilton), the socialite Helen Morgan Hamilton, and several more relatives of heavily influential families of America.

== See also ==
- Livingston family
- History of Albany, New York

Political offices
Preceded by Johannes Abeel	Mayor of Albany, New York; 1710–1719	Succeeded by Myndert Schuyler
