= William Preston Hall =

American circus owner (1864–1932)

- Born: William Preston Hall; February 29, 1864; Schuyler County, Missouri
- Died: June 29, 1932 (aged 68); Lancaster, Schuyler County, Missouri
- Resting place: I.O.O.F. Cemetery; Lancaster, Missouri
- Other names: "Diamond Billy" "Horse King of the World" "The Colonel"
- Education: No formal education.
- Occupations: Animal broker, circus empresario & equipment broker.
- Spouse: Sarah (Mitchell) Hall
- Children: Son: William P. Hall, Jr. Daughters: Sidney, Wilma

William Preston Hall (1864–1932) aka "The Colonel", "Diamond Billy", and "Horse King of the World" was an American showman, businessman, and circus impresario. The William P. Hall House in Lancaster, Missouri, is listed on the National Register of Historic Places.

== Personal life ==
William Hall was born February 29, 1864, near Lancaster, Schuyler County, Missouri, to William and Sidney (Spurgeon) Hall. His mother died when he was 13, and his father when he was 15. In 1880 at 16 he was working for George Beeler as a farmhand. His parents are buried at Fabius Cemetery in Schuyler County, Missouri.The Horse King of the World by Bobby Poston. The Chariton Collector, Spring 1982.</ref> Hall bought his first horse at age 15, and by age 18 he was making a living as a full-time buyer and seller of horses. In 1894 he wed Sarah Mitchell. They had three children, one son William P. Hall Jr. and daughters Sidney and Wilma.

== Career ==
Horse King of the World: In his mid-twenties William Hall began to expand his horse and mule trading beyond northeast Missouri, selling thousands of animals to the likes of the American Express Company and the U.S. Army. Among his claims to fame are helping to establish the Missouri mule as one of the strongest and most reliable in the world. In 1895, Hall established an east coast operation with a sales facility in Richmond, Virginia, run by his brother, Louis. From that location the Halls shipped many mules and horses to the European markets, London, England and Hamburg, Germany most notably. It was on sales trips to Europe he developed an interest in circuses, which would come to play heavily in his later business life. The sale and overseas transfer of so many animals earn Hall his first nickname "Horse King of the World".

Diamond Billy: With the coming of the Boer War in 1899 came opportunity, one which Hall seized by establishing a sale barn in Cape Town, South Africa and selling many horses to the British army. Now an extremely wealthy man, William Hall purchased a large home and 160 acres (0.65 km^{2}) in his hometown of Lancaster. Always a lover of fine clothing and gems, Hall became known as "Diamond Billy" for the large amount of the precious stones he would wear. In fact, when supplying mules to the mines of South Africa, he would sometimes take raw diamonds as payment in lieu of cash. It was said that with some of his earliest wealth, he purchased 20,000 dollars worth' of diamonds to adorn his clothing. Organizers of the 1904 World's Fair in St. Louis, Missouri, asked William Hall to provide horses for a reenactment of Boer War battles. At the close of the fair he purchased several elephants and two camels. Having been fascinated with circuses since his earlier European trips, in 1904, Hall also purchased two small failing circus companies and combined them to form the W.P. Hall Circus. However he found the road life too arduous and unprofitable, thus disbanded the operation in 1905 after one season. It was the selling-off of the animals and equipment that sparked the next career phase, that as a supplier of equipment and animals to zoos and circuses.

Some of Hall's many elephants, 1915

The Colonel: The Colonel, as he was known to friends (Colonel being an honorary title bestowed on auctioneers), filled his farm with dozens of animals of all kinds bought up at discount prices from failing or defunct circuses all over the US. It was said a child in Schuyler County didn't have to run away to join the circus, because the circus had run away to them. Camels, lions, bears, and especially elephants were housed in giant barns and paddocks, while surplus circus wagons and other equipment dotted the landscape awaiting resale. Between 1905 and 1915, Colonel Hall was one of the largest importers of elephants from India and at times as many as thirty could be found on the Lancaster property. With the outbreak of World War I in 1914, his old business associates the British army again came calling. A substantial percentage, perhaps as high as seventy, of the British and Canadian armies' horses and mules came from Colonel Hall's animal brokering. On the home front, Hall figured out that sometimes selling animals and equipment wasn't always the best option. He established a leasing and rental business that proved highly profitable. Often, when a startup circus would go bankrupt, Hall would get not only his leased items and animals back, but the rest of the failed business's assets as payment, which he in turn could lease out again for still more profit. Big or small, a huge number of American circuses, including major names like Ringling Brothers and Cole, had dealings with Hall.

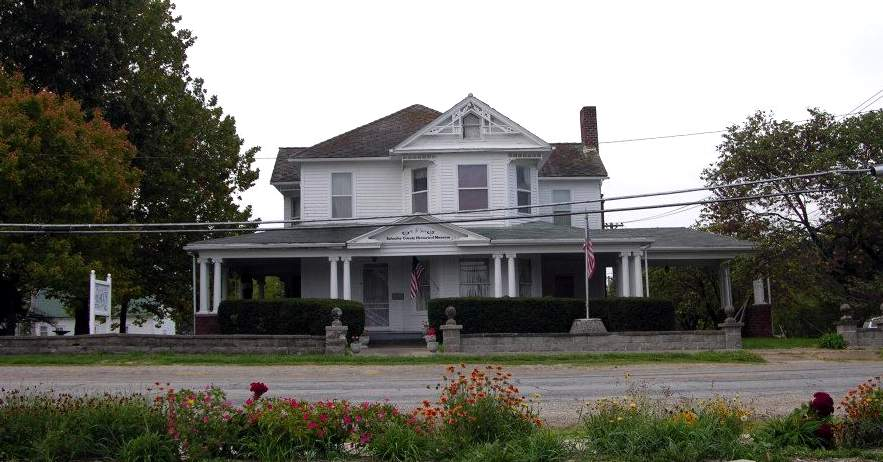
Hall's home in Lancaster, Mo. It now serves as a museum on Hall's life and houses the Schuyler County Historical Society.

Diamonds to dust: Even prior to the October 1929 Wall Street crash, the American circus business had begun to suffer, thus so did William Hall's revenues. The Great Depression severely curtailed all traveling shows, while the international demand for horses and mules was steadily in decline with the advent of motorized tractors and the automobile. Facing huge debts, William Hall offered all his remaining equipment and animals for sale in a May 1932 advertisement in Billboard Magazine. The next month, on June 29, 1932, The Colonel died from cancer at his home at the age of 68, although friends and family said the true cause was a broken heart. It was left to his son and business associates to pay off the remaining debt, and by the late 1940s the barns, paddocks, remaining equipment and animals were all either torn down or sold off. Two remnants of "The Horse King of the World" are still to be found in Lancaster. Cement pads with large rings still remain, waiting in vain for the day elephants will be chained to them. Also, the Hall home was sold to the Schuyler County Historical Society in the 1970s for use as a museum. It has since been placed on the National Register of Historic Places.
