= USS Schuyler =

Cargo ship of the United States Navy

History

United States
- Name: Schuyler
- Namesake: Schuyler County, Illinois, Schuyler County, Missouri, and; Schuyler County, New York
- Ordered: as type (C1-M-AV1) hull, MC hull 2163
- Builder: Leathem D. Smith Shipbuilding Company, Sturgeon Bay, Wisconsin
- Yard number: 329
- Laid down: 27 May 1944
- Launched: 26 October 1944
- Sponsored by: Miss Marilyn Hughes
- Acquired: 20 June 1945
- Commissioned: 13 July 1945
- Decommissioned: 27 March 1946
- Stricken: 5 June 1946
- Identification: Hull symbol: AK-209; Code letters: NXNV
- Fate: Sold to Zidell Corp. for scrapping, 5 February 1971

General characteristics
- Class & type: Alamosa-class cargo ship
- Type: C1-M-AV1
- Tonnage: 5,032 long tons deadweight (DWT)
- Displacement: 2,382 long tons (2,420 t) (standard); 7,450 long tons (7,570 t) (full load)
- Length: 388 ft 8 in (118.47 m)
- Beam: 50 ft (15 m)
- Draft: 21 ft 1 in (6.43 m)
- Installed power: 1 × Nordberg, TSM 6 diesel engine; 1,750 shp (1,300 kW)
- Propulsion: 1 × propeller
- Speed: 11.5 kn (21.3 km/h; 13.2 mph)
- Capacity: 3,945 t (3,883 long tons) DWT; 9,830 cu ft (278 m^{3}) (refrigerated); 227,730 cu ft (6,449 m^{3}) (non-refrigerated)
- Complement: 15 Officers; 70 Enlisted
- Armament: 1 × 3 in (76 mm)/50 caliber dual purpose gun (DP); 6 × 20 mm (0.8 in) Oerlikon anti-aircraft (AA) cannons

USS Schuyler (AK-209) was an Alamosa-class cargo ship that was constructed for the US Navy during the closing period of World War II. She served with distinction in the Pacific Ocean theatre of operations and returned home in 1946 to be placed into the reserve "mothball" fleet where she silently remained until she was scrapped in 1971.

== Construction ==
Schuyler was laid down under US Maritime Commission (MARCOM) contract, MC hull 2163, on 27 May 1944, by Leathem D. Smith Shipbuilding Company, Sturgeon Bay, Wisconsin; sponsored by Miss Marilyn Hughes; acquired by the Navy on 20 June 1945; and commissioned on 13 July 1945, at Galveston, Texas.

== Service history ==
=== World War II service ===
Schuyler loaded cargo at Gulfport, Mississippi, and Mobile, Alabama, and sailed from the latter port on 9 August 1945 for the Pacific Ocean. She arrived at Leyte on 28 September; but, due to the end of the war, neither the cargo nor the ship was required there. She remained in the Philippine Islands until the cargo was purchased by the United Nations Relief and Rehabilitation Administration for distribution in China.

The ship then proceeded to Shanghai and discharged her cargo there between 18 January and 22 March. She arrived at Yokosuka on 27 March, was decommissioned and simultaneously returned to the War Shipping Administration (WSA) on 22 April 1946, and struck from the Navy List on 5 June 1946.

=== Post-war inactivation ===
After service under charter to the Japanese government, the ship was laid up on 10 December 1954 in the National Defense Reserve Fleet at Olympia, Washington, where she remained until sold on 5 February 1971, for $34,385 and scrapping.

== Notes ==
Citations

== Bibliography ==
Online resources

- "Schuyler". Dictionary of American Naval Fighting Ships. Naval History and Heritage Command. 8 September 2015. This article incorporates text from this source, which is in the public domain.
- "C1 Cargo Ships". www.ShipbuildingHistory.com. 28 August 2009.
- "Schuyler (AK-209)". NavSource. 18 April 2014.
- "Schuyler". United States Department of Transportation. Archived from the original on July 8, 2015.
