= Clifton, Schuyler County, Missouri =

Unincorporated community in Missouri, U.S.

Clifton
- Unincorporated Community
- Interactive map of Clifton
- Coordinates: 40°25′38″N 92°29′04″W
- Country: United States
- State: Missouri
- County: Schuyler
- Elevation: 961 ft (293 m)
- Time zone: UTC−06:00 (Central)
  - Summer (DST): UTC−05:00 (CDT)
- ZIP Code: 63561
- GNIS feature ID: 733605

Clifton is an unincorporated community in Schuyler County, in the U.S. state of Missouri.

== History ==
A post office called Clifton was established in 1865, and remained in operation until 1904. The community most likely has the name of a local family.

A nearby community was "Germania".
