= Julesburg, Missouri =

Unincorporated community in Missouri, U.S.

- Unincorporated Community
- Interactive map of Julesburg, Missouri
- Coordinates: 40°27′42″N 92°36′22″W
- Country: United States
- State: Missouri
- County: Schuyler
- Elevation: 298 m (978 ft)
- Time zone: UTC−06:00 (Central)
  - Summer (DST): UTC−05:00 (CDT)
- ZIP Code: 63561

Julesburg is an unincorporated community in west central Schuyler County, in the U.S. state of Missouri. It lies two miles west of US-63 and two miles south of US Route 136. Lancaster lies approximately three miles to the northeast.

== History ==
Julesburg originally served as a post office to the surrounding rural area. The Julesburg post office was established in 1883, and remained in operation until 1906.
