= Julesburg, South Africa =

Julesburg
- Location within Limpopo Location within South Africa
- Coordinates: 24.099°S 30.330°E
- Country: South Africa
- Province: Limpopo
- District: Mopani
- Municipality: Greater Tzaneen

Area
  - Total: 3.28 km^{2} (1.27 sq mi)

Population (2001)
  - Total: 1,704
  - Density: 520/km^{2} (1,350/sq mi)

Racial makeup (2001)
  - Black African: 100%

First languages (2001)
  - Tsonga: 75.5%
  - Northern Sotho: 18.3%
  - Sotho: 6.0%
  - Tswana: 0.2%
- Time zone: UTC+2 (SAST)
- PO box: 0895

Julesburg is a village in Mopani District Municipality in the Limpopo province of South Africa. Julesburg is a rural area outside Tzaneen, which falls under Greater Tzaneen Municipality (GTM) ward 26, Julesburg is about 50 km from Tzaneen and about 12.5 km from Maake plaza. It has 5 official villages namely Rhulani , Hovheni, Solani and Nyanyukani. Bordeaux, a farm that the Late Hosi Muhlaba bought and later bequeathed to his brothers upon his death, is commonly mistaken to be part of Julesburg but it is not. The areas nearer to Julesburg are Mogapeng, Tours, Ofcolaco, Calais and Burgersdorp.

Tito Mboweni, the former ANC Minister of Labour, Finance and Governor of the Reserve Bank is not from Julesburg but from one of the 3 portions of the farm Bordeaux, which borders Julesburg to the east. Schools are Dumela High School, Rhulani Primary School, Mageza Secondary School, Bordeax Primary School, Hovheni Primary School, and lastly Phyuphyani Secondary School. Julesburg has one clinic namely Julesburg Healthcare Centre.

Julesburg has many churches, to name a few, the famous AFM (Azuza Faith Mission) in Bordeax, ZCC, Imvano Getsemane of God and In Zion of Christ. There are two soccer clubs playing in the SAB league namely Julesburg Young Killers and Julesburg Arsenal.
