= Adler Hotel =

150 room kosher hotel in New York, built in 1929 in the Spanish Colonial Revival Style

- Interactive map of the Adler Hotel area

General information
- Location: Sharon Springs, New York, U.S.
- Coordinates: 42°47′55.4″N 074°36′54.4″W
- Opened: 1929
- Closed: 2004
- Cost: $250,000

Design and construction
- Developer: Louis Adler

The Adler Hotel, also known as the Hotel Adler, was a 150-room, five-story hotel in Sharon Springs, New York, that operated from 1929 until 2004. Known for its therapeutic sulfur spa, it catered primarily to a Jewish clientele who travelled to Sharon Springs in the summers. It was kosher, with two kitchens. It was built in the Spanish Colonial Revival style and was adjacent to the Pavilion Hotel (demolished in 1941), which had been a summer destination for guests such as the Vanderbilts, Rensselaers, and Oscar Wilde. Ed Koch worked as a busboy at the Adler Hotel in 1946. When Steven Spielberg was preparing for Schindler's List, he interviewed survivors staying at the hotel.

== Ownership ==
The hotel was built by Louis Adler for $250,000. He operated the hotel until selling it in the 1950s and later owned and operated hotels in Miami Beach, Florida, including the Allison Hotel. Bernard and Hilda Wieder, noted Miami Beach hoteliers, purchased the Adler Hotel in 1951. Mordecai Yarkony bought the hotel for $75,000 in 1972 and operated it as Yarkony’s Adler Hotel from until 2004, when Sharon Springs, Inc., a Korean-American investment group based in New York City, purchased the derelict building and other buildings in the town for $750,000. The group has plans to renovate the hotel. As of April 2026, the property is for sale for $140,000 and in need of extensive restoration and renovation.
