= Burgersdorp, Limpopo =

Burgersdorp Xithuve
- Location within Limpopo Location within South Africa
- Coordinates: 24.008°S 30.307°E
- Country: South Africa
- Province: Limpopo
- District: Mopani
- Municipality: Greater Tzaneen

Government
  - Councillor: Willy Maake

Area
  - Total: 5.07 km^{2} (1.96 sq mi)

Population (2011)
  - Total: 6,347
  - Density: 1,250/km^{2} (3,240/sq mi)

Racial makeup (2011)
  - Black African: 99.9%
  - Indian/Asian: 0.1%

First languages (2011)
  - Tsonga: 88.0%
  - Northern Sotho: 6.3%
  - Sotho: 4.5%
  - Other: 1.2%
- Time zone: UTC+2 (SAST)
- Postal code (street): 0850
- PO box: 0772
- Area code: 015

Burgersdorp is a village in Mopani District Municipality in the Limpopo province of South Africa. Burgersdorp is located 32 km south east of Tzaneen on the R36 road to Lydenburg.
