= Lancaster, Missouri =

City in Missouri, U.S.

- City
- Location of Lancaster, Missouri
- Coordinates: 40°31′26″N 92°31′53″W
- Country: United States
- State: Missouri
- County: Schuyler

Area
  - Total: 1.49 sq mi (3.86 km^{2})
  - Land: 1.49 sq mi (3.85 km^{2})
  - Water: 0.0039 sq mi (0.01 km^{2})
- Elevation: 942 ft (287 m)

Population (2020)
  - Total: 675
  - Density: 454.1/sq mi (175.33/km^{2})
- Time zone: UTC-6 (Central (CST))
  - Summer (DST): UTC-5 (CDT)
- ZIP code: 63548
- Area code: 660
- FIPS code: 29-40610
- GNIS feature ID: 2395624
- Website: lancastermo.com

Lancaster is a city in and the county seat of Schuyler County, Missouri, United States. As of the 2020 census, its population was 675.

Lancaster is part of the Kirksville Micropolitan Statistical Area.

== History ==
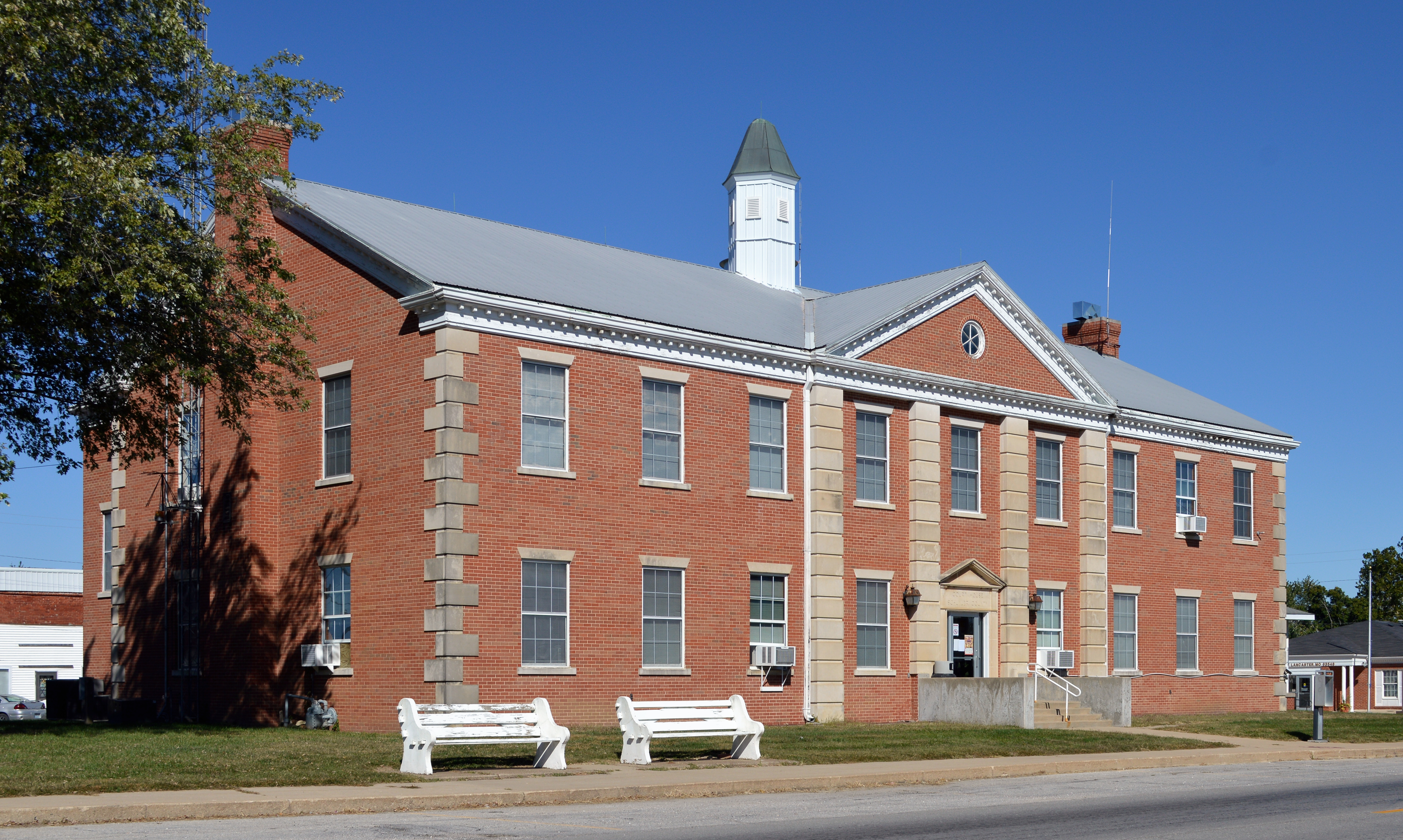
Schuyler County court house in Lancaster

A post office called Lancaster has been in operation since 1846. According to one tradition, the community was named after Lancaster, Ohio, the former home of a first settler.

The William P. Hall House was added to the National Register of Historic Places in 1975.

== Geography ==
Lancaster is located at 40°31′27″N 92°31′45″W (40.524087, -92.529190). According to the United States Census Bureau, the city has a total area of 1.50 square miles (3.88 km^{2}), of which 1.49 square miles (3.86 km^{2}) is land and 0.01 square miles (0.03 km^{2}) is water.

== Demographics ==
Historical population
Census	Pop.	Note	%±
1870	427		—
1880	528		23.7%
1890	811		53.6%
1900	980		20.8%
1910	964		−1.6%
1920	859		−10.9%
1930	807		−6.1%
1940	886		9.8%
1950	856		−3.4%
1960	740		−13.6%
1970	821		10.9%
1980	855		4.1%
1990	785		−8.2%
2000	737		−6.1%
2010	728		−1.2%
2020	675		−7.3%
U.S. Decennial Census

=== 2010 census ===
At the 2010 census there were 728 people, 326 households, and 187 families living in the city. The population density was 488.6 inhabitants per square mile (188.6/km^{2}). There were 367 housing units at an average density of 246.3 per square mile (95.1/km^{2}). The racial makup of the city was 98.2% White, 0.5% Asian, 0.1% from other races, and 1.1% from two or more races. Hispanic or Latino of any race were 0.7%.

Of the 326 households 29.4% had children under the age of 18 living with them, 39.6% were married couples living together, 14.1% had a female householder with no husband present, 3.7% had a male householder with no wife present, and 42.6% were non-families. 38.0% of households were one person and 20.8% were one person aged 65 or older. The average household size was 2.23 and the average family size was 2.96.

The median age was 38.3 years. 26.2% of residents were under the age of 18; 8.2% were between the ages of 18 and 24; 22.6% were from 25 to 44; 22.9% were from 45 to 64; and 20.2% were 65 or older. The gender makeup of the city was 46.4% male and 53.6% female.

=== 2000 census ===
At the 2000 census there were 737 people, 319 households, and 203 families living in the city. The population density was 494.7 inhabitants per square mile (191.0/km^{2}). There were 370 housing units at an average density of 248.4 per square mile (95.9/km^{2}). The racial makup of the city was 99.46% White, 0.14% Native American, 0.14% Pacific Islander, 0.27% from other races. Hispanic or Latino of any race were 0.41%.

Of the 319 households 29.5% had children under the age of 18 living with them, 51.7% were married couples living together, 10.7% had a female householder with no husband present, and 36.1% were non-families. 33.5% of households were one person and 21.6% were one person aged 65 or older. The average household size was 2.31 and the average family size was 2.93.

The age distribution was 25.4% under the age of 18, 7.7% from 18 to 24, 23.7% from 25 to 44, 19.7% from 45 to 64, and 23.5% 65 or older. The median age was 40 years. For every 100 females, there were 80.2 males. For every 100 females age 18 and over, there were 77.4 males.

The median household income was $27,202 and the median family income was $37,083. Males had a median income of $28,889 versus $19,063 for females. The per capita income for the city was $14,263. About 13.8% of families and 18.9% of the population were below the poverty line, including 29.3% of those under age 18 and 9.5% of those age 65 or over.

== Education ==
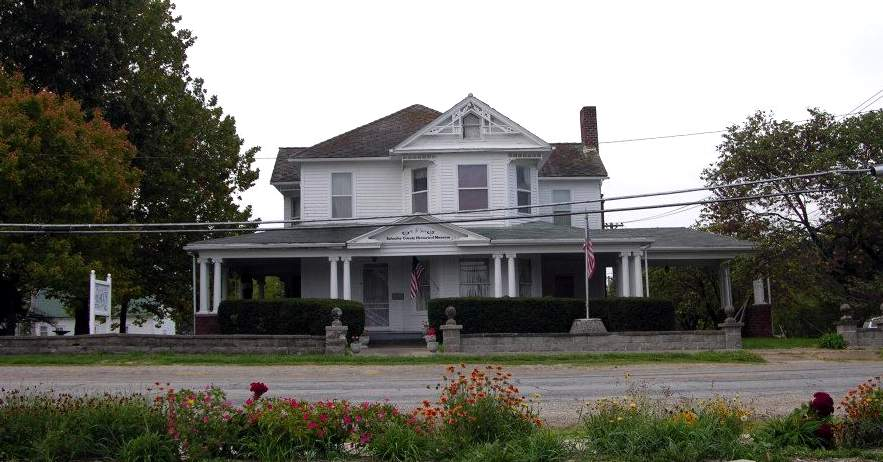
William P. Hall home in Lancaster. It now serves as the Schuyler County Historical Society museum.

It is in the Schuyler County R-I School District.

Lancaster has a public library, the Schuyler County Library District.

== Notable people ==
- William Preston Hall Circus impresario, dealer in exotic animals
- Howard R. Hughes Sr., co-founder of the Hughes Tool Company
- Rupert Hughes, well known novelist and Oscar-winning screenwriter
- Isabel Grimes Richey (1858–1910), writer

== See also ==
- List of cities in Missouri
