= Catherine Van Rensselaer =

American socialite

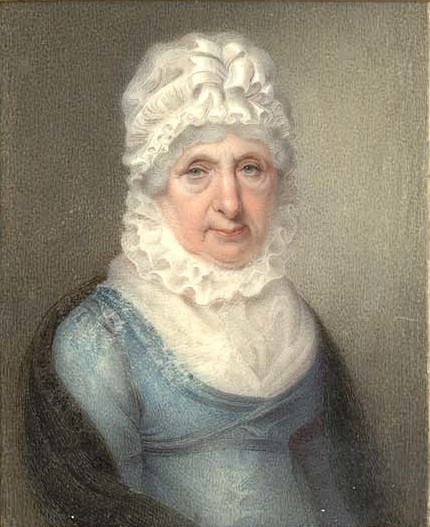
- Catherine Van Rensselaer Schuyler c. 1795 by Walter Robinson (Smithsonian American Art Museum)
- Born: November 10, 1734; Albany, Province of New York, British America
- Died: March 7, 1803 (aged 68); Albany, New York, U.S.
- Spouse: Philip Schuyler (m. 1755)
- Children: 15, including Angelica, Elizabeth, Catherine Schuyler, Cornelia Schuyler, Philip, Peggy, John Schuyler, Rensselaer
- Parent(s): Johannes Van Rensselaer; Angelica Livingston
- Family: Van Rensselaer, Schuyler

Catherine Van Rensselaer Schuyler (/ˈskaɪlər/; also known as "Kitty", November 10, 1734 – March 7, 1803) was a Colonial and post-Colonial American socialite and the matriarch of the prominent colonial Schuyler family as wife of Philip Schuyler.

== Early life ==
Kitty was born in 1734 to Col. Johannes Van Rensselaer (1708–1783), called the "Patroon of Greenbush," and Engeltie "Angelica" Livingston (1698–1747). As a child, she was known as "The Morning Star." Due to her family's social position, she was a part of the society of Albany and, once a year, would visit relatives in order to acquire "the polish of fashionable society" by being at the Court of the Royal Governor of New York."

Her paternal great-grandfather was Hendrick van Rensselaer and her 2x great-grandfather was Kiliaen Van Rensselaer, one of the original founders of the Dutch colony, New Amsterdam. Her maternal grandparents were Robert Livingston the Younger (1663–1725) and Margarita Schuyler (b. 1682), the daughter of Pieter Schuyler (1657–1724), the first mayor of Albany.

== Life ==
Kitty was once described as "a lady of great beauty, shape and gentility" and was subject to a number of suitors in the future.

Kitty's husband, Philip Schuyler, was known as a man of great wealth and intelligence as he commanded a militia in the French and Indian War and still managed to assume ownership of the large estate given to him by his father. Kitty was known as "a capable wife, mother..., and manager of the extensive Schuyler household of servants, slaves, and hired hands."

== Personal life ==
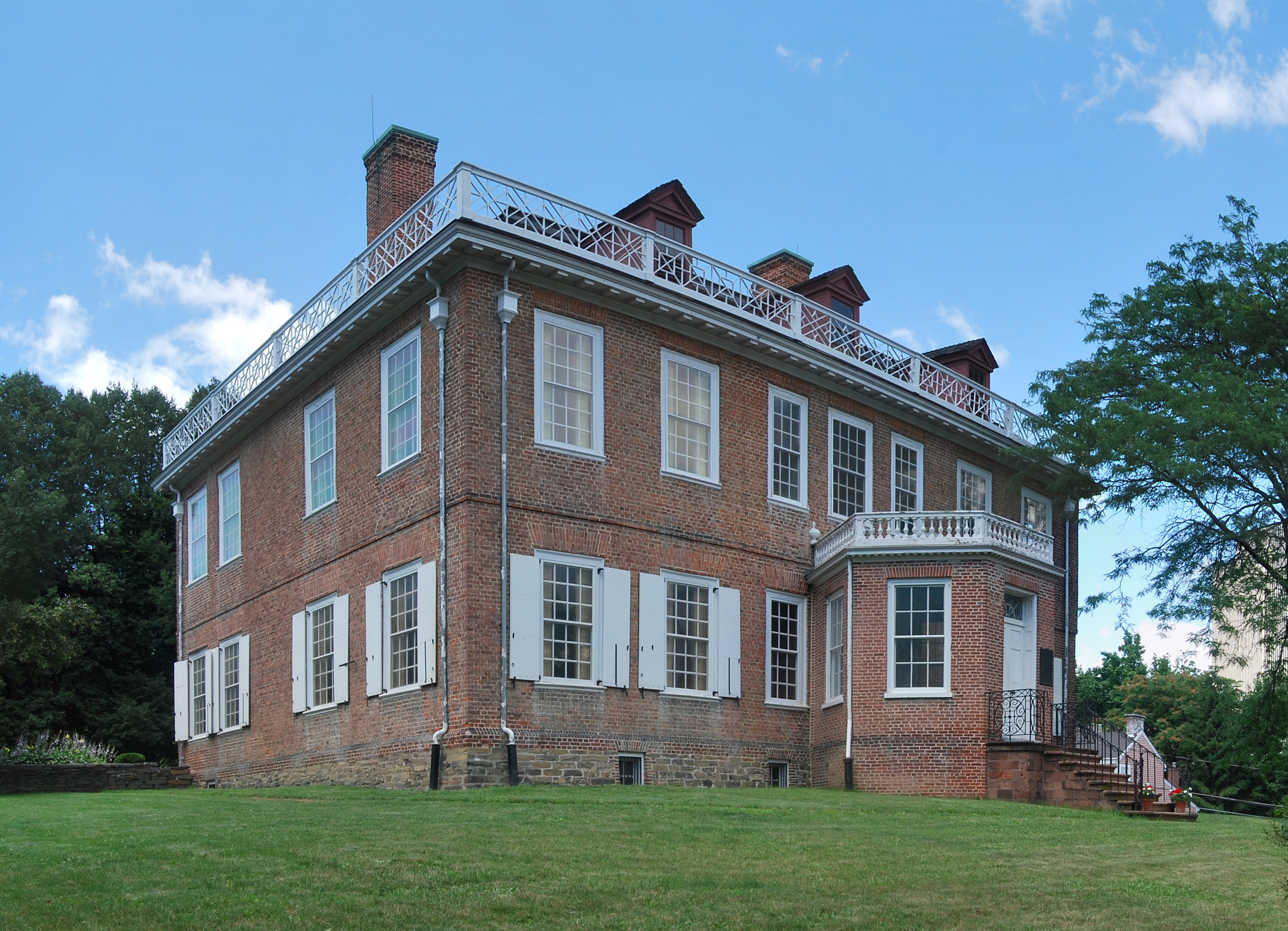
Schuyler Mansion, which was constructed from 1761 to 1765.

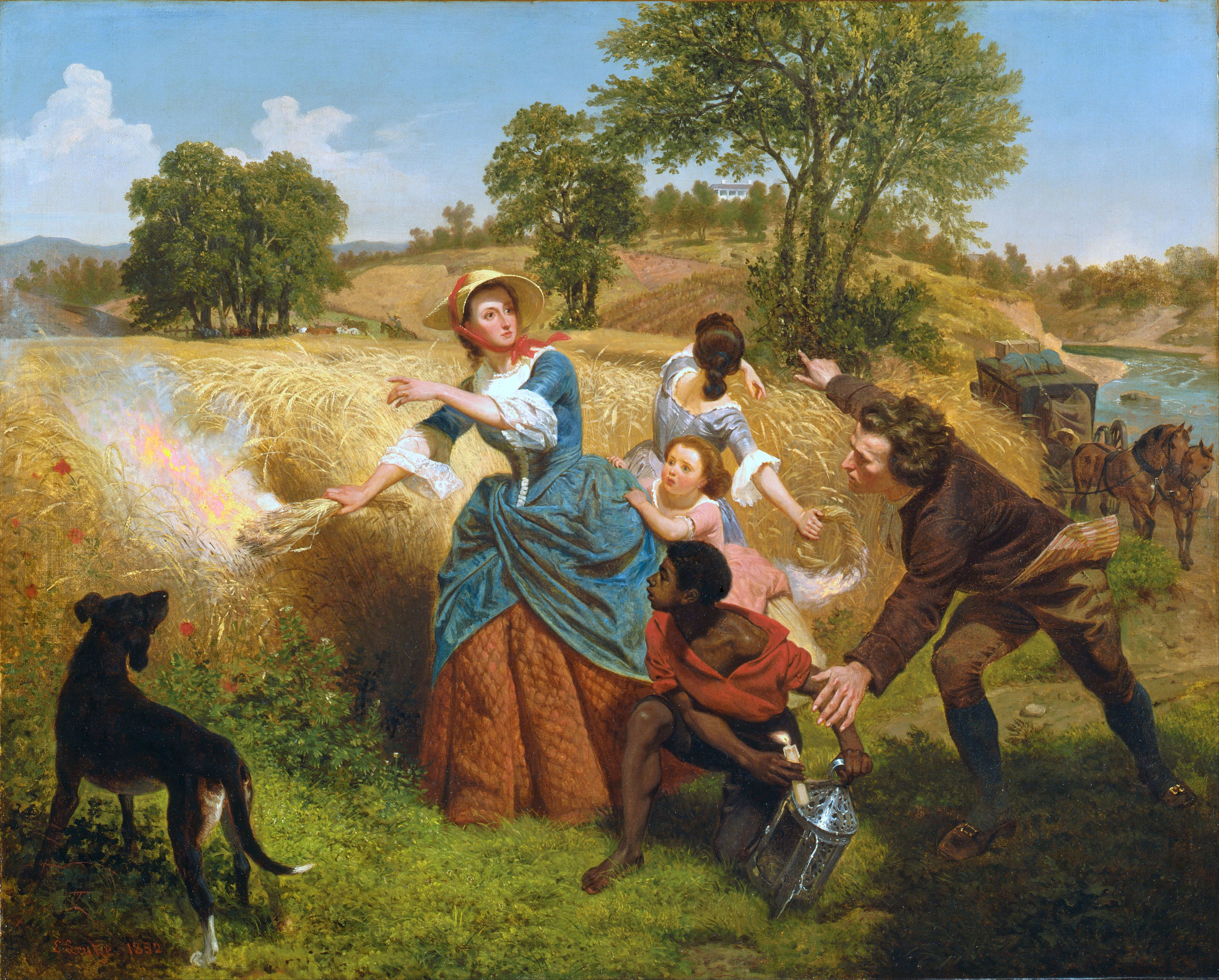
Mrs. Schuyler Burning Her Wheat Fields on the Approach of the British, painting by Emanuel Leutze, 1852.

On September 17, 1755, Catherine was married to Philip Schuyler at the Albany Dutch Church. Philip was the son of Cornelia Van Cortlandt (1698–1762) and Mayor Johannes Schuyler Jr. (1697–1741), the third generation of the Dutch family in America. Together, Philip and Catherine had fifteen children, eight of whom survived to adulthood:

- Angelica Schuyler (1756–1814), who married John Barker Church (1748–1818), later a British MP.
- Elizabeth Schuyler (1757–1854), who married Alexander Hamilton (1755/7–1804), later the first Secretary of the Treasury. Elizabeth co-founded the first orphanage in New York City.
- Margarita "Peggy" Schuyler (1758–1801), who married Stephen Van Rensselaer III (1764–1839), 8th Patroon.
- Cornelia (1761–1762).
- Unnamed Son Schuyler, Twin to Cornelia (1761–1761).
- John Bradstreet Schuyler (1763–1764).
- John Bradstreet Schuyler (1765–1795), who married Elizabeth Van Rensselaer (1768–1841), the sister of Stephen Van Rensselaer III who married his sister Peggy.
- Philip Jeremiah Schuyler (1768–1835), who married first, Sarah Rutsen (d. 1805), and after her death, Mary Anna Sawyer. Philip served in the U.S. House of Representatives.
- Triplets (1770–1770, Unbaptized).
- Rensselaer Schuyler (1773–1847), who married Elizabeth Ten Broeck, daughter of General Abraham Ten Broeck.
- Cornelia Schuyler (1776–1808), who married Washington Morton.
- Cortlandt Schuyler (1778–1778).
- Catherine Van Rensselaer Schuyler (1781–1857), who married first, Samuel Malcolm (son of William Malcolm), and then James Cochran (1769–1848), her cousin and the son of John Cochran and Gertrude Schuyler, Philip Schuyler's sister.

Catherine died of a stroke in March 1803 at the age of 68.
