= Henry (Hendrick) I. Van Rensselaer House =

Historic house in New York, United States

- U.S. National Register of Historic Places
- Location within New York Location within the United States
- Location: Jct. of Yates Rd. and NY 9H/23, Greenport, New York
- Coordinates: 42°11′18″N 73°45′26″W
- Area: 29 acres (12 ha)
- Built: 1785
- Architectural style: Georgian
- NRHP reference No.: 93000947
- Added to NRHP: September 16, 1993

Henry (Hendrick) I. Van Rensselaer House, also known as Hudson Bush Farm, is a historic home located at Greenport in Columbia County, New York. It was built in 1785 and is a large, rectangular, two story, brick dwelling measuring 55 feet wide by 40 feet deep. It features a five bay central entrance front facade, second story Palladian window in the Georgian style, and is topped by a hipped roof. Also on the property is a smoke house, built about 1785.

It was added to the National Register of Historic Places in 1993.
