= Philip Schuyler =

American military officer and politician (1733–1804)

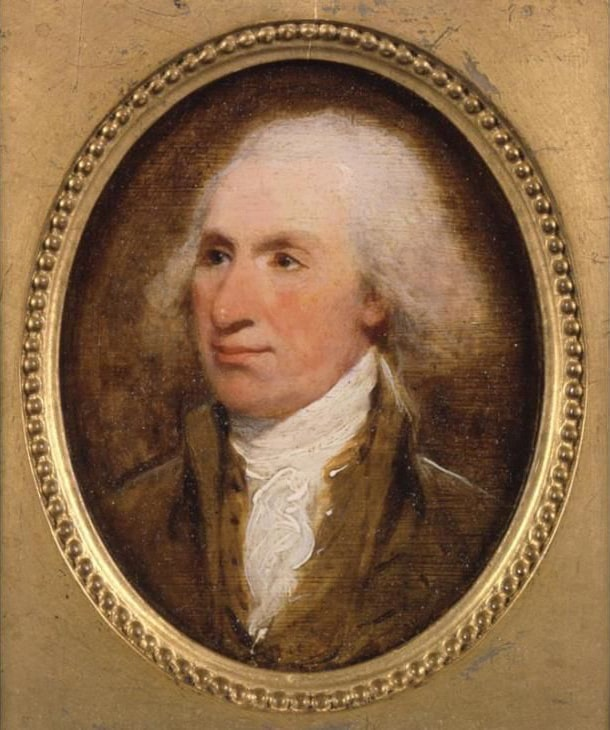
- Portrait by John Trumbull, 1792

United States Senator from New York
- In office March 4 1797 – January 3, 1798
- Preceded by: Aaron Burr
- Succeeded by: John Sloss Hobart
- In office July 16, 1789 – March 3, 1791
- Preceded by: Office established
- Succeeded by: Aaron Burr

1st Surveyor General of New York
- In office March 30, 1781 – May 13, 1784
- Preceded by: Office established
- Succeeded by: Simeon De Witt

Personal details
- Born: November 20, 1733 Albany, Province of New York, British America
- Died: November 18, 1804 (aged 70) Albany, New York, U.S.
- Resting place: Albany Rural Cemetery
- Party: Federalist
- Spouse: Catherine Van Rensselaer (m. 1755; died 1803)
- Children: Angelica; Elizabeth; Peggy; John; Philip; Rensselaer; Cornelia; Catherine
- Parent(s): Johannes Schuyler, Jr. Cornelia van Cortlandt
- Relatives: See Schuyler family
- Profession: Soldier, Statesman

Military service
- Allegiance: Great Britain; United States
- Branch/service: New York Provincial Troops; New York Militia; Continental Army
- Years of service: 1755–1767 (N.Y. Militia); 1775–1779 (Continental Army)
- Rank: Captain (NY); Colonel (NY); Major general (USA)
- Battles/wars: French and Indian War; Battle of Lake George; Battle of Fort Oswego; Battle of Carillon; Battle of Fort Frontenac; American Revolutionary War; Siege of Fort Ticonderoga (1777); Battle of Saratoga

Philip John Schuyler (/ˈskaɪlər/; November 20, 1733 – November 18, 1804) was an American military officer and politician who fought in the American Revolutionary War and served as a United States Senator from New York. He is usually known as Philip Schuyler, while his son is usually known as Philip J. Schuyler.

Born in Albany, Province of New York, into the prosperous Schuyler family, Schuyler fought in the French and Indian War. He won election to the New York General Assembly in 1768 and to the Continental Congress in 1775. He planned the Continental Army's 1775 Invasion of Quebec, but poor health forced him to delegate command of the invasion to Richard Montgomery. He prepared the Continental Army's defense of the 1777 Saratoga campaign, but was replaced by Major General Horatio Gates as the commander of Continental forces in the theater. Schuyler resigned from the Continental Army in 1779.

Schuyler served in the New York State Senate for most of the 1780s and supported the ratification of the United States Constitution. He represented New York in the 1st United States Congress but lost his state's 1791 Senate election to Aaron Burr, a foe of his son-in-law. After a period in the state senate, he won election to the United States Senate again in 1797, affiliating with the Federalist Party. He resigned due to poor health the following year. He was the father of Elizabeth Schuyler Hamilton and the father-in-law of Secretary of the Treasury Alexander Hamilton.

== Early life ==
Philip John Schuyler was born on 21 November [O.S. 10 November] 1733 in Albany, New York, to Cornelia Van Cortlandt (1698–1762) and Johannes ("John") Schuyler Jr. (1697–1741), the third generation of the Dutch Schuyler family in America. His maternal grandfather was Stephanus Van Cortlandt, the 17th Mayor of New York City.

Before his father died on the eve of his eighth birthday, Schuyler attended the public school in Albany. Afterward, he was educated by tutors at the Van Cortlandt family estate at New Rochelle. Fluent in both Dutch and English from childhood, in 1748 he began to study with Reverend Peter Strouppe at the New Rochelle French Protestant Church, where he learned French and mathematics. While he was at New Rochelle, he also joined numerous trade expeditions where he met Iroquois leaders and learned to speak Mohawk.

Schuyler joined the British forces in 1755 during the French and Indian War, raised a provincial company, and was commissioned as its captain by his cousin, Lieutenant Governor James Delancey. In 1756, he accompanied British officer Colonel John Bradstreet to Oswego, where he gained experience as a quartermaster, which ended when the outpost fell to the French. Schuyler took part in the battles of Oswego River (Battle Island) and Fort Frontenac.

After the war, Bradstreet sent Schuyler to England to settle Bradstreet's reimbursement claims for expenses he incurred during the war effort, and he remained in England from 1760 to 1763. After returning to British America he took over management of several farms and business enterprises in upstate New York, including a lumber venture in Saratoga. In addition, Schuyler was responsible for constructing the first flax mill in the American colonies. Schuyler became colonel and commander of a militia district regiment in 1767. In 1768, he served as a member of the New York Assembly.

== American Revolution ==
Schuyler was elected to the Continental Congress in 1775 and served until he was appointed a major general of the Continental Army in June. General Schuyler took command of the Northern Department and planned the Invasion of Quebec. His poor health required him to place Richard Montgomery in command of the invasion. In 1777, he again served in the Continental Congress.

=== Saratoga campaign ===
After returning to the command of the Northern Department in 1777, Schuyler was active in preparing a defense against the Saratoga Campaign, part of a British "Three Pronged Attack" strategy to cut the American Colonies in two by invading and occupying New York. During his preparation efforts, Schuyler complained to Major General William Heath about the quality of the reinforcements sent to him, writing that "one third of the few that have been sent are boys, aged men and negroes, who disgrace our arms ... Is it consistent with the Sons of Freedom to trust their all to be defended by slaves?"

In the summer of 1777, John Burgoyne marched his army south from Quebec and through the valleys of Lakes Champlain and George. On the way he invested the small American garrison occupying Fort Ticonderoga at the nexus of the two lakes. When General Arthur St. Clair abandoned Fort Ticonderoga in July, Congress replaced Schuyler with General Horatio Gates, who had accused Schuyler of dereliction of duty. In 1778, Schuyler and Arthur St. Clair faced a court of inquiry over the loss of Ticonderoga, and both were acquitted.

The British offensive was eventually stopped by the Continental Army in the Battles of Saratoga. That victory, the first complete victory over a large British force, marked a turning point in the revolution, for it convinced France to enter the war on the American side. When Schuyler demanded a court martial to answer Gates' charges, he was vindicated but resigned from the Continental Army on April 19, 1779. He then served in two more sessions of the Continental Congress in 1779 and 1780.

== Later career ==
As a prominent politician and Patriot leader in New York, Schuyler was the subject of an unsuccessful kidnapping attempt, which was plotted and led by John Walden Meyers on August 7, 1781. Schuyler was able to vacate his Albany mansion before the kidnappers arrived. Schuyler was an original member of the New York Society of the Cincinnati.

After the war, he expanded his Saratoga estate to tens of thousands of acres, adding slaves, tenant farmers, a store, and mills for flour, flax, and lumber. He built several schooners on the Hudson River, and named the first Saratoga. According to the Schuyler Mansion State Historic Site, Schuyler had as many as 40 slaves between the Albany and Saratoga estates. In 1785, he was a founder of the New York Manumission Society, which advocated for gradual abolition. In 1790, he enslaved 27 persons. In 1800, he owned about 11; at his death in 1804, he had none, having either conveyed them to others or manumitted them.

He was a member of the New York State Senate from 1780 to 1784, and at the same time New York State Surveyor General from 1781 to 1784. Afterwards, he returned to the State Senate from 1786 to 1790, where he actively supported the adoption of the United States Constitution.

In 1789, he was elected a U.S. Senator from New York to the First United States Congress, serving from July 27, 1789, to March 3, 1791. After losing his bid for re-election in 1791 to Aaron Burr, he returned to the State Senate from 1792 to 1797. In 1797, he was selected again to the U.S. Senate and served in the 5th United States Congress from March 4, 1797, until his resignation because of ill health on January 3, 1798.

== Personal life ==
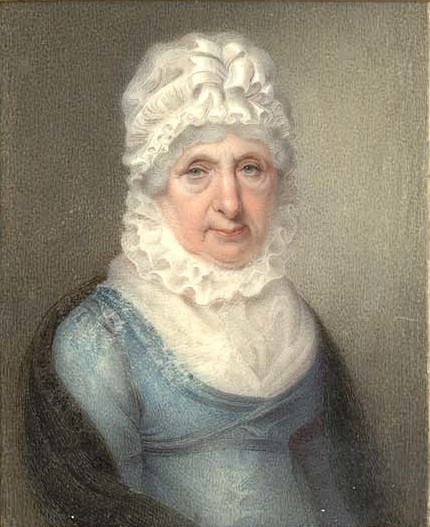
Schuyler's wife, Catherine Van Rensselaer, depicted in a portrait by Walter Robinson, c. 1795

According to the Schuyler Family's Bible, on September 7, 1755, he married Catherine Van Rensselaer (1734–1803) at Albany. In the Bible entry, he was called "Philip Johannes Schuyler" and she was called "Catherina Van Rensselaer". She was the daughter of Johannes Van Rensselaer (1707/08–1783) and his first wife, Engeltje Livingston (1698–1746/47). Johannes was the grandson of Hendrick van Rensselaer (1667–1740). Engeltje was the daughter of Robert Livingston the Younger. Philip and Catherine had 15 children together, eight of whom survived to adulthood, including:

- Angelica Schuyler (1756–1814), who married John Barker Church (1748–1818), later a British MP.
- Elizabeth Schuyler (1757–1854), who married Alexander Hamilton (1755/7–1804), later the first Secretary of the Treasury. Elizabeth co-founded the first orphanage in New York City.
- Margarita "Peggy" Schuyler (1758–1801), who married Stephen Van Rensselaer III (1764–1839), 8th Patroon.
- Cornelia (1761–1762).
- Unnamed Son Schuyler, Twin to Cornelia (1761–1761).
- John Bradstreet Schuyler (1763–1764).
- John Bradstreet Schuyler (1765–1795), who married Elizabeth Van Rensselaer (1768–1841), the sister of Stephen Van Rensselaer III who married his sister Peggy.
- Philip Jeremiah Schuyler (1768–1835), who married first, Sarah Rutsen (d. 1805), and after her death, Mary Anna Sawyer. Philip served in the U.S. House of Representatives.
- Triplets (1770–1770, Unbaptized).
- Rensselaer Schuyler (1773–1847), who married Elizabeth Ten Broeck, daughter of General Abraham Ten Broeck.
- Cornelia Schuyler (1776–1808), who married Washington Morton.
- Cortlandt Schuyler (1778–1778).
- Catherine Van Rensselaer Schuyler (1781–1857), who married first, Samuel Malcolm (son of William Malcolm), and then James Cochran (1769–1848), her cousin and the son of John Cochran and Gertrude Schuyler, Philip Schuyler's sister.

Schuyler also adopted an Acadian orphan who took the name Henry Schuyler Thibodaux. He later became the fourth governor of Louisiana and the namesake of Thibodaux, Louisiana.

Schuyler's country home had been destroyed by General John Burgoyne's forces in October 1777. Later that year, he began rebuilding on the same site, now located in southern Schuylerville, New York. This later home is maintained by the National Park Service as part of the Saratoga National Historical Park, and is open to the public.

Schuyler died at the Schuyler Mansion in Albany on November 18, 1804, four months after his son-in-law, Alexander Hamilton, was killed in a duel and two days before his 71st birthday. He is buried at Albany Rural Cemetery in Menands, New York.

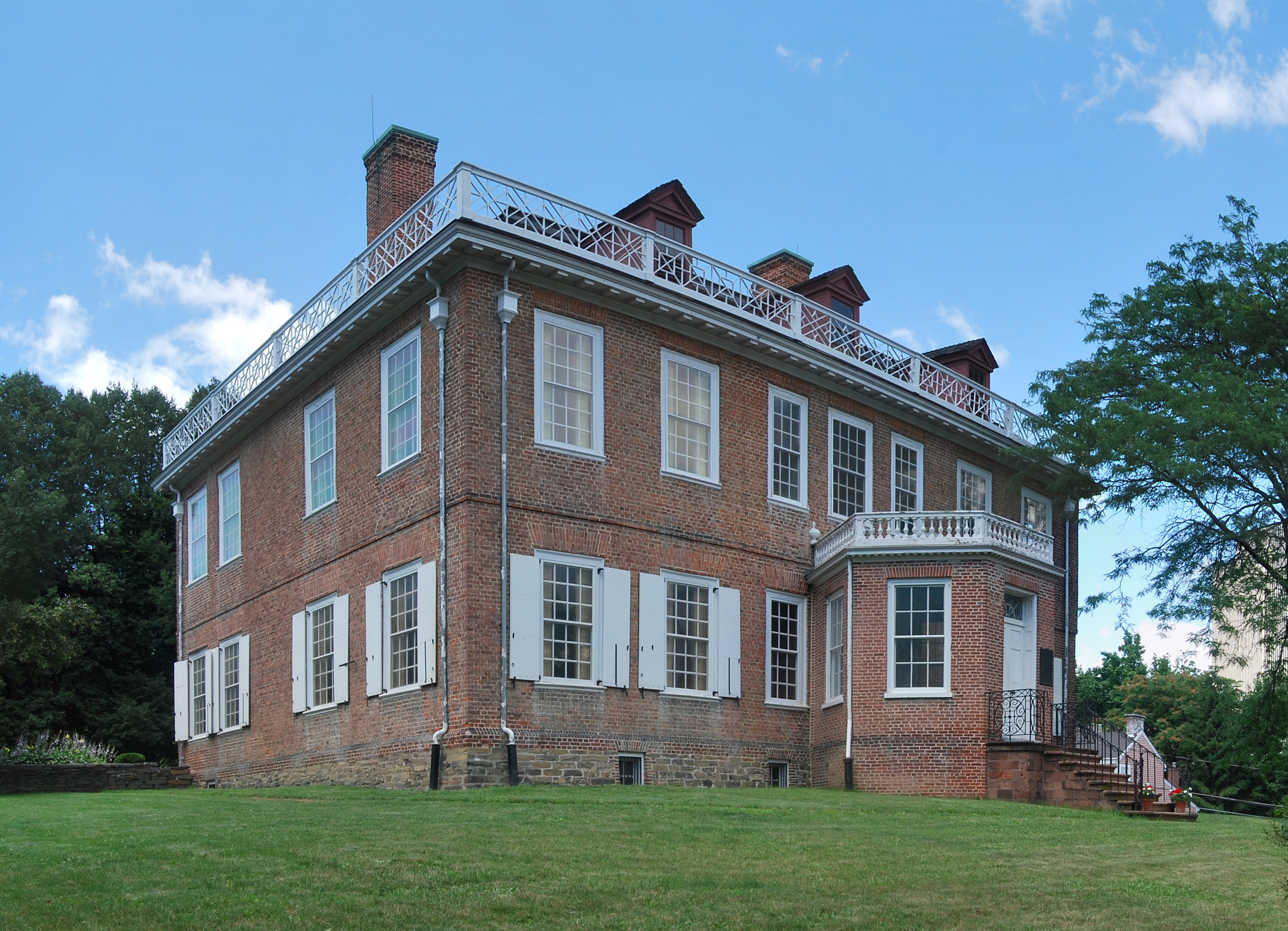
Schuyler Mansion, which was constructed from 1761 to 1765

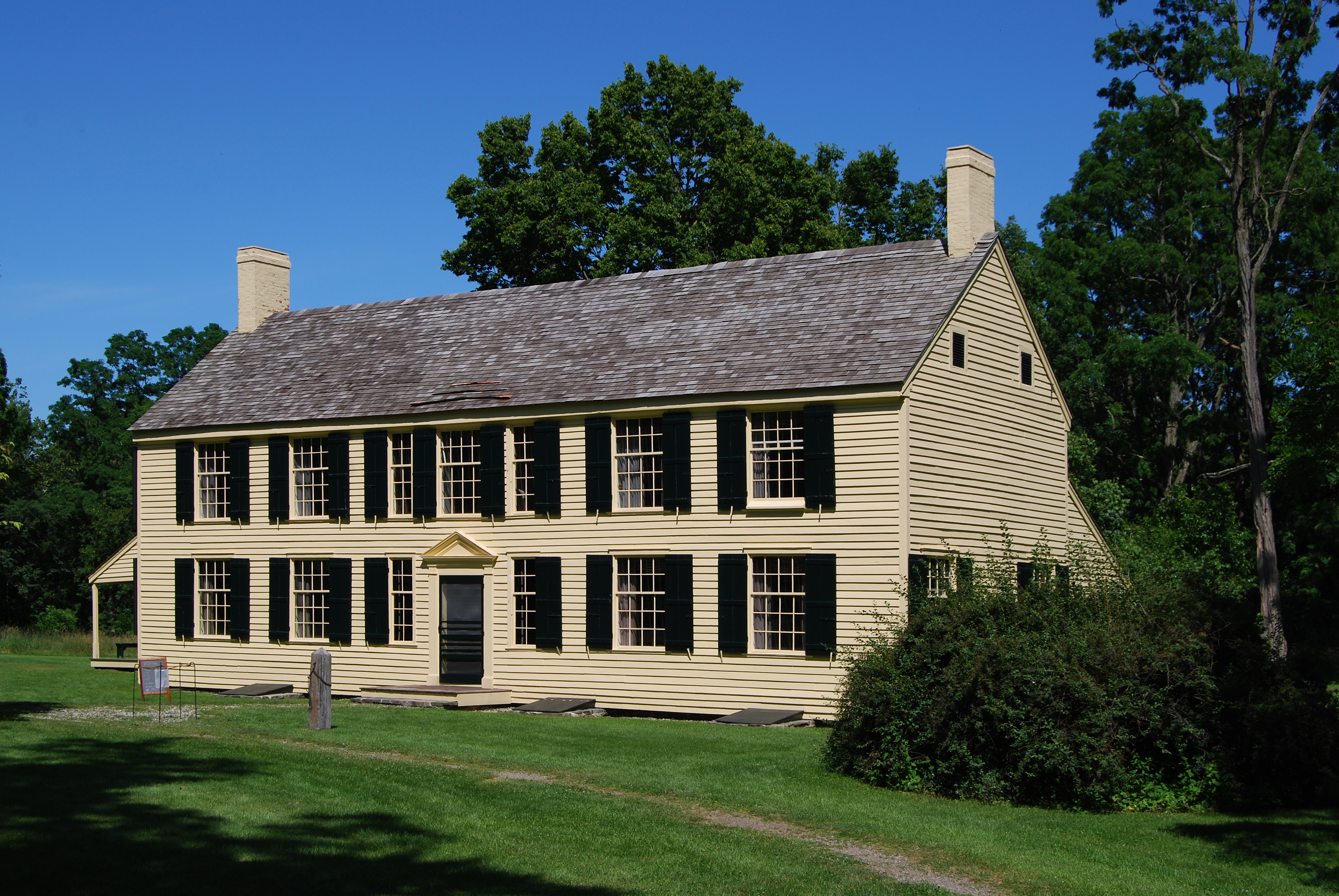
Schuyler's Country House used during the Revolution, in Schuylerville

== Legacy ==
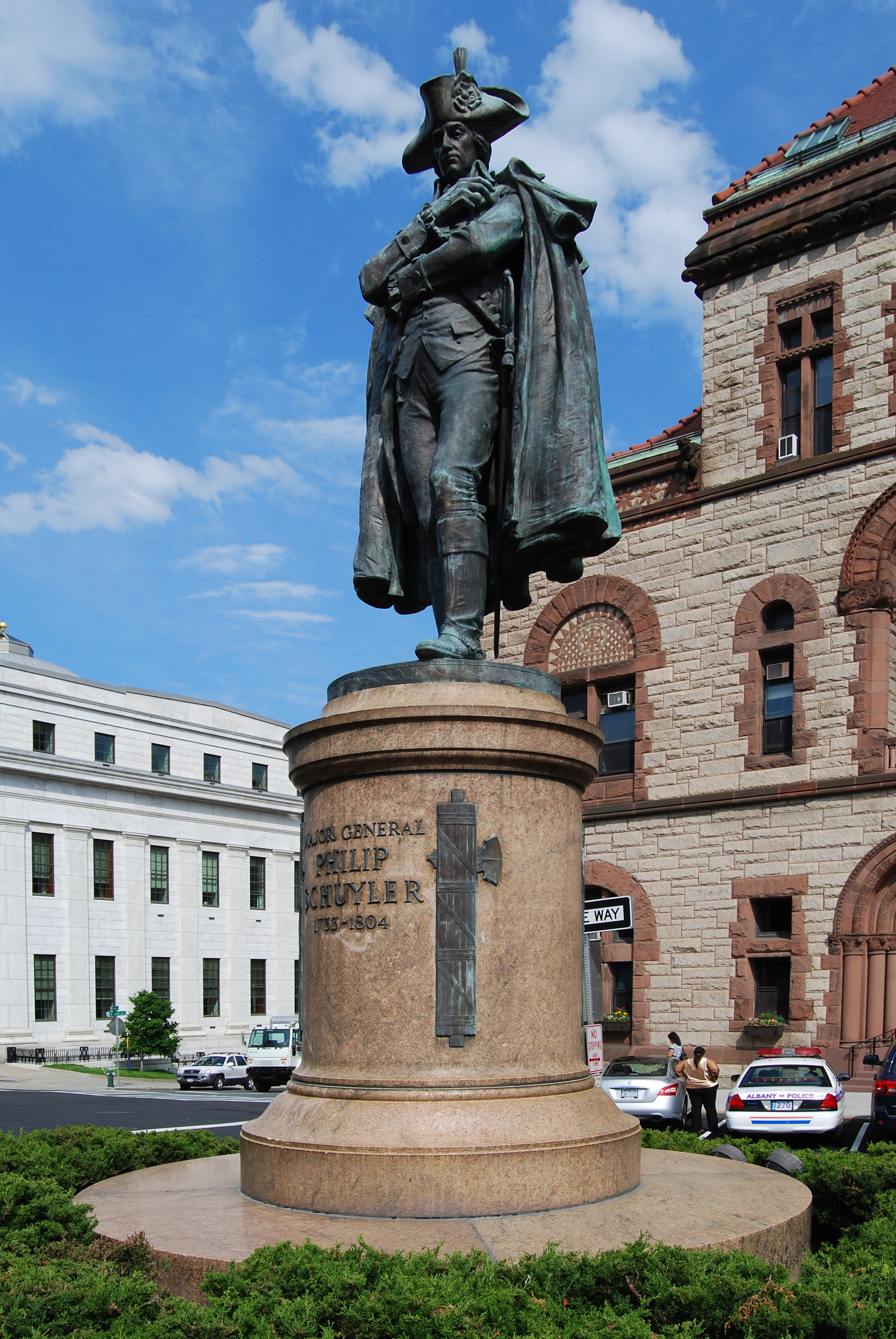
Statue in its former location outside Albany City Hall

=== Place names ===
Geographic locations and buildings named in Schuyler's honor include:

- Schuyler, New York
- Schuylerville, New York
- Schuyler County, New York, as well as Schuyler County, Illinois, and Schuyler County, Missouri
- Fort Schuyler, a military fortification begun in 1833 at the tip of Throggs Neck in the Bronx, which now houses the Maritime Industry Museum and the State University of New York Maritime College
- The Philip Schuyler Achievement Academy (named for Schuyler and his son Philip) in Albany, New York (name change expected in 2021)

=== Works of art ===
Schuyler was depicted by John Trumbull in his 1821 painting Surrender of General Burgoyne, which hangs in the United States Capitol rotunda in Washington, D.C.

Major General Philip Schuyler, a bronze statue by sculptor J. Massey Rhind, was erected outside Albany City Hall in 1925. In June 2020, Albany mayor Kathy Sheehan signed an executive order for the statue to be removed and given to a "museum or other institution for future display with appropriate historical context" because Schuyler owned slaves. The statue was requested the next day by the mayor of Schuylerville, New York, who suggested that it be moved to Schuyler House. In the early morning of June 10, 2023, the statue was removed from its pedestal, then transported by trailer to an undisclosed storage location. After the statue was removed, a time capsule was discovered underneath in a sealed metal box.

=== In popular culture ===
The non-speaking role of Philip Schuyler was originated by ensemble member Sydney James Harcourt in the 2015 Broadway musical Hamilton, in which Schuyler's son-in-law Alexander Hamilton is the title character.

Political offices
Preceded by new office	New York State Surveyor General; 1781–1784	Succeeded by Simeon De Witt
U.S. Senate
Preceded by None	U.S. senator (Class 1) from New York; 1789–1791; Served alongside: Rufus King	Succeeded by Aaron Burr
Preceded by Aaron Burr	U.S. senator (Class 1) from New York; 1797–1798; Served alongside: John Laurance	Succeeded by John Sloss Hobart
