= Peggy Schuyler =

Sister-in-law of Alexander Hamilton

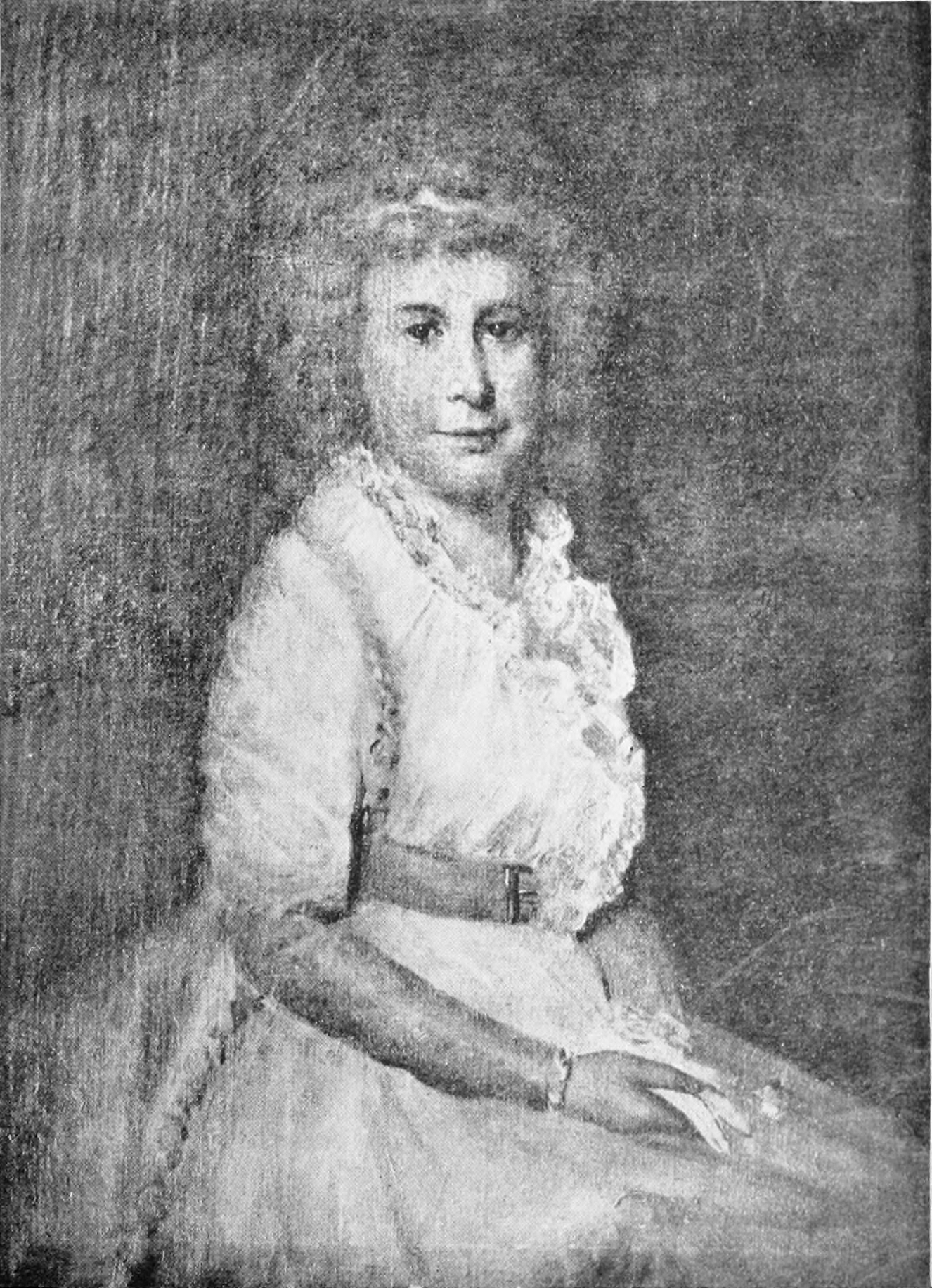
- Unknown artist. Reproduced in 1897's A Godchild of Washington: A Picture of the Past.
- Born: Margarita Schuyler; September 19, 1758; Albany, Province of New York
- Died: March 14, 1801 (aged 42); Albany, New York, U.S.
- Resting place: Albany Rural Cemetery, Menands, New York
- Spouse: Stephen Van Rensselaer III (m. 1783)
- Children: 3, including Stephen Van Rensselaer IV
- Parent(s): Philip Schuyler; Catherine Van Rensselaer
- Relatives: See Schuyler family

Margarita "Peggy" Schuyler Van Rensselaer (September 19, 1758 – March 14, 1801) was the third daughter of Continental Army General Philip Schuyler. She was the wife of Stephen Van Rensselaer III, sister of Angelica Schuyler Church, Philip Jeremiah Schuyler, and Elizabeth Schuyler Hamilton, and sister-in-law of John Barker Church and Alexander Hamilton.

== Early life ==
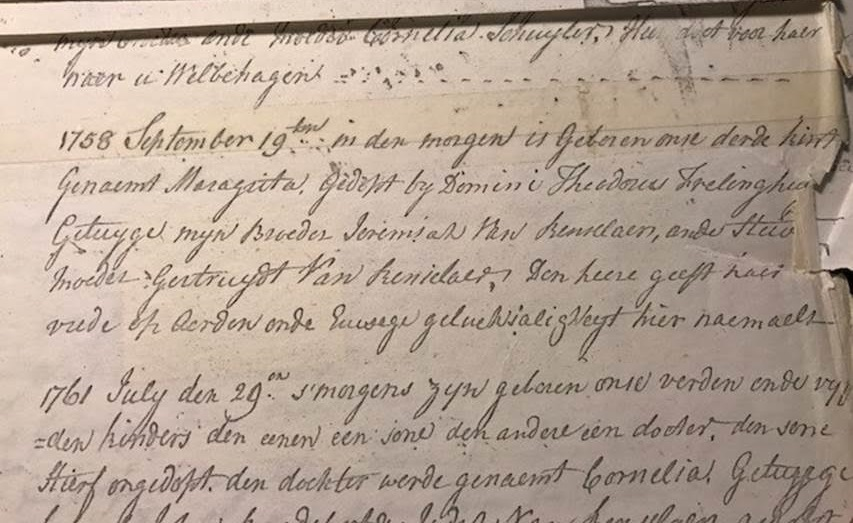
Photo of page in Schuyler family Bible noting Peggy Schuyler's birth. Notation is in Dutch: the English translation of the relevant portion is "1758 19th September- Margarita- Lord Give her peace on Earth & everlasting Glory".

Margarita, also called Peggy, Schuyler was born in Albany, New York on September 19, 1758, the third daughter of Catherine Van Rensselaer Schuyler (1734–1803) and Philip Schuyler (1733–1804), a wealthy patroon and major general in the Continental Army during the American Revolution. She had seven siblings who lived to adulthood, including Philip Jeremiah Schuyler (1768–1835), Angelica Schuyler Church (1756–1814) and Elizabeth Schuyler Hamilton (1757–1854).

Her maternal grandparents were Johannes Van Rensselaer (1707/08–1783) and his first wife, Engeltje Livingston (1698–1746/47). Johannes was the grandson of Hendrick van Rensselaer (1667–1740).

The Schuyler family was among the wealthy Dutch landowners who had settled around Albany in the mid-1600s, and both her mother and father came from wealthy and well-regarded families. Despite the unrest of the French and Indian War, which her father served in and which was fought in part near her childhood home, Peggy's childhood was spent comfortably, including receiving from her mother a basic education and training in domestic skills including sewing. Like most Dutch families of the area, the Schuylers attended the Dutch Reformed Church in Albany.

== American Revolution ==
On August 7, 1781, a group of Tories and Native Americans forced their way into the Schuyler Mansion in Albany, searching for Philip Schuyler, whom they intended to make a prisoner of war. According to a story which may be legend, family members and guests, including Eliza and Angelica, who were both pregnant, ran upstairs to hide, but soon realized they had left Philip and Catharine Schuyler's newborn daughter, Catharine (1781–1857), downstairs. Peggy went downstairs to get the baby, but was threatened by one of the Native Americans, who asked where Philip was. Thinking quickly, Peggy replied that Schuyler had "gone to alarm the town". Fearing capture, the raiders fled, but one threw a tomahawk at Peggy, who was running upstairs with the child. The tomahawk left a cut mark in the banister, which the Schuyler family supposedly left in place as a memento. This detail begins to appear in published works in the 1830s, but no contemporary evidence of it can be found in the letters and records of Philip Schuyler or of the Loyalists, under the direction of Captain John Walter Meyer, who led the raid.

== Personal life ==
In June 1783, Peggy married Stephen Van Rensselaer III (1764–1839), a distant cousin, who was 19 at the time; she was almost 25 when they eloped. Stephen was the eldest child of Stephen Van Rensselaer II, the ninth patroon of Rensselaerswyck, and Catharina Livingston, daughter of Philip Livingston, a signer of the Declaration of Independence. The Van Rensselaers were one of the richest and most politically influential families in New York. Some friends and family argued that Van Rensselaer was "far too young" to be married, but most agreed that the marriage to Peggy would help further his career. Upon attaining his majority at age 21, Van Rensselaer assumed responsibility as lord of Van Rensselaer Manor as his father had died when he was only five years old. By 1789, their marriage had resulted in three children, all of whom were baptized at the Dutch Reformed Church in Albany. Peggy had her own activities after marrying Van Rensselaer, including sewing, making portrait miniatures, and most other Van Rensselaer duties. It was also known that Margarita's brother in law, Alexander Hamilton, wrote to her during his early courtship with her older sister Elizabeth Schuyler Hamilton. He would swoon over Elizabeth to Margarita, describing her as too beautiful for her own sex, and mainly discussed topics that revolved around Elizabeth. Only one of her and Van Rensselaer's children survived to adulthood: Stephen Van Rensselaer IV (1789–1868).

Peggy became ill in 1799. Her condition worsened during the winter of 1800–01, and she died on March 14, 1801. According to Ron Chernow, Alexander Hamilton was in Albany for legal business when her health declined, visiting her bedside often and keeping Eliza posted on developments. When Hamilton finished his court work, Peggy asked him to stay for a few days, and he complied with her wishes. In mid-March, Hamilton had to send Eliza a somber note: ‘On Saturday, my dear Eliza, your sister took leave of her sufferings and friends, I trust, to find repose and happiness in a better country.’" She was originally buried in the family plot at the Van Rensselaer estate, and later reinterred at Albany Rural Cemetery.

== In popular culture ==
Peggy was portrayed by Jasmine Cephas Jones in Hamilton, a popular 2015 Broadway musical about the life of Alexander Hamilton. Jones originated the roles of Maria Reynolds and Peggy Schuyler Off-Broadway, and reprised them when the show made its transfer to Broadway. Peggy is featured as a supporting character in the song "The Schuyler Sisters" and is a background character for much of Act 1.

== See also ==
- Schuyler family
