= Johannes Pieterse van Brugh =

New York settler

Johannes Pieterse van Brugh (1624–1697) was one of the early settlers of New Netherland and is the progenitor of the Van Brugh family in the United States. He was prominently connected with the Dutch West India Company as a fur and timber trader in both Rensselaerswyck and New Amsterdam.

== Early life and career ==
Johannes Pieterse van Brugh was born in Haarlem, The Netherlands in 1624. After emigrating to New Amsterdam, Van Brugh became a prominent trader with the Dutch West India Company and was one of the burgomasters of the city in 1656.

He prospered in New Netherland by exporting furs and timber consigned from upriver at Beverwijck. Due to his wealth, Van Brugh became a civic leader and improved his status in the new world by marrying his four daughters and two sons to some of the leading landholding families of the time.

His estate was located on property between Wall and William Streets on the west side of Pearl Street in what is today the Financial District of Manhattan.

== Personal life ==
On March 29, 1658, Van Brugh was married at New Amsterdam Dutch Reformed Church to Catharine (or Katrina) Roeloffe Jans (1629–1684), widow of Lucas Rodenburgh (1620–1655), late vice-director of Curaçao. She was the daughter of Roeloff Jansen (1602–1636) and Anneke Jans (later Bogardus) (1605–1663). Together, they were the parents of several children together including:

- Helena Van Brugh (1659–1736), who married Theunis De Kay (1659–1708), who owned land on Whitehall Street.
- Anna Van Brugh (1662–1735), who married Andries Grevenraet (1659–1710).
- Catharina Van Brugh (1665–1730), who married Hendrick van Rensselaer (1667–1740), director of the Eastern patent and son of Jeremias van Rensselaer, the acting patroon of the manor of Rensselaerswyck.
- Pieter Van Brugh (1666–1740), who served as Mayor of Albany, New York from 1699 to 1700 and again from 1721 to 1723. He married Sara Cuyler (1670–1742).
- Maria Van Brugh (1673–1724), who married Stephen Richard (1670–1730), the grandson of a French nobleman.
- Johannes Van Brugh II (1671–1720), who married Margaretta Provoost (1673–1705), sister of David Provoost, the 24th Mayor of New York City.

Van Brugh made his will on December 22, 1696 and died in 1697.

=== Descendants ===
Through his daughter Anna, he was an ancestor of J. Hooker Hamersley, the prominent Gilded Age lawyer and poet.

Through his daughter Catharina, he was the grandfather of:

- Maria Van Rensselaer (1689–1756), who married Samuel Ten Broeck (1680–1756), son of Dirck Wesselse Ten Broeck;
- Catherine Van Rensselaer (1691–1770), who married Johannes Ten Broeck (1683–1765), another son of Dirck Wesselse Ten Broeck;
- Anna Van Rensselaer (1696–1756), who married Peter Douw. They were the grandparents of Peter Gansevoort and great-great-grandparents of Herman Melville);
- Johannes Van Rensselaer (1707/08–1783), who married Engeltje Livingston (1698–1746/7) and Gertrude Van Cortlandt;
- Hendrick van Rensselaer (1712–1763), who married Elizabeth van Brugh (1712–1753) and Alida (née Livingston) Rutsen (1716–1798);
- Kiliaen van Rensselaer (1717–1781), who married Ariantje Schuyler (1720–1763) and Maria Low.

Through his son Pieter, he was the grandfather of Catharina Van Brugh (born in 1689), who married Philip Livingston (1686–1749), the second lord of Livingston Manor.
