= Schuyler County, Missouri =

County in Missouri, United States

- County
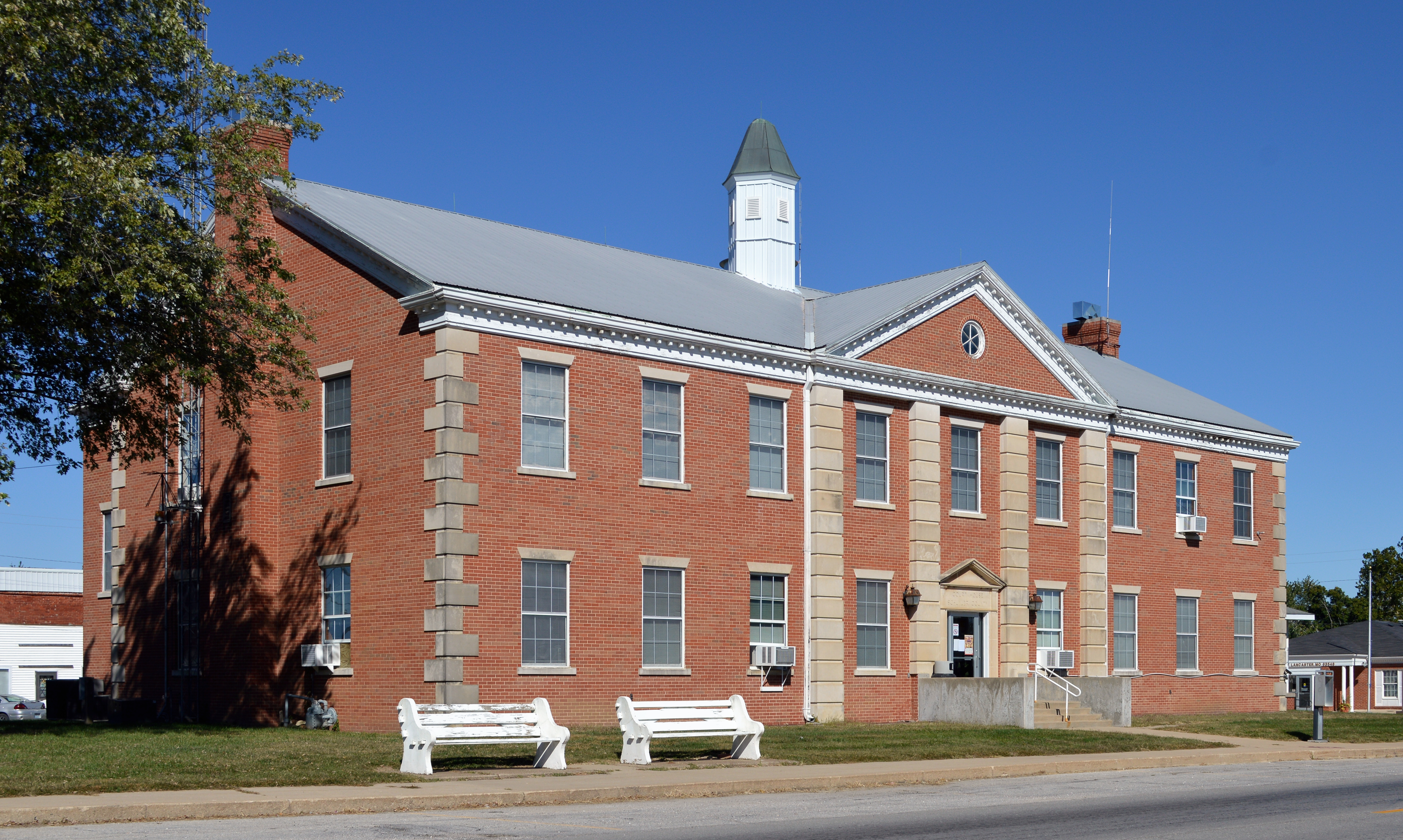
- Schuyler County court house in Lancaster

- Location within the U.S. state of Missouri
- Coordinates: 40°28′N 92°31′W
- Country: United States
- State: Missouri
- Founded: February 14, 1845
- Named for: Philip Schuyler
- Seat: Lancaster
- Largest city: Lancaster

Area
  - Total: 308 sq mi (800 km^{2})
  - Land: 307 sq mi (800 km^{2})
  - Water: 0.9 sq mi (2.3 km^{2}) 0.3%

Population (2020)
  - Total: 4,032
  - Estimate (2025): 4,140 ▲
  - Density: 13.5/sq mi (5.2/km^{2})
- Time zone: UTC−6 (Central)
  - Summer (DST): UTC−5 (CDT)
- Congressional district: 6th

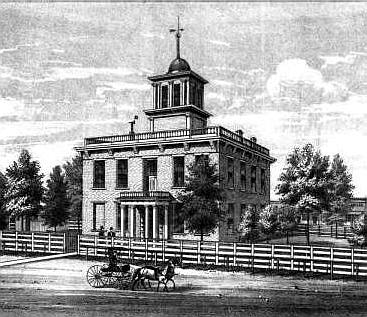
The previous courthouse as it appeared in 1878.

Schuyler County (/ˈskaɪlər/ SKY-lər) is a county located in the northeastern portion of the U.S. state of Missouri. As of the 2020 census, its population was 4,032, making it the fourth-least populous county in Missouri. Its county seat is Lancaster. The county was organized February 14, 1845, from Adair County, and named for General Philip Schuyler, delegate to the Continental Congress and U.S. Senator from New York.

Schuyler County is part of the Kirksville, MO Micropolitan Statistical Area.

USS Schuyler, a World War II-era cargo ship, was named in part for Schuyler County, Missouri.

== Geography ==
According to the U.S. Census Bureau, the county has a total area of 308 square miles (800 km^{2}), of which 307 square miles (800 km^{2}) is land and 0.9 square miles (2.3 km^{2}) (0.3%) is water. It is the second-smallest county in Missouri by area. Schuyler County borders Iowa to the north.

=== Adjacent counties ===
- Appanoose County, Iowa (northwest)
- Davis County, Iowa (northeast)
- Scotland County (east)
- Adair County (south)
- Putnam County (west)

=== Major highways ===
- U.S. Route 63
- U.S. Route 136
- Route 202

== Demographics ==
Historical population
Census	Pop.	Note	%±
1850	3,287		—
1860	6,697		103.7%
1870	8,880		32.6%
1880	10,470		17.9%
1890	11,249		7.4%
1900	10,840		−3.6%
1910	9,062		−16.4%
1920	8,383		−7.5%
1930	6,951		−17.1%
1940	6,627		−4.7%
1950	5,760		−13.1%
1960	5,052		−12.3%
1970	4,665		−7.7%
1980	4,979		6.7%
1990	4,236		−14.9%
2000	4,170		−1.6%
2010	4,431		6.3%
2020	4,032		−9.0%
2025 (est.)	4,140	▲	2.7%
U.S. Decennial Census:

=== 2020 census ===
As of the 2020 census, the county had a population of 4,032. The median age was 41.3 years, with 25.8% of residents under the age of 18 and 21.8% aged 65 years or older. For every 100 females there were 97.2 males, and for every 100 females age 18 and over there were 95.0 males.

The racial makeup of the county was 96.2% White, 0.0% Black or African American, 0.0% American Indian and Alaska Native, 0.4% Asian, 0.0% Native Hawaiian and Pacific Islander, 0.6% from some other race, and 2.8% from two or more races, while Hispanic or Latino residents of any race comprised 1.2% of the population; the accompanying table details the counts and percentages dating back to 1980.

0.0% of residents lived in urban areas, while 100.0% lived in rural areas.

There were 1,603 households in the county, of which 31.0% had children under the age of 18 living with them and 23.3% had a female householder with no spouse or partner present; about 27.7% of all households were made up of individuals and 14.5% had someone living alone who was 65 years of age or older.

There were 1,887 housing units, of which 15.1% were vacant. Among occupied housing units, 74.8% were owner-occupied and 25.2% were renter-occupied. The homeowner vacancy rate was 1.5% and the rental vacancy rate was 9.0%.

=== Racial and ethnic composition ===
Schuyler County, Missouri – Racial and ethnic composition Note: the US Census treats Hispanic/Latino as an ethnic category. This table excludes Latinos from the racial categories and assigns them to a separate category. Hispanics/Latinos may be of any race.
Race / Ethnicity (NH = Non-Hispanic)	Pop 1980	Pop 1990	Pop 2000	Pop 2010	Pop 2020	% 1980	% 1990	% 2000	% 2010	% 2020
White alone (NH)	4,933	4,207	4,086	4,353	3,864	99.08%	99.32%	97.99%	98.24%	95.83%
Black or African American alone (NH)	3	0	2	1	0	0.06%	0.00%	0.05%	0.02%	0.00%
Native American or Alaska Native alone (NH)	3	8	13	7	1	0.06%	0.19%	0.31%	0.16%	0.02%
Asian alone (NH)	3	3	7	10	15	0.06%	0.07%	0.17%	0.23%	0.37%
Native Hawaiian or Pacific Islander alone (NH)	x	x	1	0	1	x	x	0.02%	0.00%	0.02%
Other race alone (NH)	1	0	0	0	9	0.02%	0.00%	0.00%	0.00%	0.22%
Mixed race or Multiracial (NH)	x	x	34	31	95	x	x	0.82%	0.70%	2.36%
Hispanic or Latino (any race)	36	18	27	29	47	0.72%	0.42%	0.65%	0.65%	1.17%
Total	4,979	4,236	4,170	4,431	4,032	100.00%	100.00%	100.00%	100.00%	100.00%

=== 2010 census ===
As of the census of 2010, there were 4,431 people, 1,725 households, and 1,193 families residing in the county. The population density was 14 people per square mile (5.4 people/km^{2}). There were 2,027 housing units at an average density of 7 units per square mile (2.7/km^{2}). The racial makeup of the county was 98.44% White, 0.05% Black or African American, 0.31% Native American, 0.17% Asian, 0.02% Pacific Islander, 0.17% from other races, and 0.84% from two or more races. Approximately 0.65% of the population were Hispanic or Latino of any race.

There were 1,725 households, out of which 29.60% had children under the age of 18 living with them, 59.10% were married couples living together, 7.20% had a female householder with no husband present, and 30.80% were non-families. 28.20% of all households were made up of individuals, and 15.20% had someone living alone who was 65 years of age or older. The average household size was 2.39 and the average family size was 2.90.

In the county, the population was spread out, with 24.60% under the age of 18, 6.70% from 18 to 24, 24.80% from 25 to 44, 24.10% from 45 to 64, and 19.80% who were 65 years of age or older. The median age was 41 years. For every 100 females, there were 93.10 males. For every 100 females age 18 and over, there were 90.80 males.

The median income for a household in the county was $27,385, and the median income for a family was $34,564. Males had a median income of $25,625 versus $18,728 for females. The per capita income for the county was $15,850. About 13.20% of families and 17.00% of the population were below the poverty line, including 22.10% of those under age 18 and 17.60% of those age 65 or over.

== Education ==
There is one school district covering the county: Schuyler County R-I School District.

=== Public schools ===
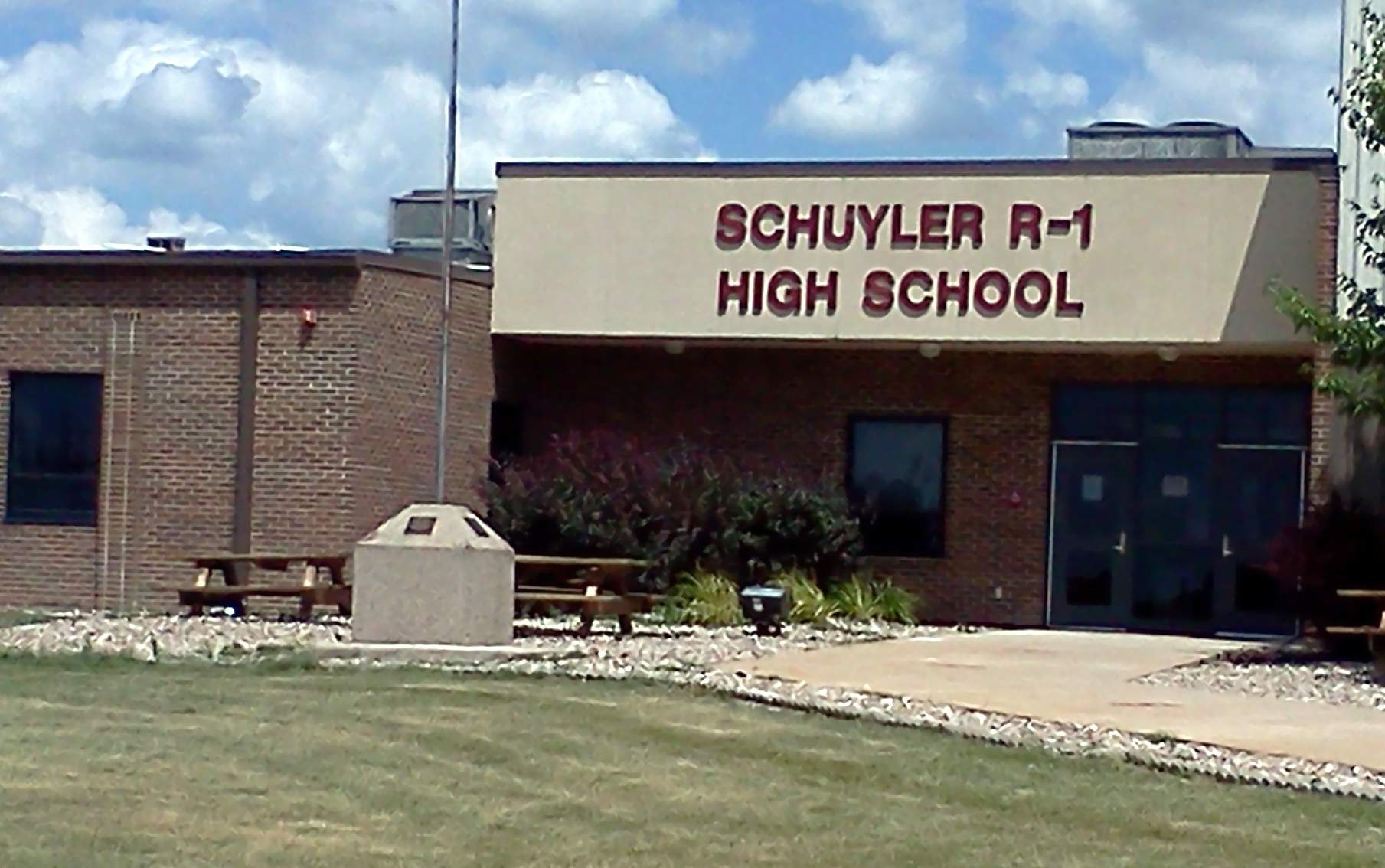
Entrance to Schuyler County R-1 High School

- Schuyler County R-1 School District – Queen City
  - Schuyler County Elementary School (K-06)
  - Schuyler County Middle School (07–08)
  - Schuyler County High School (09–12)

=== Public libraries ===
- Schuyler County Library

== Politics ==
=== Local ===
The Democratic Party predominantly controls politics at the local level in Schuyler County. Democrats hold all but four of the elected positions in the county.

Schuyler County, Missouri

Elected countywide officials
Assessor	Gary Stump	Democratic
Circuit Clerk	Judy Keim	Democratic
County Clerk	Bree Shaw	Democratic
Collector	Kathy Roberts	Democratic
Commissioner (presiding)	Rodney Cooper	Republican
Commissioner (district 1)	Jim Werner	Democratic
Commissioner (district 2)	Donald Crabtree	Republican
Coroner	Douglas B. Norman	Democratic
Prosecuting Attorney	H. Scott Summers	Democratic
Public Administrator	Ronald L. Morgan	Democratic
Recorder	Linda Blessing	Republican
Sheriff	Carl Gottman	Democratic
Surveyor	Adam Mitchell	Republican
Treasurer	Karmen Buckallew	Democratic

=== State ===
Past Gubernatorial Elections Results
Year	Republican	Democratic	Third Parties
2024	82.51% 1,552	15.10% 284	2.39% 45
2020	79.81% 1,577	18.22% 360	1.97% 39
2016	66.30% 1,259	31.28% 594	2.42% 46
2012	50.53% 961	45.58% 867	3.89% 74
2008	51.64% 1,008	45.49% 888	2.87% 56
2004	63.80% 1,278	34.80% 697	1.40% 28
2000	50.68% 1,006	47.66% 946	1.66% 34
1996	33.10% 622	64.77% 1,217	2.13% 40

All of Schuyler County is included in Missouri's 4th District in the Missouri House of Representatives and is represented by Craig Redmon (R-Canton).

Missouri House of Representatives — District 4 — Schuyler County (2016)
Party	Candidate	Votes	%	±%
Republican	Craig Redmon	1,575	100.00%	

Missouri House of Representatives — District 4 — Schuyler County (2014)
Party	Candidate	Votes	%	±%
Republican	Craig Redmon	1,201	100.00%	

Missouri House of Representatives — District 4 — Schuyler County (2012)
Party	Candidate	Votes	%	±%
Republican	Craig Redmon	1,520	100.00%	

All of Schuyler County is a part of Missouri's 18th District in the Missouri Senate and is currently represented by Brian Munzlinger (R-Williamstown).

Missouri Senate — District 18 — Schuyler County (2014)
Party	Candidate	Votes	%	±%
Republican	Brian Munzlinger	1,227	100.00%	

=== Federal ===
U.S. Senate — Missouri — Schuyler County (2016)
Party	Candidate	Votes	%	±%
Republican	Roy Blunt	1,259	66.16%	+24.49
Democratic	Jason Kander	547	28.74%	−23.02
Libertarian	Jonathan Dine	57	3.00%	−3.57
Green	Johnathan McFarland	20	1.05%	+1.05
Constitution	Fred Ryman	20	1.05%	+1.05

U.S. Senate — Missouri — Schuyler County (2012)
Party	Candidate	Votes	%	±%
Republican	Todd Akin	793	41.67%	
Democratic	Claire McCaskill	985	51.76%	
Libertarian	Jonathan Dine	125	6.57%	

All of Schuyler County is included in Missouri's 6th Congressional District and is currently represented by Sam Graves (R-Tarkio) in the U.S. House of Representatives.

U.S. House of Representatives — Missouri's 6th Congressional District — Schuyler County (2016)
Party	Candidate	Votes	%	±%
Republican	Sam Graves	1.490	79.59%	+2.49
Democratic	David M. Blackwell	331	17.68%	−1.46
Libertarian	Russ Lee Monchil	33	1.76%	−2.00
Green	Mike Diel	18	0.96%	+0.96

U.S. House of Representatives — Missouri’s 6th Congressional District — Schuyler County (2014)
Party	Candidate	Votes	%	±%
Republican	Sam Graves	1,108	77.10%	+8.35
Democratic	Bill Hedge	275	19.14%	−9.55
Libertarian	Russ Lee Monchil	54	3.76%	+1.20

U.S. House of Representatives — Missouri's 6th Congressional District — Schuyler County (2012)
Party	Candidate	Votes	%	±%
Republican	Sam Graves	1,287	68.75%	
Democratic	Kyle Yarber	537	28.69%	
Libertarian	Russ Lee Monchil	48	2.56%	

United States presidential election results for Schuyler County, Missouri
Year	Republican		Democratic		Third party(ies)	
Year	No.	%	No.	%	No.	%
1888	1,042	43.47%	1,328	55.40%	27	1.13%
1892	996	40.44%	1,263	51.28%	204	8.28%
1896	1,131	41.11%	1,592	57.87%	28	1.02%
1900	1,061	42.39%	1,335	53.34%	107	4.27%
1904	1,054	45.63%	1,139	49.31%	117	5.06%
1908	1,007	43.76%	1,222	53.11%	72	3.13%
1912	766	34.18%	1,218	54.35%	257	11.47%
1916	995	41.86%	1,341	56.42%	41	1.72%
1920	1,806	49.66%	1,793	49.30%	38	1.04%
1924	1,522	42.37%	1,982	55.18%	88	2.45%
1928	1,822	50.22%	1,797	49.53%	9	0.25%
1932	1,109	32.89%	2,239	66.40%	24	0.71%
1936	1,447	39.87%	2,173	59.88%	9	0.25%
1940	1,732	46.21%	1,998	53.31%	18	0.48%
1944	1,526	46.75%	1,729	52.97%	9	0.28%
1948	1,377	42.02%	1,892	57.74%	8	0.24%
1952	1,636	49.23%	1,680	50.56%	7	0.21%
1956	1,500	47.65%	1,648	52.35%	0	0.00%
1960	1,666	55.04%	1,361	44.96%	0	0.00%
1964	1,072	42.52%	1,449	57.48%	0	0.00%
1968	1,291	53.17%	969	39.91%	168	6.92%
1972	1,495	60.14%	991	39.86%	0	0.00%
1976	1,193	45.53%	1,417	54.08%	10	0.38%
1980	1,386	54.16%	1,114	43.53%	59	2.31%
1984	1,250	52.28%	1,141	47.72%	0	0.00%
1988	1,063	51.11%	1,013	48.70%	4	0.19%
1992	742	34.19%	936	43.13%	492	22.67%
1996	777	40.20%	857	44.34%	299	15.47%
2000	1,159	57.78%	808	40.28%	39	1.94%
2004	1,124	55.34%	894	44.02%	13	0.64%
2008	1,139	57.44%	775	39.08%	69	3.48%
2012	1,174	60.55%	697	35.95%	68	3.51%
2016	1,505	77.74%	354	18.29%	77	3.98%
2020	1,606	80.18%	373	18.62%	24	1.20%
2024	1,588	81.65%	334	17.17%	23	1.18%

== Communities ==
=== Cities ===
- Downing
- Greentop (small part in Adair County)
- Lancaster (county seat)
- Queen City

=== Village ===
- Glenwood

=== Unincorporated community ===
- Clifton
- Coatsville
- Julesburg

=== Townships ===
The county was partitioned into seven townships. There are no townships with separate governing bodies in Schuyler County; instead, the county commission directly manages all unincorporated areas.

== Notable people ==
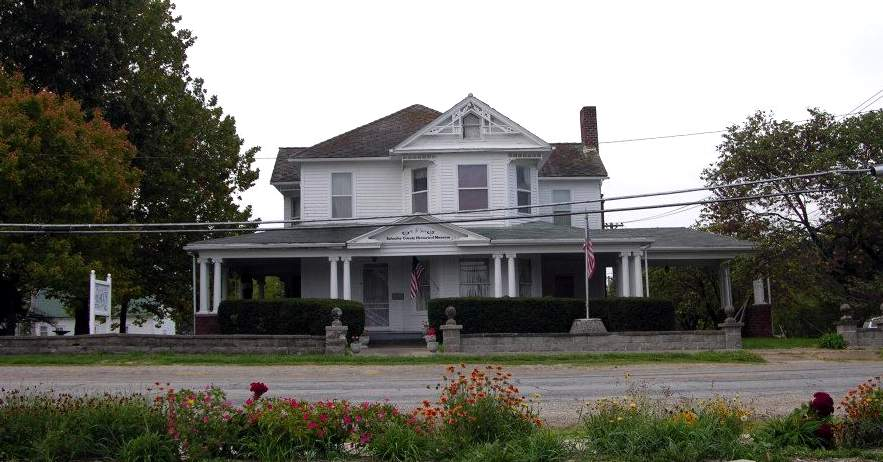
The former Lancaster home of William Preston Hall, now the Schuyler County Historical Society museum.

- Farrell Dobbs, American Trotskyist, trade unionist, and presidential candidate for the Socialist Workers Party.
- William Preston Hall (aka "The Colonel," "Diamond Billy," "Horse King of the World") (February 29, 1864 – June 29, 1932) Exotic animal dealer, horse and mule breeder, circus impresario.
- Howard R. Hughes Sr., co-founder of the Hughes Tool Company and father of Howard Robard Hughes Jr., the multimillionaire.
- Rupert Hughes, novelist and screenwriter, brother of Howard Hughes Sr. and uncle of Howard Hughes Jr.
- Darrin Vincent, bluegrass producer and Grammy-nominated performer (Kentucky Thunder, Dailey & Vincent)
- Rhonda Vincent, Award-winning Bluegrass performer.

== See also ==
- National Register of Historic Places listings in Schuyler County, Missouri
