= Illinois Central Railroad =

American railroad

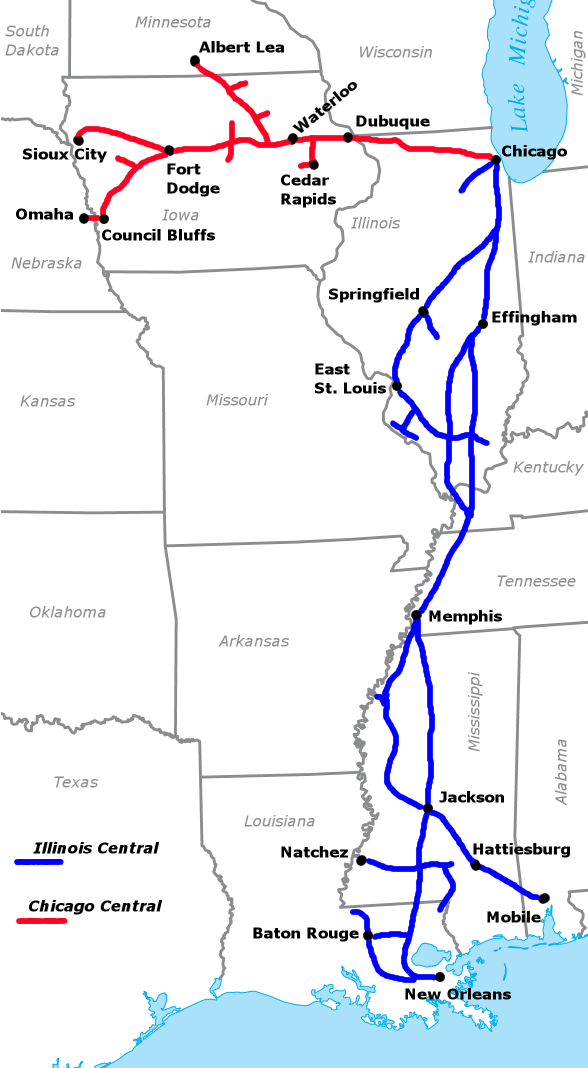
- Combined route map of the Chicago Central and Pacific (red) and Illinois Central (blue) railroads in 1996.

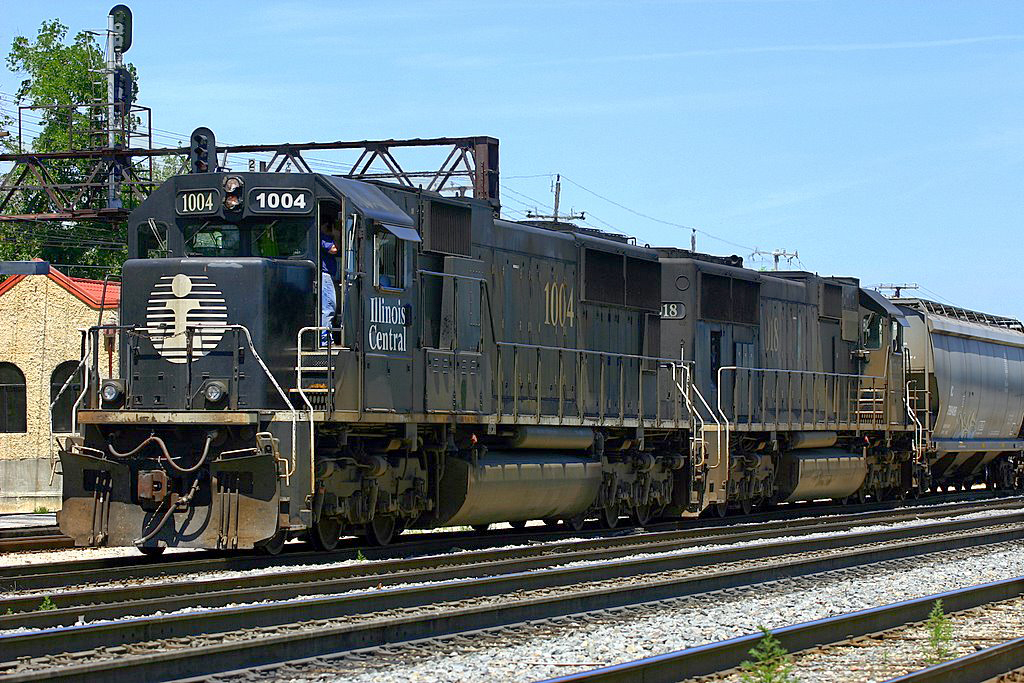
- Two Illinois Central EMD SD70s lead a train at Homewood, Illinois

Overview
- Headquarters: Chicago, Illinois
- Founders: Robert Rantoul Jr. Robert Schuyler; Jonathan Sturges
- Reporting mark: IC
- Locale: Midwest to Gulf Coast, United States
- Dates of operation: 1851–present (Remains a non-operational subsidiary.)
- Successor: Canadian National Railway

Technical
- Track gauge: 4 ft 8 1/2 in (1,435 mm) standard gauge
- Previous gauge: 5 ft (1,524 mm)
- Length: 3,130.21 mi (5,037.58 km)

The Illinois Central Railroad (reporting mark IC), sometimes called the Main Line of Mid-America, is a railroad in the Central United States that operated independently from 1851 to 1998 and is today owned and operated by the Canadian National Railway.

Its primary routes connect Chicago, Illinois, with New Orleans, Louisiana, and Mobile, Alabama, and thus, the Great Lakes to the Gulf of Mexico. A line built in 1870 connects Chicago west to Sioux City, Iowa, while smaller branches reached Sioux Falls, South Dakota, from Cherokee, Iowa, in 1877 and Omaha, Nebraska, from Fort Dodge, Iowa, in 1899. The IC also ran service to Miami, Florida, on tracks owned by other railroads.

The IC's construction was financed in part by a federal land grant, pioneering a method used by several other long-distance U.S. railroads. In 1998, the Canadian National Railway, via Grand Trunk Corporation, acquired control of the IC, and absorbed its operations the following year. The Illinois Central Railroad maintains its corporate existence as a non-operating subsidiary.

In 1971, Steve Goodman released a folk anthem, "City of New Orleans" about riding on Illinois Central's "Monday-morning rail" train and the passing of the "magic carpet" ride of passenger rail service in the United States, which once dominated travel.

== History ==
=== The first land grant railroad ===
The IC was one of the oldest Class I railroads in the United States. The company was incorporated by the Illinois General Assembly on January 16, 1836. Within a few months Rep. Zadok Casey (D-Illinois) introduced a bill in the U.S. House of Representatives authorizing a land grant to the company to construct a line from the mouth of the Ohio River to Chicago and on to Galena. Federal support, however, was not approved until 1850, when U.S. President Millard Fillmore signed a land grant for the construction of the railroad. The Illinois Central was the first land-grant railroad in the United States.

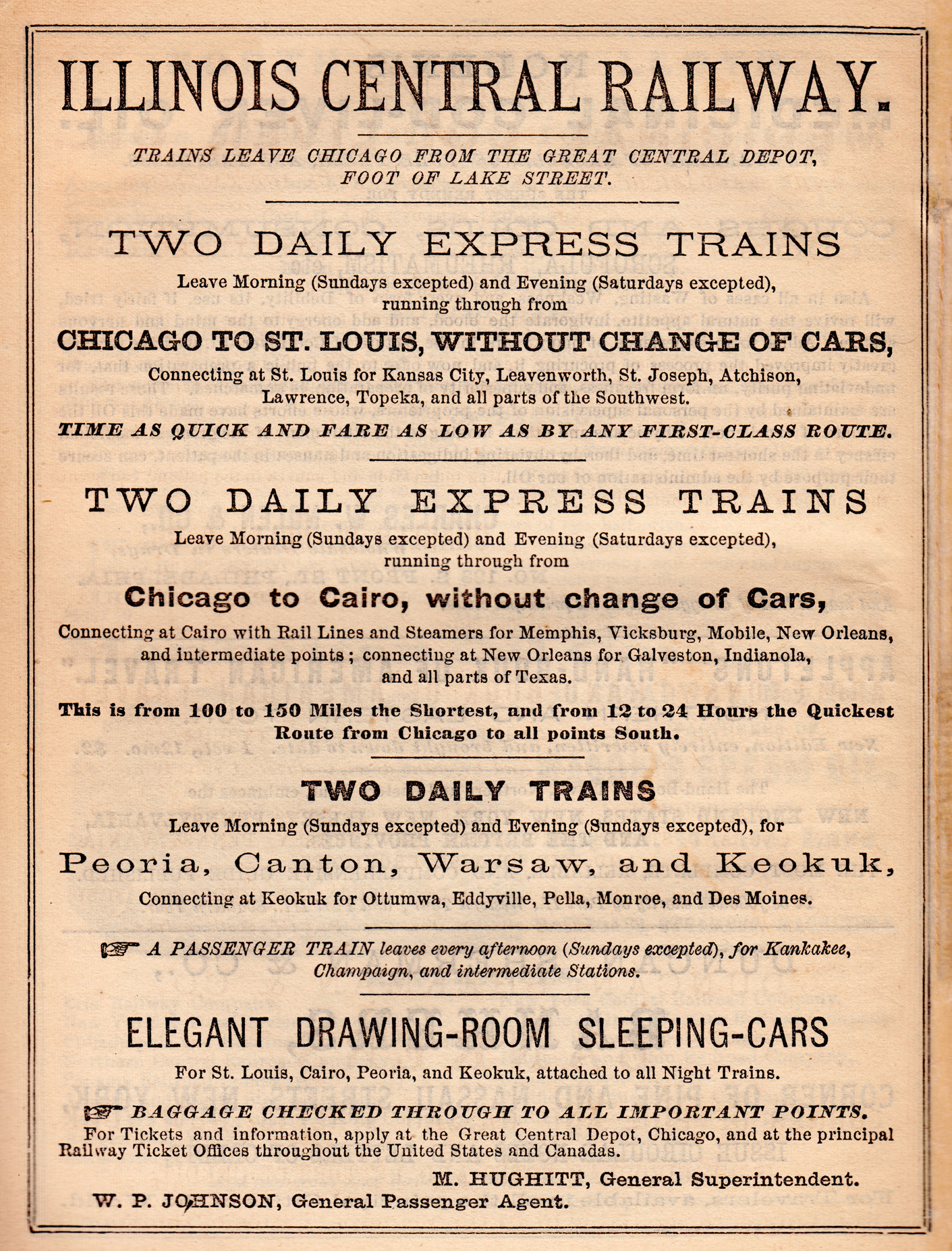
Illinois Central ad (1870)

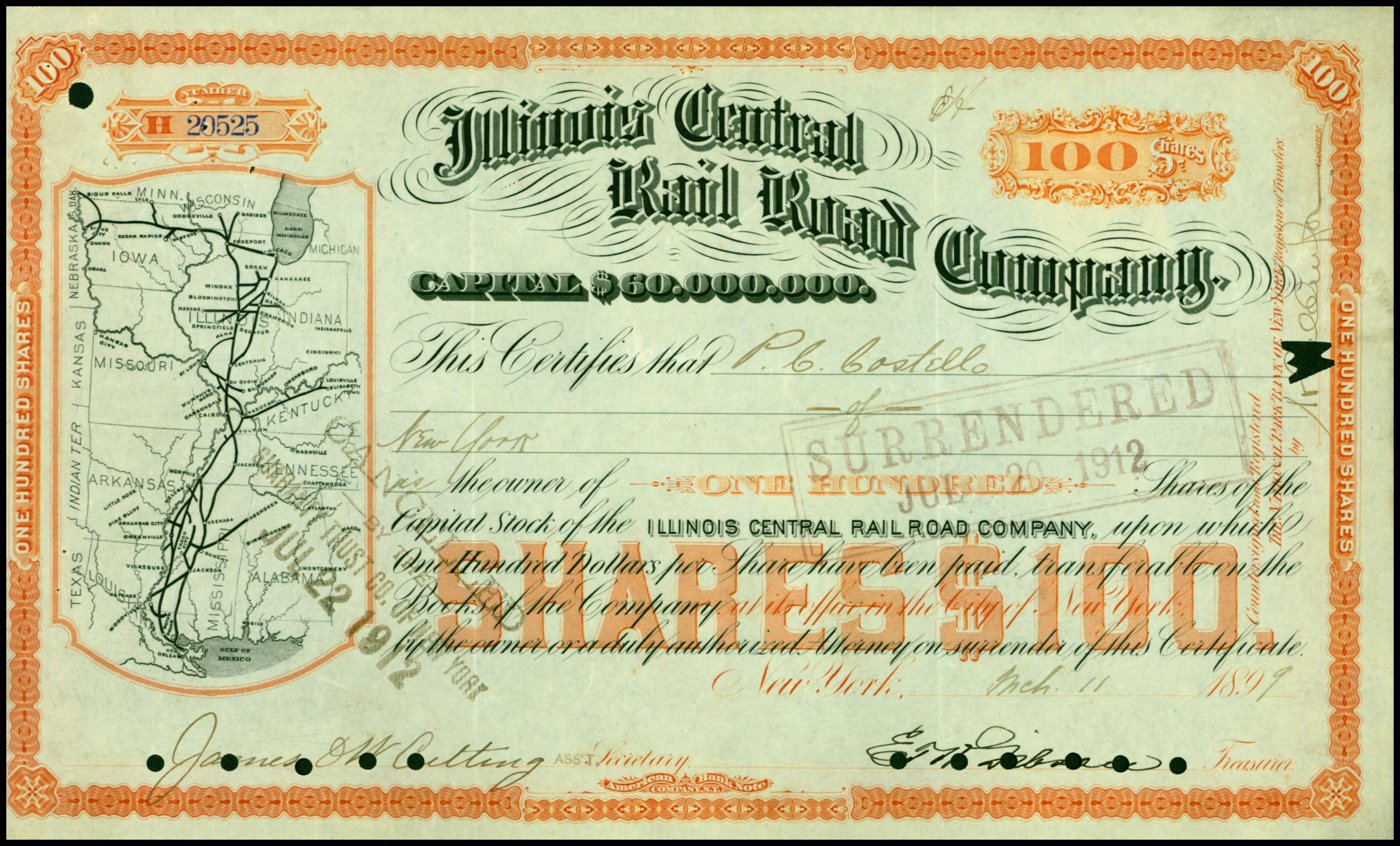
Illinois Central Rail Road share, issued 1899

The Illinois Central was chartered by the Illinois General Assembly on February 10, 1851. Senator Stephen A. Douglas and later President Abraham Lincoln were both Illinois Central men who lobbied for it. Douglas owned land near the terminal in Chicago. Lincoln was a lawyer for the railroad. Illinois legislators appointed Samuel D. Lockwood, recently retired from the Illinois Supreme Court (who may have given both lawyers the oral examination before admitting them to the Illinois bar), as a trustee on the new railroad's board to guard the public's interest. Lockwood, who would serve more than two decades until his death, had overseen federal land monies shortly after Illinois' statehood, then helped oversee early construction of the recently completed Illinois and Michigan Canal.

=== Early operations ===
Upon its completion in 1856, the IC was the longest railroad in the world. Its main line went from Cairo, Illinois, at the southern tip of the state, to Galena, in the northwest corner. A branch line went from Centralia (named for the railroad), to the rapidly growing city of Chicago. In Chicago, its tracks were laid along the shore of Lake Michigan and on an offshore causeway downtown, but land-filling and natural deposition have moved the present-day shore to the east. Track from Centralia north to Freeport would be abandoned in the 1980s, as traffic to Galena was routed via Chicago. During the Civil War Chicago became the supply base for the Western armies. General Ulysses S Grant took his forces on the Illinois Central—his supply line—down to Cairo. He then marched south to seize control of Kentucky and Tennessee on his way to victories at Shiloh, Vicksburg, and Chattanooga. For the entire war, the Illinois Central carried 626,000 soldiers back and forth for a total of 128,000,000 passenger miles of military service, for which the War Department paid $1.7 million, plus another $.5 million to move freight.

In 1867, the Illinois Central extended its track into Iowa. During the 1870s and 1880s, the IC acquired and expanded railroads in the southern United States. IC lines crisscrossed the state of Mississippi and went as far south as New Orleans, Louisiana, and east to Louisville, Kentucky. In the 1880s, northern lines were built to Dodgeville, Wisconsin; Sioux Falls, South Dakota; and Omaha, Nebraska. Further expansion continued into the early twentieth century.

The Illinois Central, and the other "Harriman lines" owned by E.H. Harriman by the twentieth century, became the target of the Illinois Central shopmen's strike of 1911. Although marked by violence and sabotage in the southern, midwestern, and western states, the strike was effectively over in a few months. The railroads simply hired replacements, among them African-American strikebreakers, and withstood diminishing union pressure. The strike was eventually called off in 1915.

Revenue freight ton-miles (millions)
	IC (incl Y&MV, G&SI)	Vicksburg, Shreveport, & Pacific	Alabama & Vicksburg
1925	15,050	239	159
1933	7,776	(into Y&MV)	(into Y&MV)
1944	24,012		
1960	17,171		
1970	22,902		

Revenue passenger-miles (millions)
	IC (incl Y&MV, G&SI)	Vicksburg Shreveport & Pacific	Alabama & Vicksburg
1925	982	22	20
1933	547	(into Y&MV)	(into Y&MV)
1944	2225		
1960	848		
1970	764		

The totals above do not include the Waterloo RR, Batesville Southwestern, Peabody Short Line or CofG and its subsidiaries. On December 31, 1925, IC/Y&MV/G&SI operated 6,562 route-miles on 11,030 miles of track; A&V and VS&P added 330 route-miles and 491 track-miles. At the end of 1970, IC operated 6,761 miles of road and 11,159 of track.

In 1960, the railroad retired its last steam locomotive, 2-8-2 Mikado #1518. On August 31, 1962, the railroad was incorporated as Illinois Central Industries, Inc. ICI acquired Abex Corporation (formerly American Brake Shoe and Foundry Co.) in 1968.

=== Illinois Central Gulf Railroad (1972–1988) ===
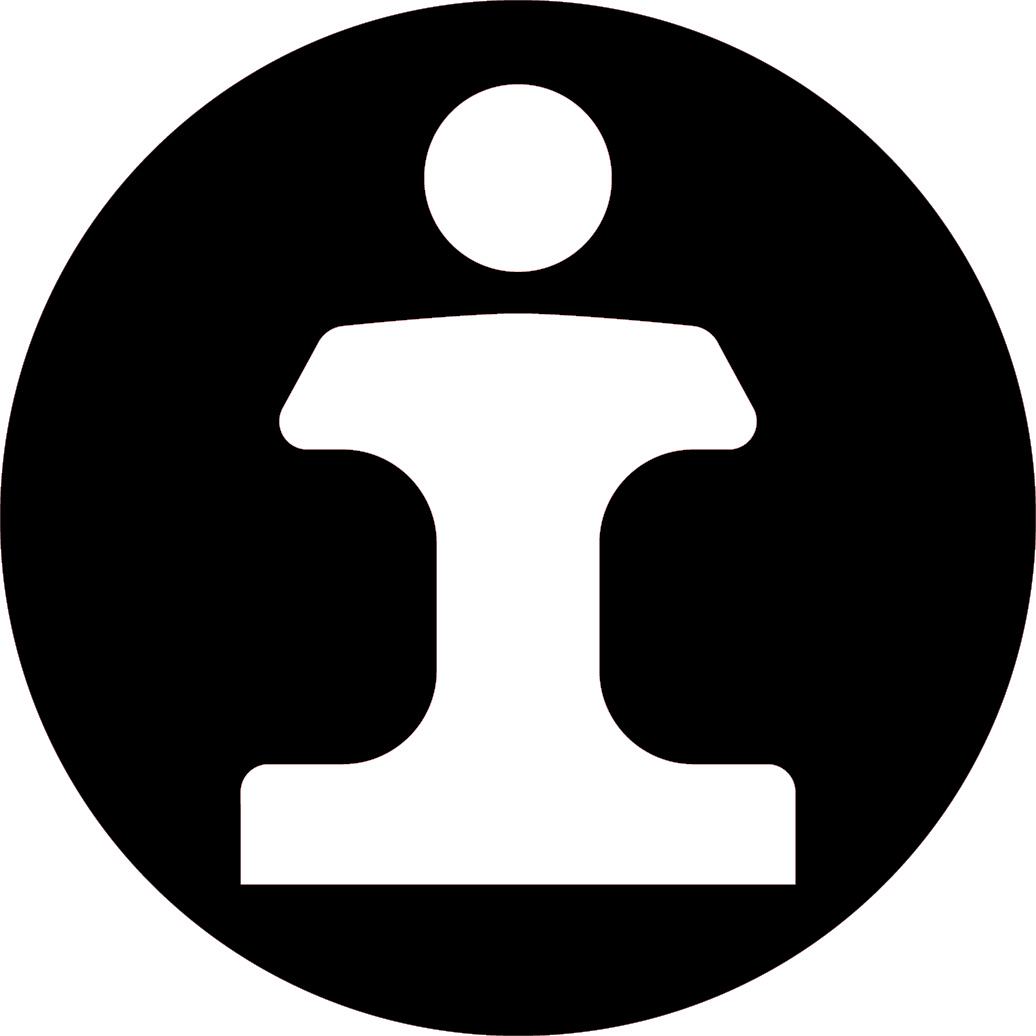
Illinois Central Gulf Railroad Logo

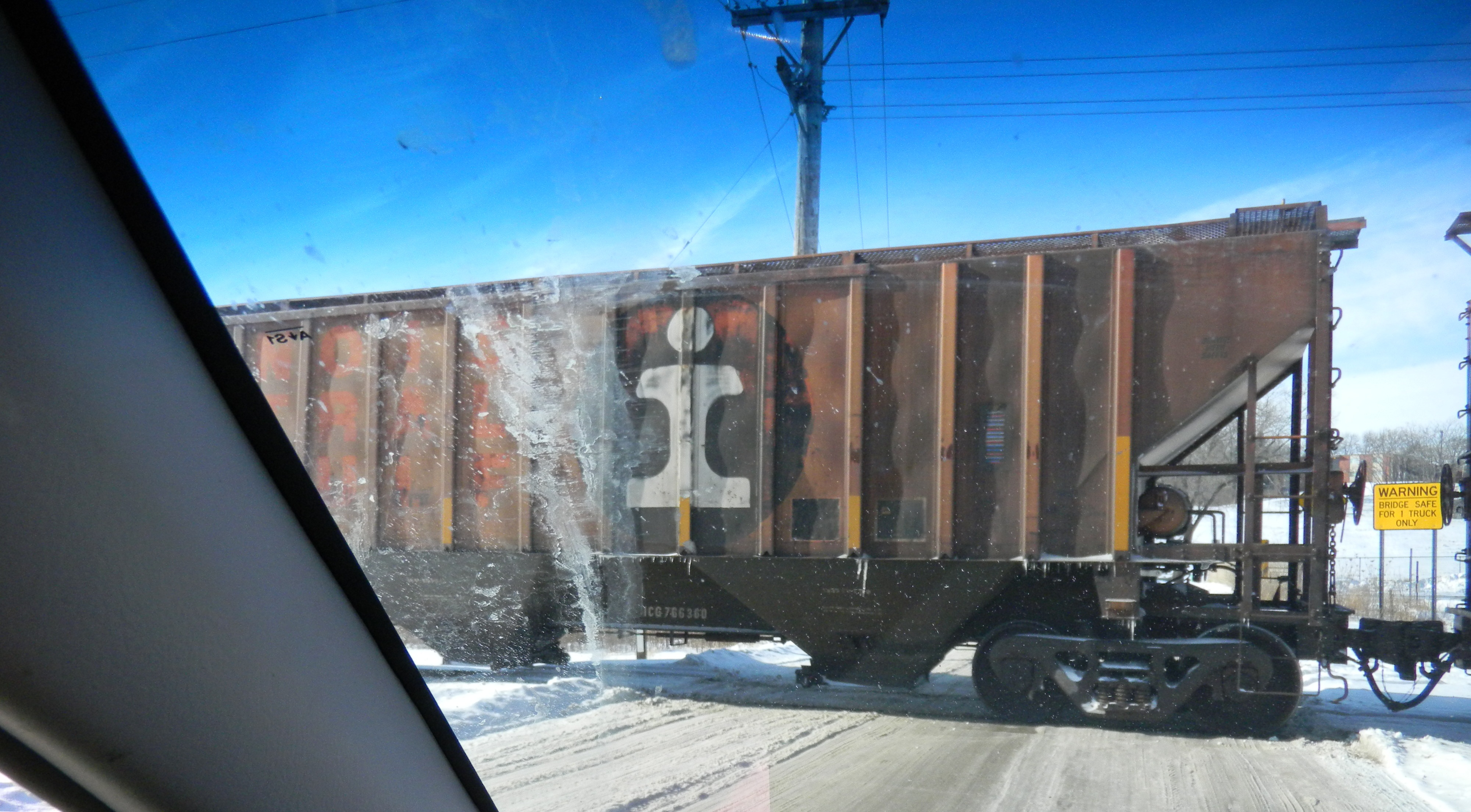
ICG hopper with ACI plate

On August 10, 1972, the Illinois Central Railroad merged with the Gulf, Mobile and Ohio Railroad to form the Illinois Central Gulf Railroad (reporting mark ICG). October 30 of that year saw the Illinois Central Gulf commuter rail crash, the company's deadliest.

At the end of 1980, ICG operated 8,366 miles of railroad on 13,532 miles of track; that year it reported 33,276 million ton-miles of revenue freight and 323 million passenger-miles. Later in that decade, the railroad spun off most of its east–west lines and many of its redundant north–south lines, including much of the former GM&O. Most of these lines were bought by other railroads, including entirely new railroads such as the Chicago, Missouri and Western Railway; Paducah and Louisville Railway; Chicago Central and Pacific Railroad; and MidSouth Rail Corporation.

In 1988, the railroad's parent company, IC Industries, spun off its remaining rail assets and changed its name to Whitman Corporation. On February 29, 1988, the newly separated ICG dropped the "Gulf" from its name and again became the Illinois Central Railroad.

=== Canadian National Railway (1998–present) ===
On February 11, 1998, the IC was purchased for about $2.4 billion in cash and shares by Canadian National Railway (CN). Integration of operations began July 1, 1999.

In November 2020, as part of celebrations for the 25th anniversary of CN's privatization, the company unveiled a series of locomotives repainted in the schemes of the company's predecessor and subsidiary railroads. GE ET44AC No. 3008, which was repainted in the black livery of IC, along with the logos of that company.

== Locomotives ==
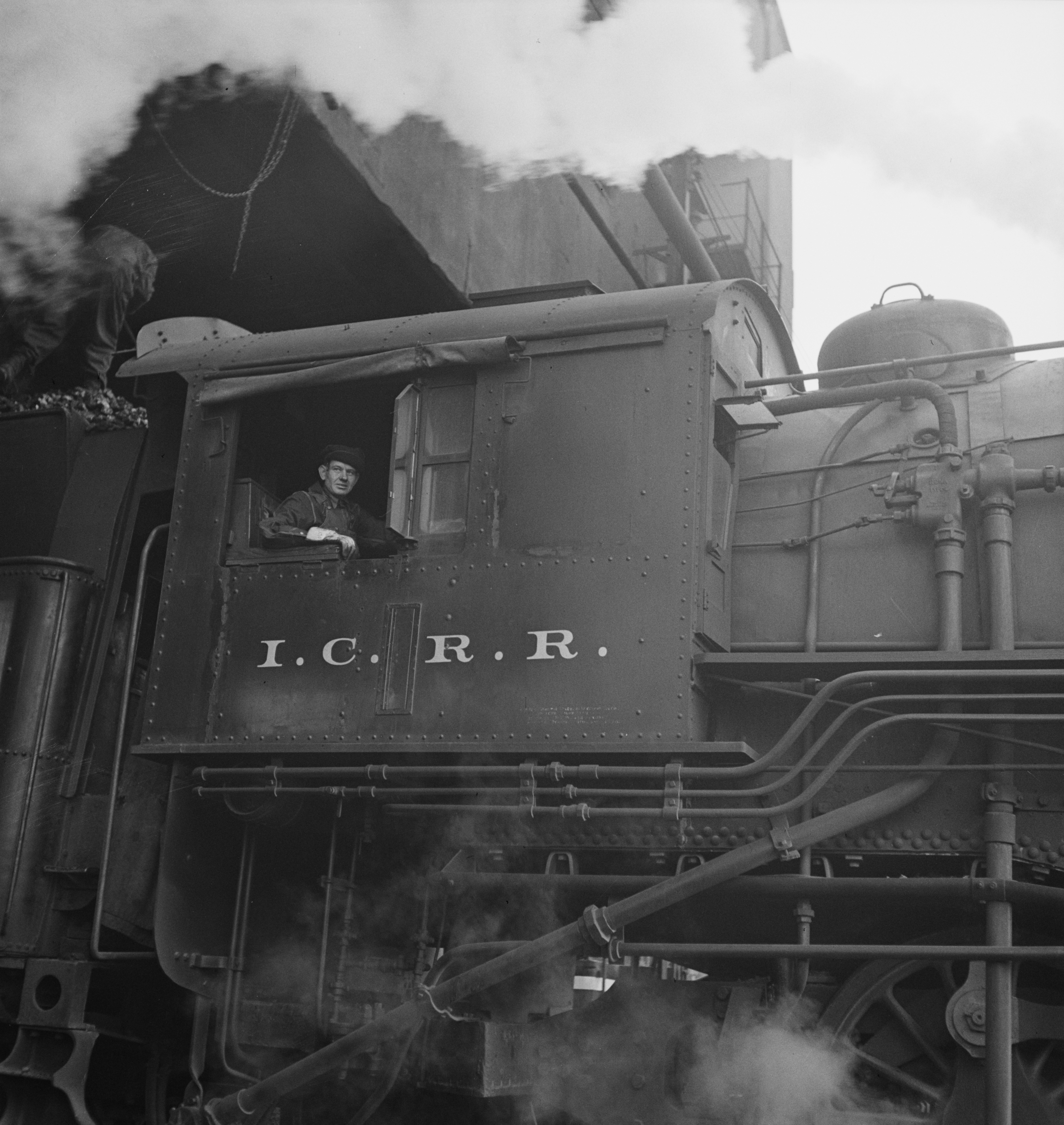
An IC steam locomotive taking on coal at a Chicago rail yard in November 1942

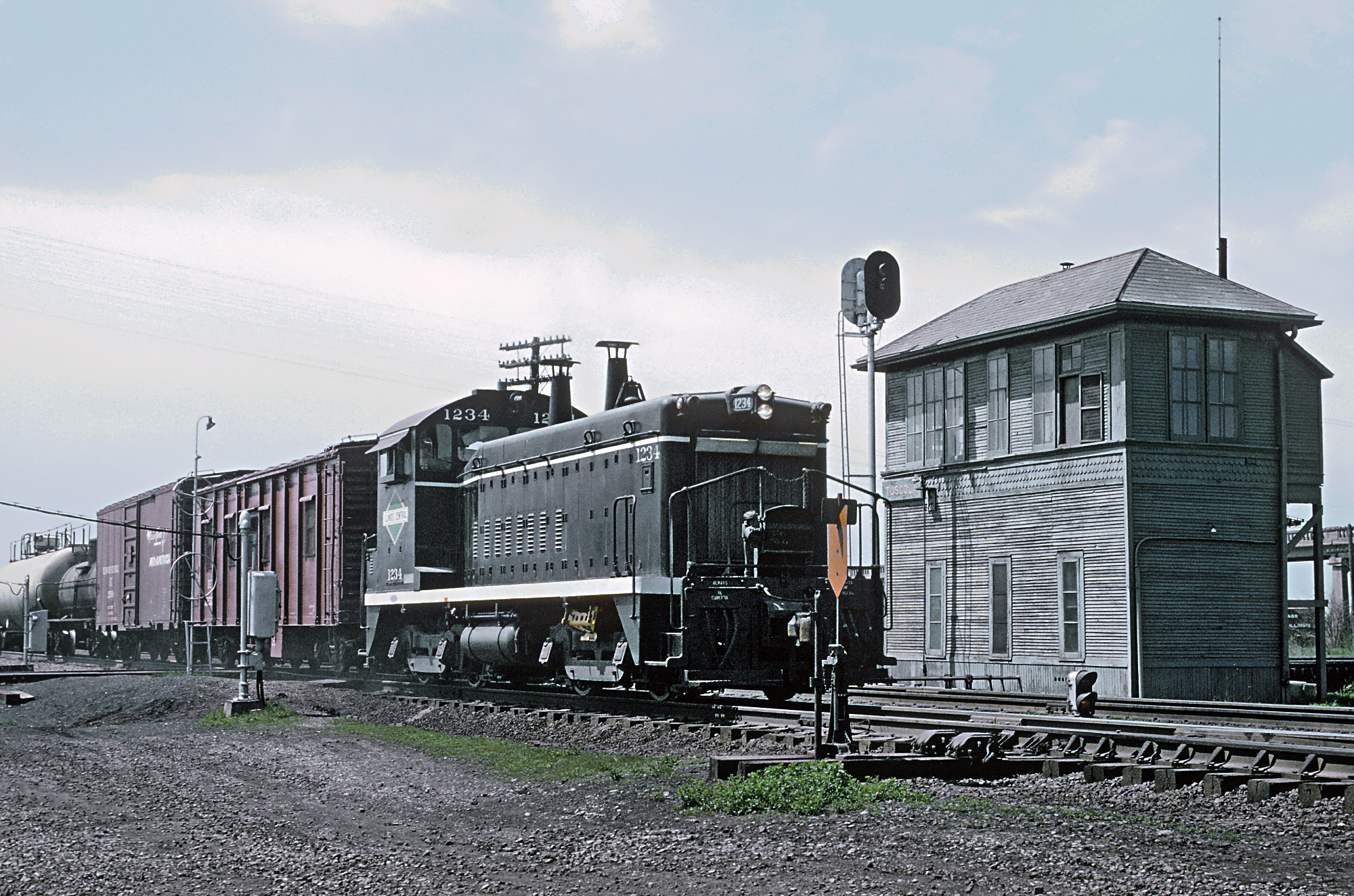
IC 1234, an EMD SW9, switching at Tuscola, Illinois in 1966

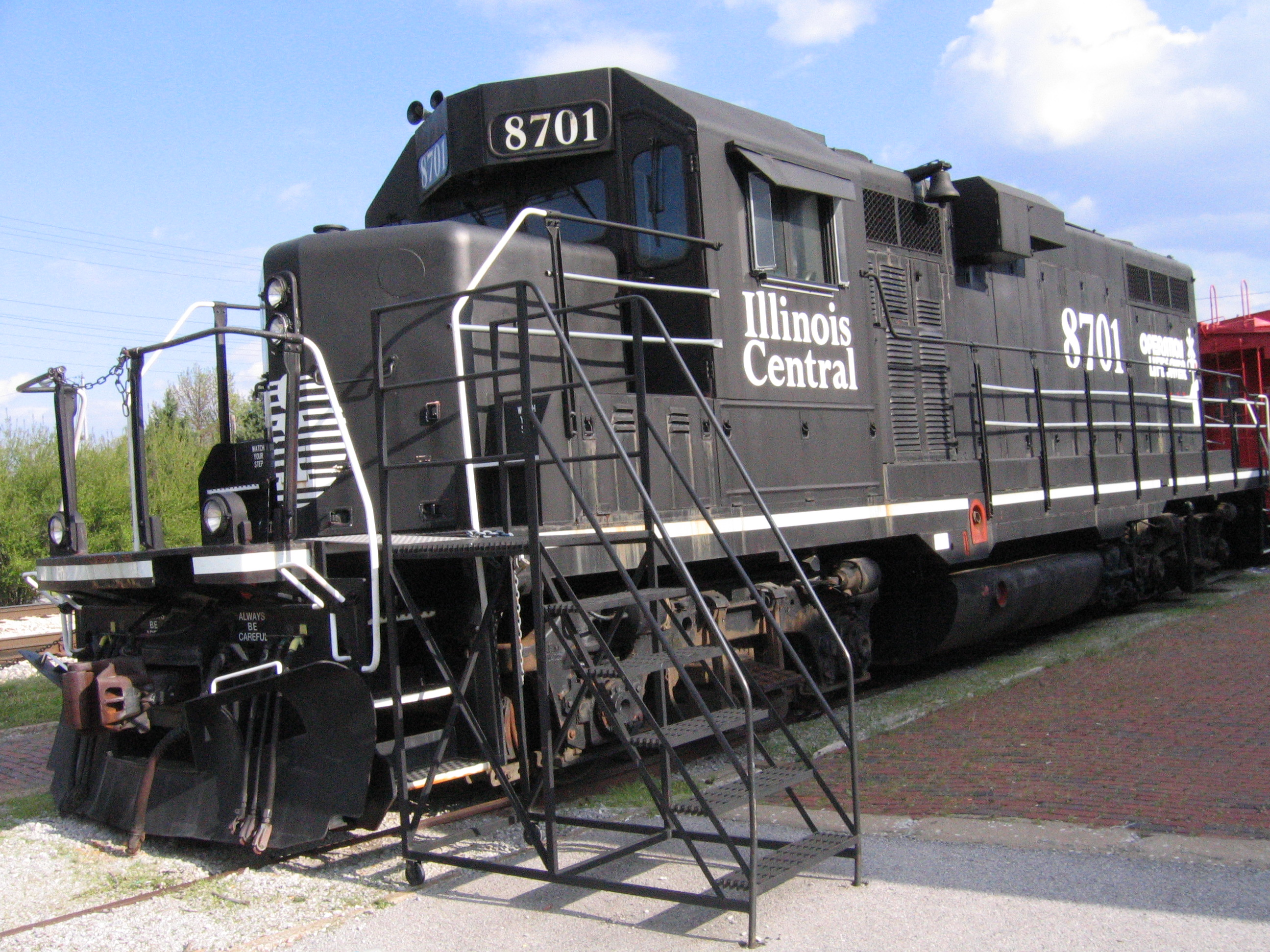
A preserved Illinois Central EMD GP11 locomotive on static display in downtown Carbondale, Illinois

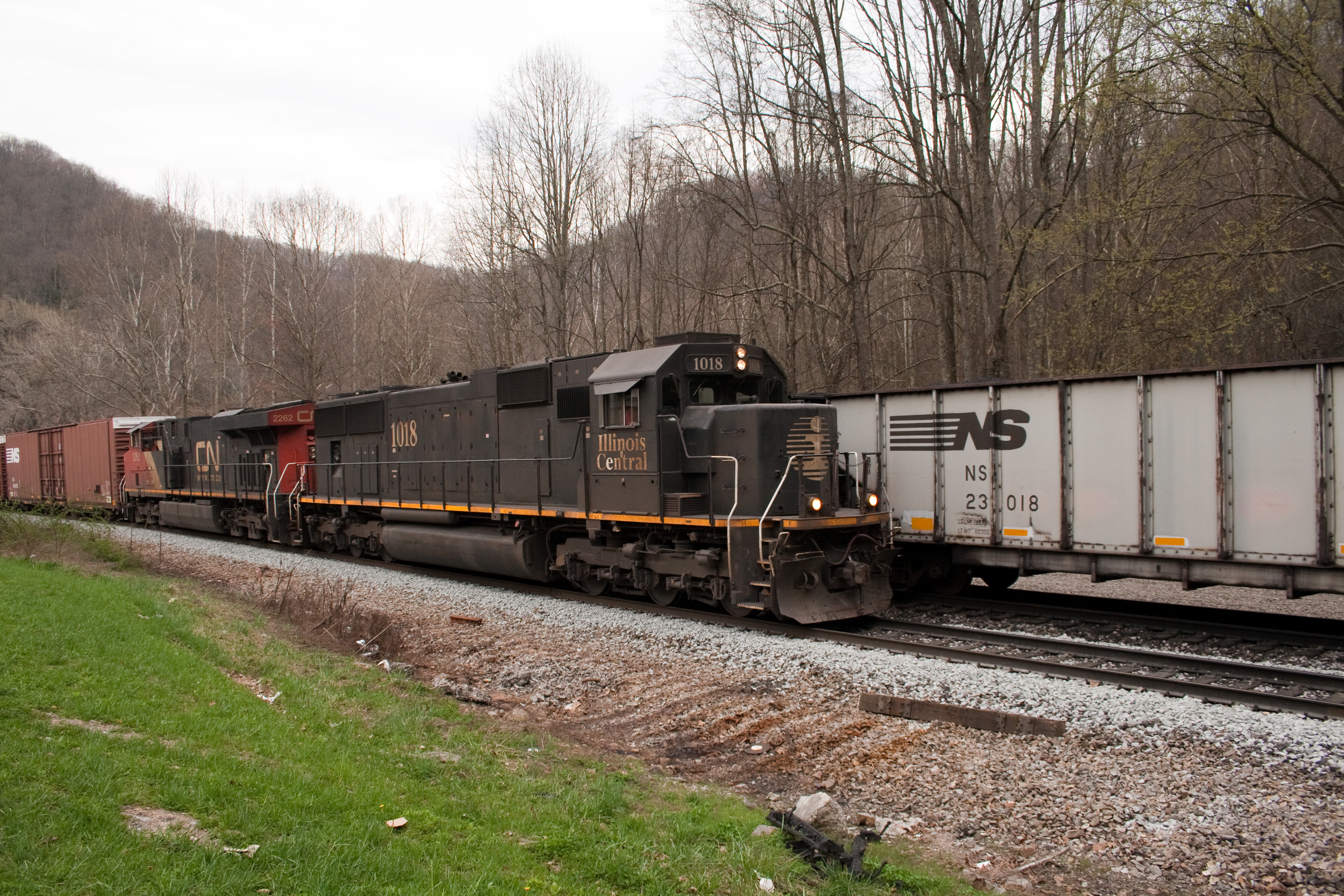
Illinois Central 1018, an EMD SD70, leads a Norfolk Southern mixed freight

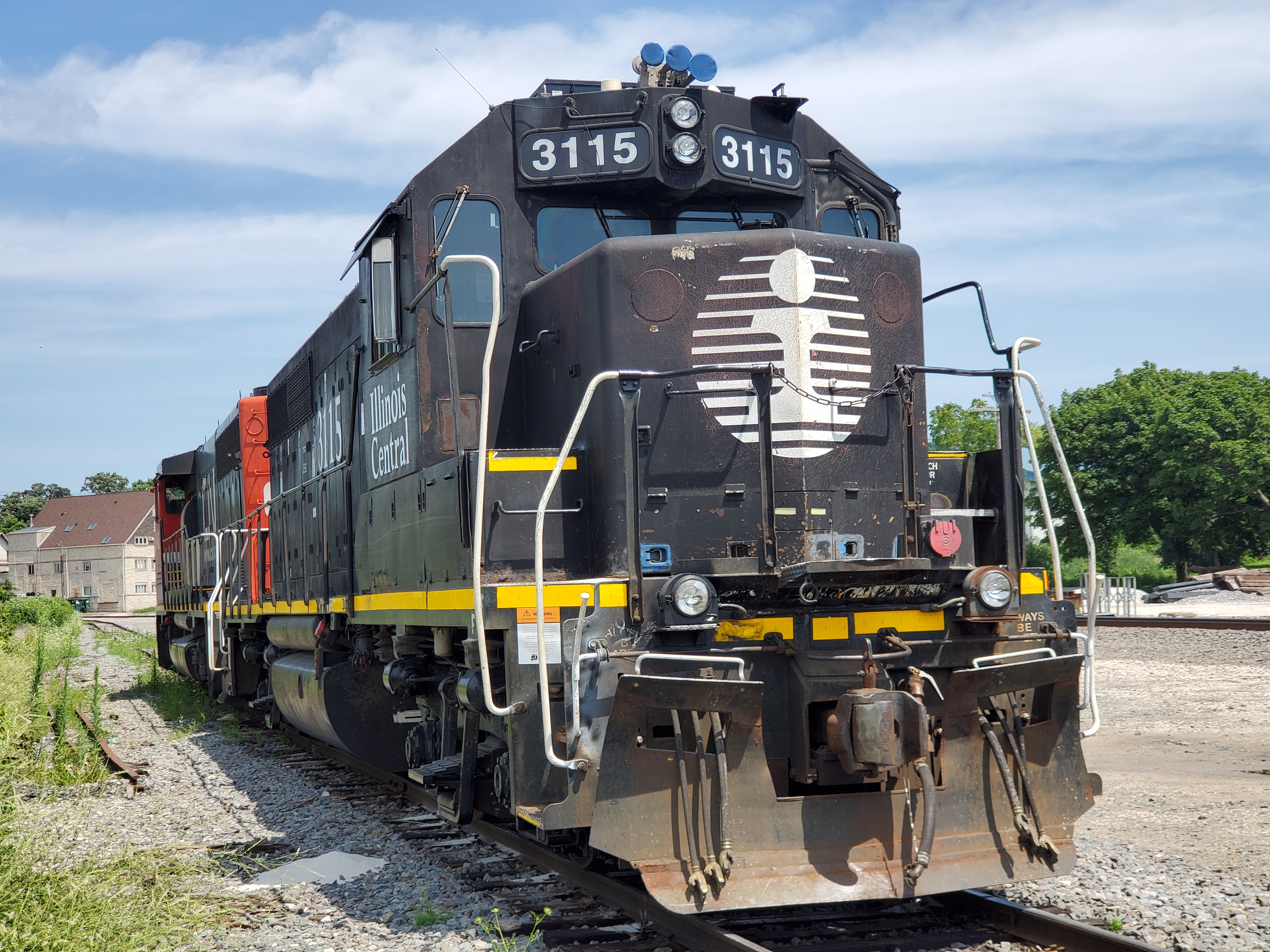
IC 3115, an EMD GP40R, sitting in Waukesha, Wisconsin

== Passenger train service ==
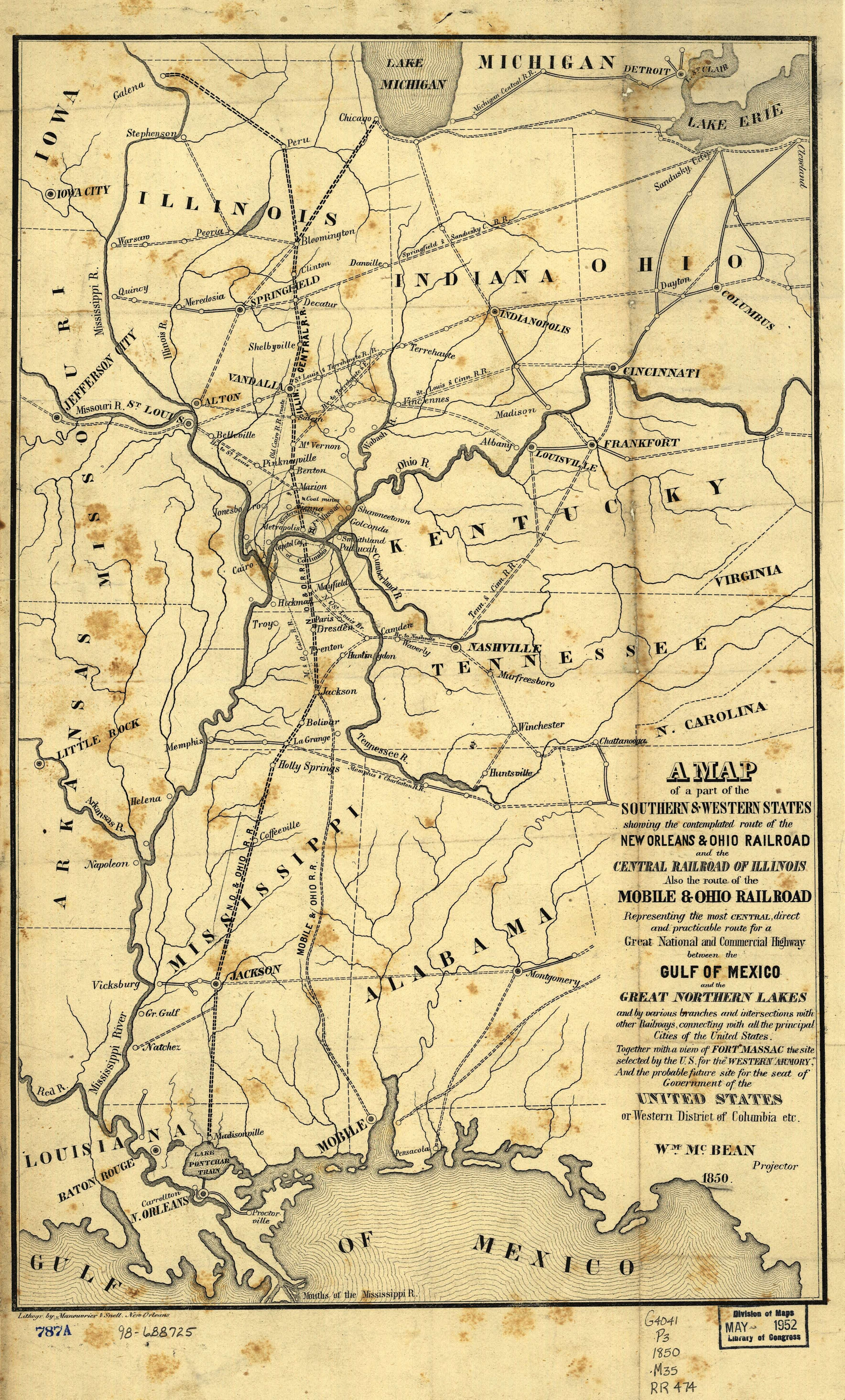
Illinois Central 1850 planned Route Map

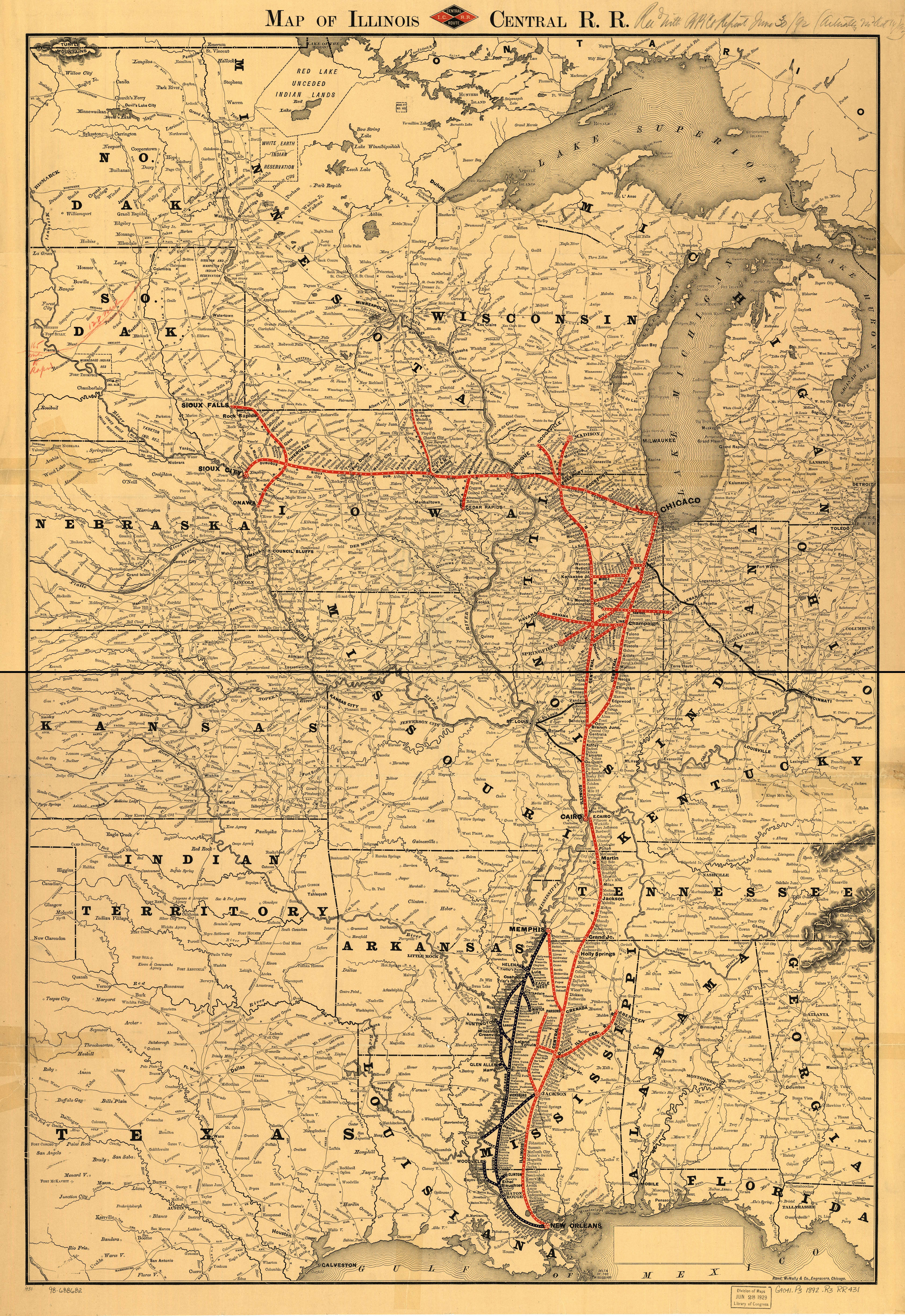
Illinois Central 1892 Route Map

Illinois Central was the major carrier of passengers on its Chicago-to-New Orleans mainline and between Chicago and St. Louis. IC also ran passengers on its Chicago-to-Omaha line, though it was never among the top performers on this route. Illinois Central's largest passenger terminal, Central Station, stood at 12th Street east of Michigan Avenue in Chicago. Due to the railroad's north–south route from the Gulf of Mexico to the Great Lakes, Illinois Central passenger trains were one means of transport during the African American Great Migration of the 1920s.

Illinois Central's most famous train was the Panama Limited, a premier all-Pullman car service between Chicago and New Orleans, with a section breaking off at Carbondale to serve St. Louis. In 1949, it added a daytime all-coach companion, the City of New Orleans, which operated with a St. Louis section breaking off at Carbondale and a Louisville section breaking off at Fulton, Kentucky. In 1967, due to losses incurred by the operation of the train, the Illinois Central combined the Panama Limited with a coach-only train called the Magnolia Star.

On May 1, 1971, Amtrak took over intercity rail service. It retained service over the IC mainline, but dropped the Panama Limited in favor of the City of New Orleans. However, since it did not connect with any other trains in either New Orleans or Chicago, Amtrak moved the route to an overnight schedule and brought back the Panama Limited name. However, it restored the City of New Orleans name in 1981, while retaining the overnight schedule. This was to capitalize on the popularity of a song about the train, called City of New Orleans (song) written by Steve Goodman and performed by Arlo Guthrie. Willie Nelson's recording of the song was #1 on the Hot Country Charts in 1984.

Illinois Central ran several other trains along the main route including The Creole and The Louisiane.

The Green Diamond was the Illinois Central's premier train between Chicago, Springfield and St. Louis. Other important trains included the Hawkeye which ran daily between Chicago and Sioux City and the City of Miami eventually running every other day between Chicago and Miami via the Atlantic Coast Line, the Central of Georgia Railroad and Florida East Coast Railway.

The Illinois Central was also a major operator of commuter trains in the Chicago area, operating what eventually became the "IC Electric" line from Randolph Street Terminal in downtown Chicago to the southeast suburbs. In 1987, IC sold this line to Metra, who operates it as the Metra Electric District. It still operates out of what is now Millennium Station, which is still called "Randolph Street Terminal" by many longtime Chicago-area residents. In honor of the Panama Limited, the Electric District appears as "Panama Orange" on Metra system maps and timetables. Additionally, the IC operated a second commuter line out of Chicago (the West Line) which served Chicago's western suburbs. Unlike the electrified commuter service, the West Line did not generate much traffic and was eliminated in 1931.

Amtrak presently runs three trains daily over this route, the City of New Orleans and the Illini and Saluki between Chicago and Carbondale. Another Illinois corridor service is planned for the former Black Hawk route between Chicago, Rockford and Dubuque. Amtrak, at the state of Illinois' request, did a feasibility study to reinstate the Black Hawk route to Rockford and Dubuque. Initial capital costs range from $32 million to $55 million, depending on the route. Once in operation, the service would require roughly $5 million a year in subsidies from the state.

On December 10, 2010, IDOT announced the route choice for the resumption of service to begin in 2014 going over mostly CN railway.

=== Illinois Central named trains ===
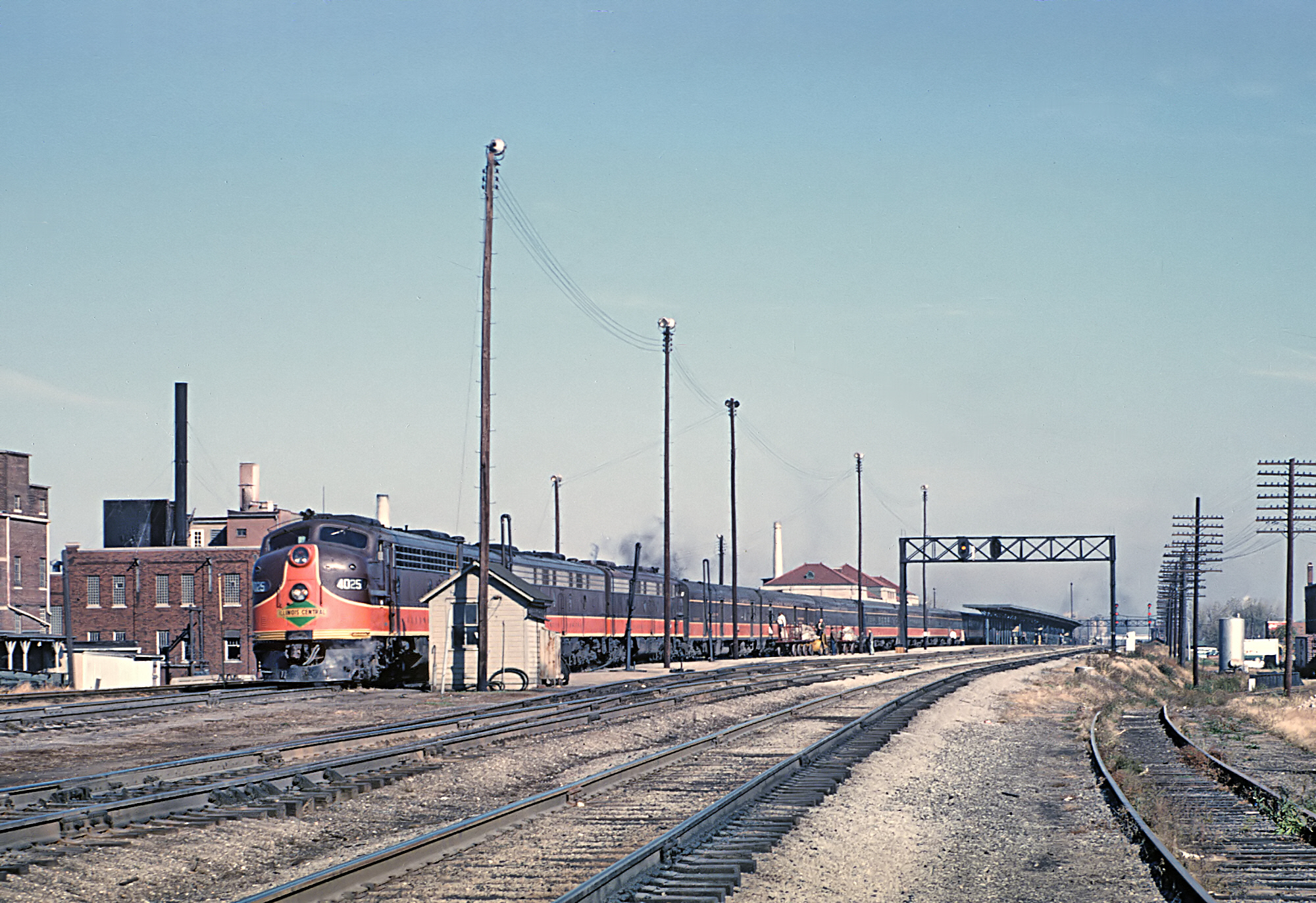
The City of New Orleans at Champaign, IL station on October 27, 1962.

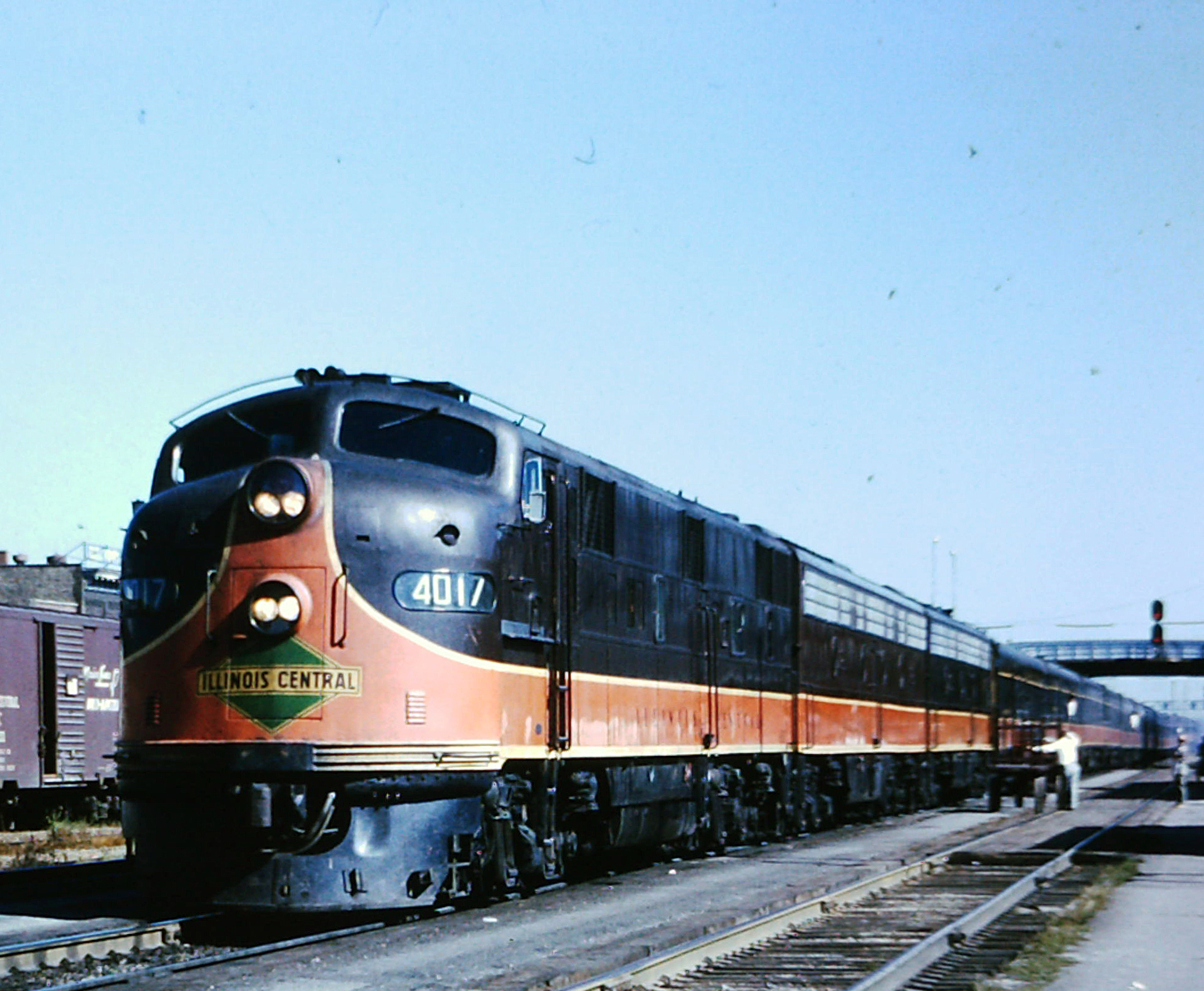
IC's City of New Orleans at Kankakee, Illinois in 1964

Train	Northern Terminus	Southern Terminus
Cannonball Express or Illinois Central Fast Mail	Chicago	New Orleans
Chickasaw	St. Louis	New Orleans
City of Miami	Chicago	Miami
City of New Orleans	Chicago	New Orleans
Creole	Chicago, Louisville and St. Louis	New Orleans
Daylight	Chicago	St. Louis
Delta Express	Memphis, Tennessee	Greenville, Mississippi
Floridan	Chicago and St. Louis	Miami
Green Diamond	Chicago	St. Louis
Governor's Special	Chicago	Springfield, Illinois
Hawkeye	Chicago	Sioux City, Iowa/Sioux Falls, South Dakota
Illini	Chicago	Carbondale, Illinois
Iowan	Chicago	Sioux City, Iowa
Irvin S. Cobb	Louisville, Kentucky	Memphis, Tennessee
Kentucky Cardinal	Louisville, Kentucky	Memphis, Tennessee
Land O'Corn	Chicago	Waterloo, Iowa
Louisiane	Chicago and Louisville	New Orleans
Magnolia Star	Chicago	New Orleans
Mid-American	Chicago	St. Louis/Memphis, Tennessee
Miss Lou	Jackson, Mississippi	New Orleans
Night Diamond	Chicago	St. Louis
Northern Express	Chicago	New Orleans
Northeastern Limited	Shreveport, Louisiana	Meridian, Mississippi with continuing sleepers to New York City on the Southern Railway's Pelican
Panama Limited	Chicago	New Orleans
Planter	Memphis, Tennessee	New Orleans
Seminole	Chicago and St. Louis	Jacksonville, Florida
Shawnee	Chicago	Carbondale, Illinois
Sinnissippi	Chicago	Freeport, Iowa
Southern Express	Chicago	New Orleans
Southwestern Limited	Meridian, Mississippi with continuing sleepers from New York City on the Southern Railway's Pelican	Shreveport, Louisiana
Sunchaser (winter only)	Chicago and St. Louis	Miami, Florida

== Company officers ==
Presidents of the Illinois Central Railroad have included:

- Sidney Breese, Father of the Illinois Central Railroad
- Robert Schuyler, 1851–1853
- William P. Burrall, 1853–1854
- John N. A. Griswold, 1855
- William H. Osborn, 1855–1865
- John M. Douglas, 1865–1871, 1875–1876
- John Newell, 1871–1874
- Wilson G. Hunt, 1874–1875
- William K. Ackerman, 1876–1883
- James C. Clarke, 1883–1887
- Stuyvesant Fish, 1887–1906
- James Theodore Harahan, 1906–1911
- Charles H. Markham, 1911–1918
- Charles A. Peabody, 1918–1919
- Charles H. Markham, 1919–1926
- Lawrence A. Downs, 1926–1938
- John L. Beven, 1938–1945
- Wayne A. Johnston, 1945–1966 (chairman of Illinois Central Industries to 1967)
- William B. Johnson, 1967–1969 (chairman of IC Industries to 1987)
- Alan Stephenson Boyd, 1969–1972
- William J Taylor, 1976–1983
- Harry J Bruce, 1983–1990
- Edward L. Moyers, 1990–1993
- E. Hunter Harrison, 1993–1998

== Preservation ==
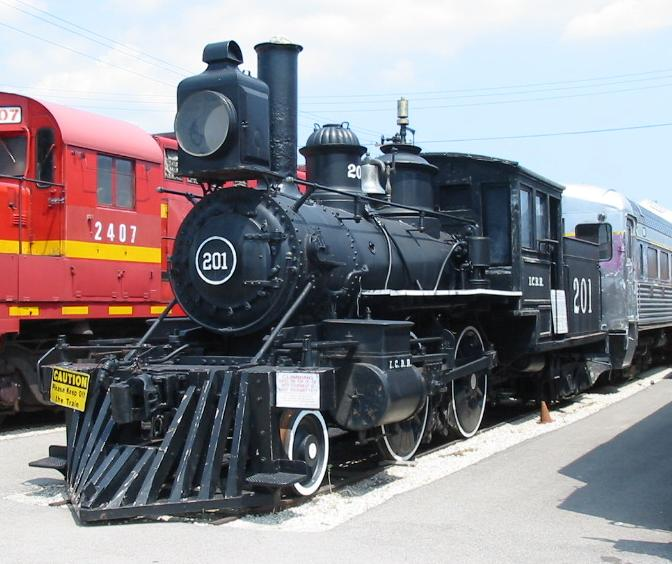
IC No. 201 on display at the Illinois Railway Museum

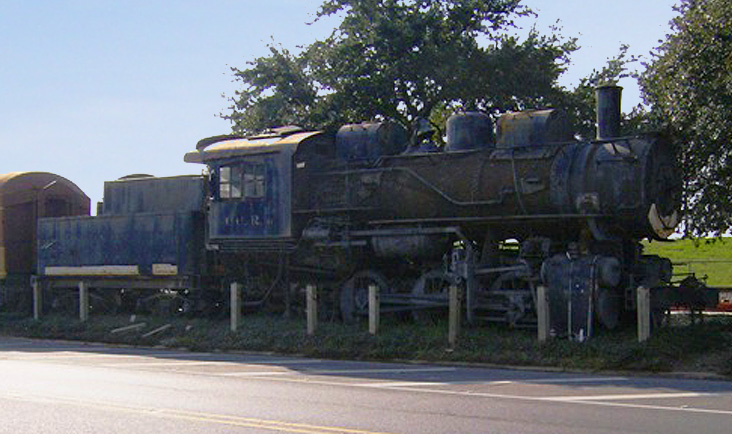
IC No. 333 on display at Yazoo and Mississippi Valley Railroad Company Depot

Several locomotives and rolling stock formerly owned and used by Illinois Central are preserved, and many of them reside in parks and museums across the United States.

- No. 201, a 2-4-4 suburban tank locomotive that participated in the "Wheels A-Rolling" pageant at the Chicago Railroad Fair, is displayed at Illinois Railway Museum in Union, Illinois.
- No. 268, an 0-6-0 switcher, resides in Laurel, Mississippi.
- No. 333, an 0-6-0 switcher, and several passenger cars are on display just outside the historic Yazoo and Mississippi Valley Railroad Company Depot in Baton Rouge, Louisiana.
- No. 764, a 651 class 2-8-0 "Consolidation", was donated to the National Museum of Transportation in St. Louis, Missouri, in 1956.
- No. 790 is on static display at Steamtown National Historic Site in Scranton, Pennsylvania.
- No. 1518, a 1500 series 2-8-2 "Mikado", is on static display in Paducah, Kentucky. It was built by the Lima Locomotive Works in 1923.
- No. 2500, the first of 2500 class 4-8-2 "Mountain" types, is on static display in the Age of Steam Memorial in Centralia, Illinois.
- No. 2542, a 2500 class 4-8-2, is on static display at McComb, Mississippi.
- No. 3525, an 0-8-0 switcher, is displayed at Tanglewood Park in Clemmons, North Carolina while painted as a Southern Railway locomotive & was renumbered to 1894.
- No. 3706, a 2-6-0 "Mogul", resides at the Illinois Railway Museum.
- A yard office and a coal-fueling tower remain at the Illinois Central yards in Council Bluffs, Iowa.
- IC No. 8408 GP10 locomotive/IC 9426 caboose static display Homewood, IL
- Illinois Central GP11 #8701, along with an IC caboose, preserved on static display at the Carbondale passenger station in Carbondale, Illinois.
- Illinois Central GP11 #8733 preserved at the Monticello Railway Museum in Monticello, Illinois.
- Several pieces of IC rolling stock also reside at the Monticello Railway Museum: IC combine No. 892, IC Day Coaches Nos. 2920, 2855, and 2612, IC Business Car No. 7, IC 10-6 sleeper Nos. 3531 "Council Bluffs", IC Dorm-baggage No. 1906, IC No. 518 (MAIL STORAGE), IC Panama Limited Observation "Gulfport", ICG cement hopper No. 100040, IC No. 65018, IC bridge crane No. X238, IC No. X1957 Boxcar, IC No. X2000 Idler Flat, IC's No. X4342 and X4352 tenders, IC X9151 Jordan Spreader, and IC cabooses Nos. 9926, 9831, and 9880.
- An Illinois Central caboose and banana car are preserved at the Casey Jones Railroad Museum in Water Valley, Mississippi.
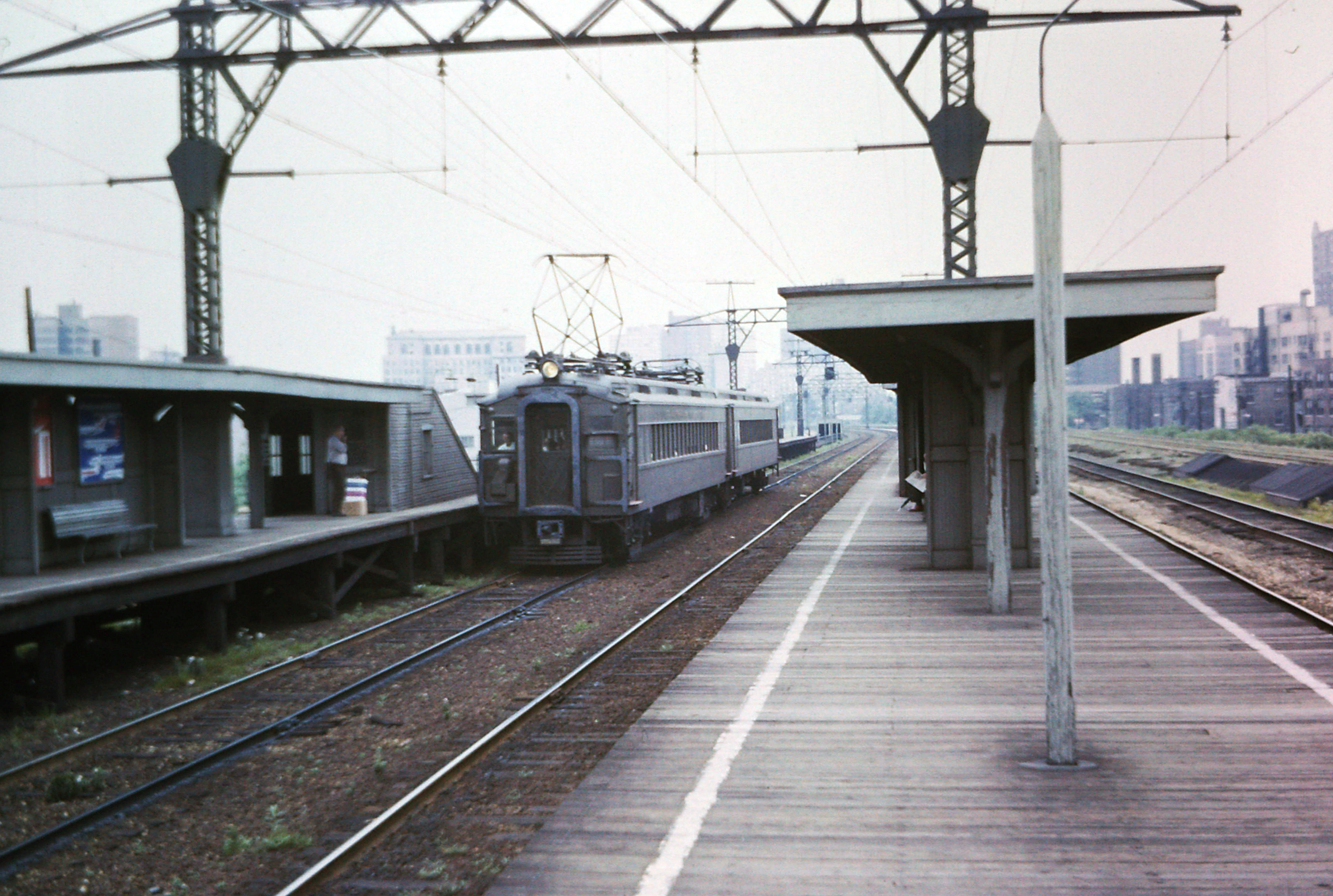
  Illinois Central "Wickerliner" in Chicago, Illinois, 1967
- An Illinois Central caboose is privately owned and preserved in Raymond, Mississippi at the old train depot in the center of the town.
- Illinois Central SD40X No. 6071 (Ex-Gulf, Mobile and Ohio) at the Monticello Railway Museum in Monticello, Illinois
- Illinois Central Gulf GP8 No. 7738 at the Bluegrass Railroad Museum in Versailles, Kentucky
- 1974 Illinois Central Gulf caboose (No. 199422) in service as IRM 9422 at the Indiana Railway Museum in French Lick, Indiana.
- Illinois Central caboose on historic main street in Palestine, Illinois.
- One Illinois Central Caboose resides in Grayville, Illinois.
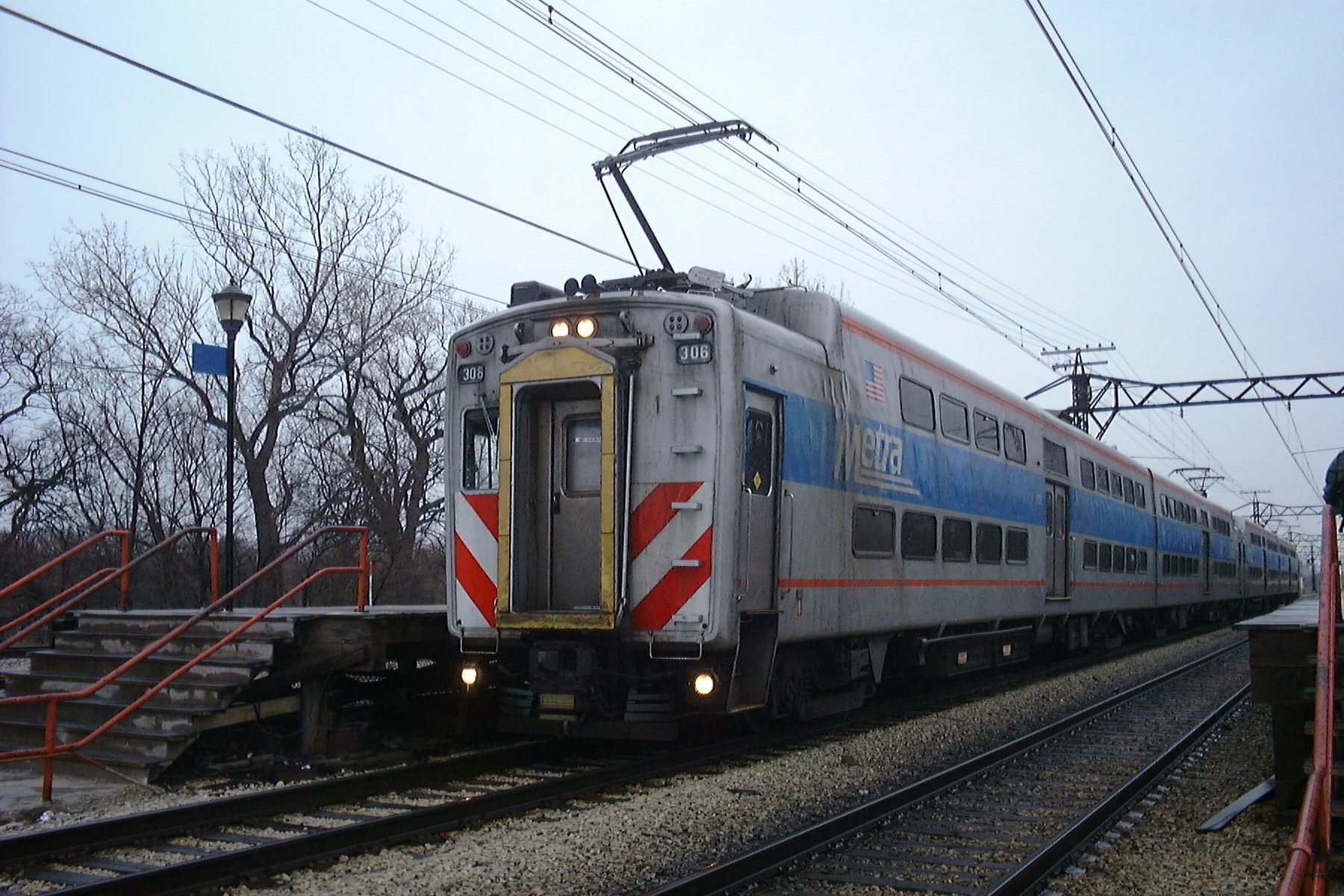
  Former Illinois Central "Highliner" built by Bombardier on the Metra Electric, 2002
- IC Nos. 1198 and 1380 "Wickerliner" (built by Pullman 1926) electric commuter cars at Illinois Railway Museum
- IC Nos. 1534 and 1630 "Highliner" (built by St Louis 1971–1972) electric commuter cars at Illinois Railway Museum (these cars were renamed "Highliner I" in 2005 well into their Metra Electric when Metra ordered the all-new "Highliner II")
- IC Nos. 1637 and 1645 "Highliner" (built by Bombardier 1978–1979) electric commuter cars at Illinois Railway Museum (these cars were renamed "Highliner I" in 2005 well into their Metra Electric when Metra ordered the all-new "Highliner II")

== Mississippi Central (1852–1878) ==
The original Mississippi Central line was chartered in 1852. Construction of the 255 miles (410 km) 5 ft (1,524 mm) gauge line began in 1853 and was completed in 1860, just prior to the Civil War, from Canton, Mississippi to Jackson, Tennessee. The southern terminus of the line connected to the New Orleans, Jackson and Great Northern Railroad at Canton. It also connected to the Memphis and Charleston Railroad at Grand Junction, Tennessee and the Mobile and Ohio Railroad at Jackson, Tennessee. The Mississippi Central was the scene of several military actions from 1862 to 1863 and was severely damaged during the fighting. Company president, Absolom M. West succeeded in repairing the damage and returning it to operating condition soon after the end of the War.

By 1874, interchange traffic with the Illinois Central Railroad was important enough that the IC installed a Nutter hoist at Cairo, Illinois to interchange between its standard gauge equipment broad gauge used by the Mississippi Central. This allowed the trucks to be exchanged on 16-18 freight cars per hour; a Pullman car could be changed in 15 minutes. The original Mississippi Central line was merged into the Illinois Central Railroad subsidiary Chicago, St. Louis and New Orleans Railroad in several transactions finally completed in 1878.

== Mississippi Central (1897–1967) ==
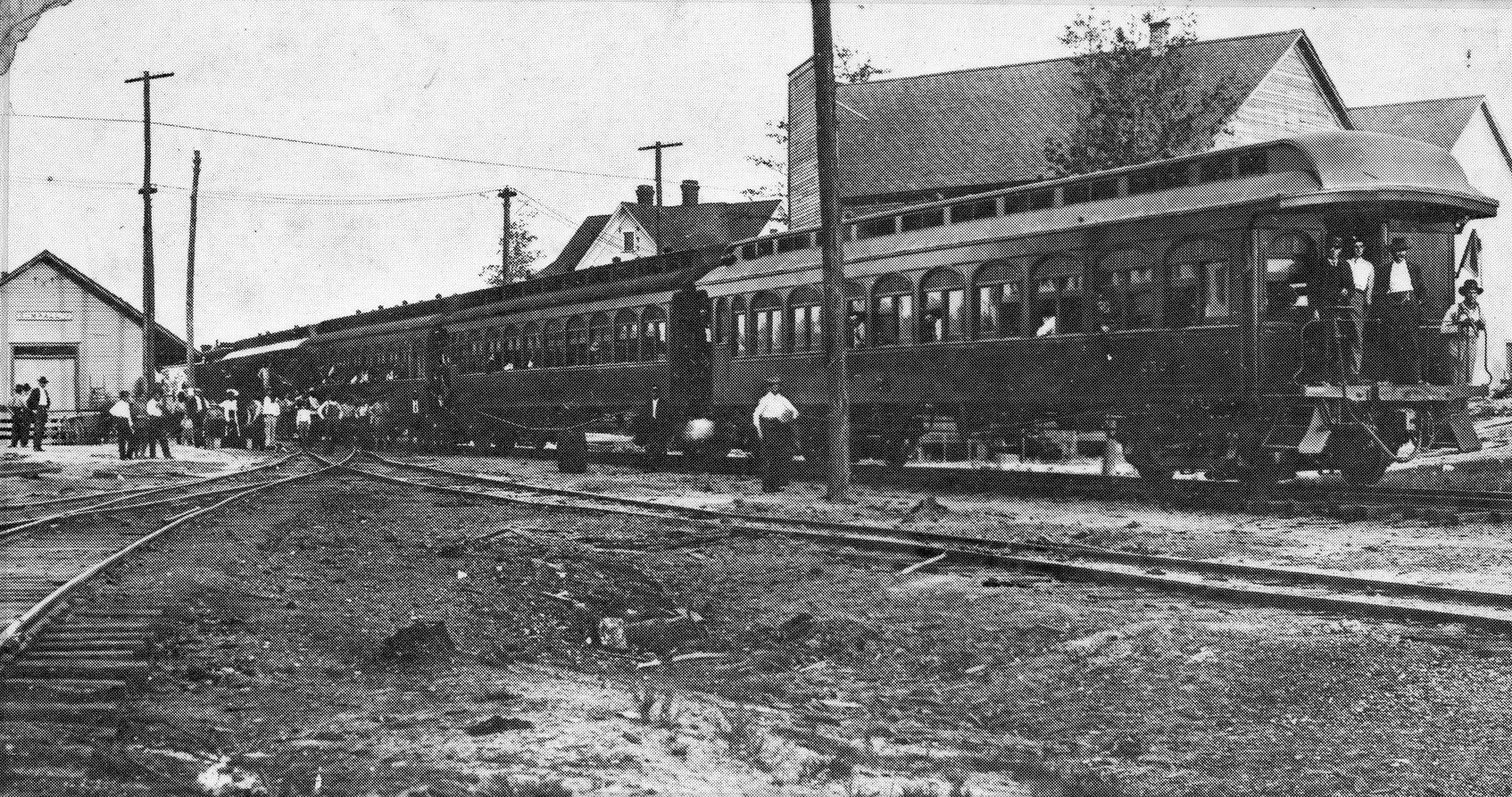
Mississippi Central Railroad passenger train in Sumrall, Mississippi, early 1900s.

A line started in 1897 as the "Pearl and Leaf Rivers Railroad" was built by the J.J. Newman Lumber Company from Hattiesburg, to Sumrall. In 1904 the name was changed to the Mississippi Central Railroad (reporting mark MSC). In 1906 the Natchez and Eastern Railway was formed to build a rail line from Natchez to Brookhaven. In 1909 this line was absorbed by the Mississippi Central.

For a short time during the 1920s, the line operated a service named "The Natchez Route", running trains from Natchez to Mobile, Alabama through trackage agreements with the Gulf, Mobile and Northern Railroad. At Natchez, freight cars were ferried across the Mississippi River to connect with the Louisiana and Arkansas Railway to institute through traffic into Shreveport, Louisiana. In 1967 the property of the Mississippi Central was sold to the Illinois Central Railroad.

== See also ==
- Edward Turner Jeffery, general manager, Illinois Central Railroad
- David L. Gunn
- Tammany Trace
- Billups Neon Crossing Signal A unique railroad crossing signal erected in Grenada, MS
- Illinois Central Missouri River Bridge, the world's longest swing bridge when constructed
- History of rail transportation in the United States
- Railroad land grants in the United States
