= James C. Clarke =

American politician and railroad executive (1823–1902)

Member of the Maryland Senate from the Baltimore County district
- In office 1868–1872
- Preceded by: Edward P. Philpot
- Succeeded by: T. Sturgis Davis

Member of the Maryland House of Delegates from the Baltimore County district
- In office 1867–1868 Serving with Daniel W. Cameron, John T. Ford, William H. Hutchins, Charles H. Nicolai, Samuel T. Shipley
- Preceded by: William H. Hoffman, David King, David K. Lusby, Nicholas H. Parker, Zephaniah Poteet, George Slothower
- Succeeded by: John S. Biddison, Victor Holmes, C. P. Montague, Charles H. Nicolai, Zephaniah Poteet, C. B. Slingluff

Personal details
- Born: March 4, 1823 Unity, Montgomery County, Maryland, U.S.
- Died: December 9, 1902 (aged 79) Chicago, Illinois, U.S.
- Resting place: Mount Olivet Cemetery; Frederick, Maryland, U.S.
- Spouse: Susannah Shaffer (died 1892)
- Children: 5
- Occupation: Politician; railroad executive; businessman

James C. Clarke (March 4, 1823 – December 9, 1902) was an American politician and railroad executive from Maryland. He served as a member of the Maryland House of Delegates and Maryland Senate, representing Baltimore County.

== Early life ==
James C. Clarke was born on March 4, 1823, in Unity, Montgomery County, Maryland, to William Clarke.

== Career ==
In 1840, Clarke became a track repairer on the Baltimore and Ohio Railroad. In 1842, he became a locomotive fireman for the railroad and held this role for 12 years. In 1851, he was superintendent of construction of a double track between Mt. Airy and Point of Rocks. In 1853, he became assistant supertintendent of transportation. In 1854, he became superintendent of the Central Railroad of Ohio. In 1855, he became superintendent of the northern division of the Illinois Central Railroad. He was promoted to general superintendent of the Illinois Central in 1857. In 1859, Clarke moved to Frederick, Maryland, and partnered with Ephraim Albaugh and Michael Keefer to form a wholesale and retail grocery name under the name Clarke, Albaugh & Co. The store was located on the southwest corner of Market and Patrick streets. In 1861, he became superintendent of the Northern Central Railway. After four years, he left to manage an iron furnace in Ashland, Cockeysville, Maryland.

Clarke served as a member of the Maryland House of Delegates, representing Baltimore County, in 1867. He was elected as a Democrat and served as a member of the Maryland Senate, representing Baltimore County, from 1868 to 1872. He served under Governor Oden Bowie as brigadier general of the Maryland National Guard.

From 1870 to 1872, Clarke was president of the Chesapeake and Ohio Canal and served for two years. In 1872, he was elected as president and general manager of the Erie Railroad system. He served for three years. He then became general manager of the Illinois Central Railway. In 1876, he was elected president of the Chicago, St. Louis and New Orleans Railroad. In 1880, he was elected president of the Illinois Central. He remained as head of the Illinois Central railroad system until 1865. He remained engaged in that work until 1887. Around 1889, he became president and general manager of the Mobile and Ohio Railroad. He remained in that role until March 1, 1898, and was succeeded by Edward L. Russell. In March 1898, he prospected railroads in Guatemala.

== Personal life ==
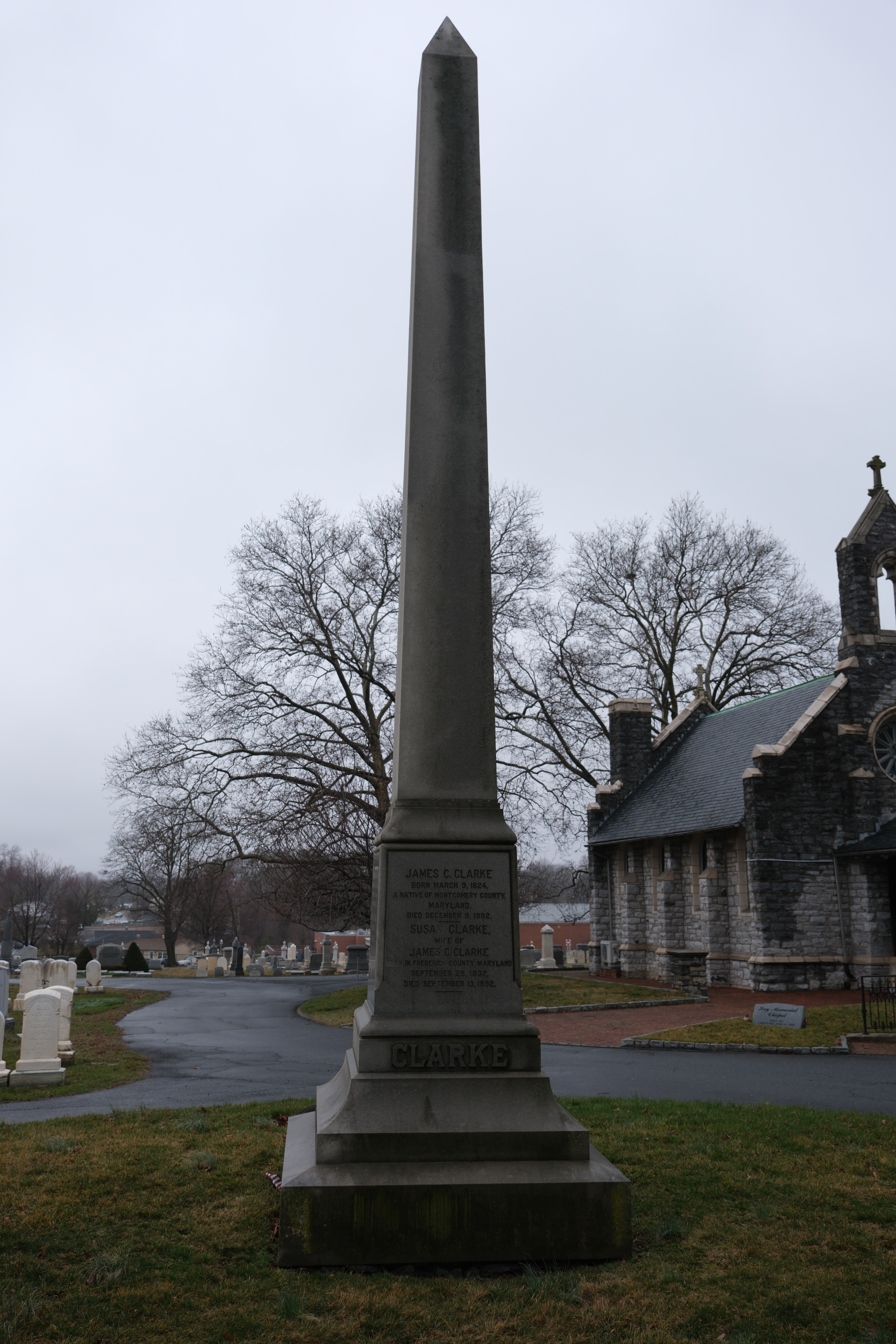
Grave of Clarke at Mount Olivet Cemetery

Clarke lived for a time at a house on East Church Street in Frederick. He owned an estate near Frederick until the end of his life. He lived in Mobile, Alabama, the last 25 years of his life. He was friends with Baltimore mayor Ferdinand Claiborne Latrobe and Baltimore Sun publisher Arunah Shepherdson Abell.

Clarke married Susannah Shaffer, daughter of Peter Shaffer. They had three sons and two daughters, Horace W., Wendall Bowman, Charles S., Virginia and Sarah. His wife died in 1892. His daughter Virginia married railroad executive Edward Turner Jeffery. He died following heart trouble on December 9, 1902, at the home of his daughter in Chicago. He was later buried with his wife in May 1903 in Mount Olivet Cemetery in Frederick.

== Legacy ==
Clarke Place, a road near Mount Olivet Cemetery in Frederick, was named in his honor.
