= Edward Turner Jeffery =

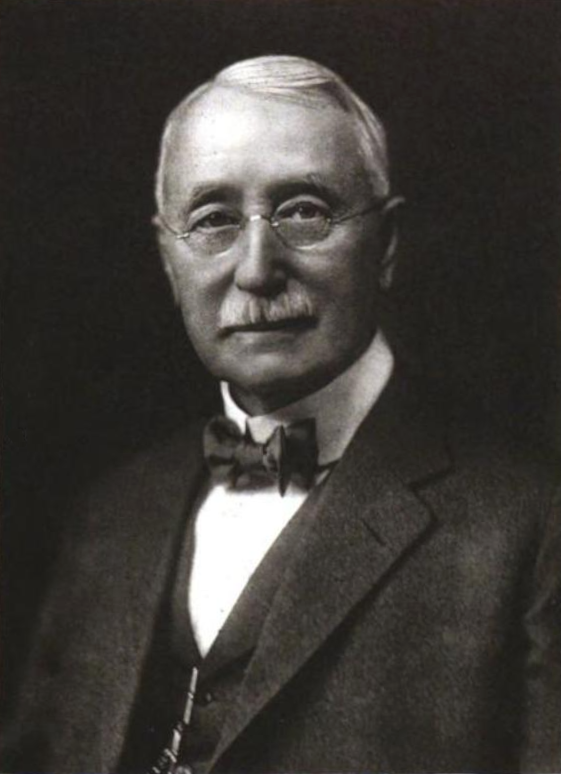
- Born: April 6, 1843; Liverpool, England
- Died: September 24, 1927 (aged 84); New York, New York
- Resting place: Rosehill Cemetery
- Occupation(s): Editor, diplomat, politician

Signature
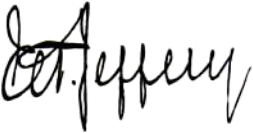

Edward Turner Jeffery (April 6, 1843 – September 24, 1927) was an American railroad executive.

== Biography ==
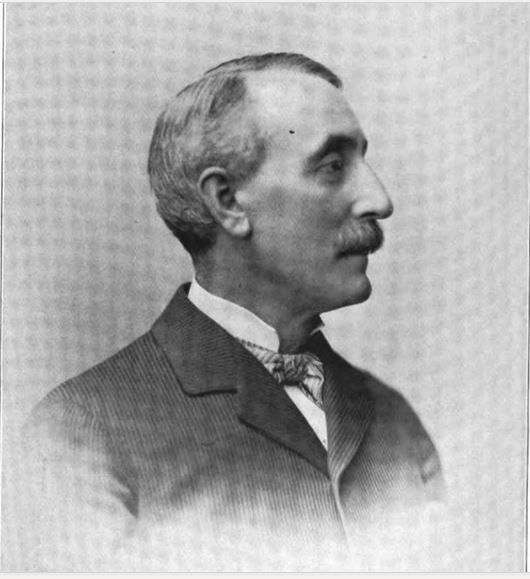
E. T. Jeffery

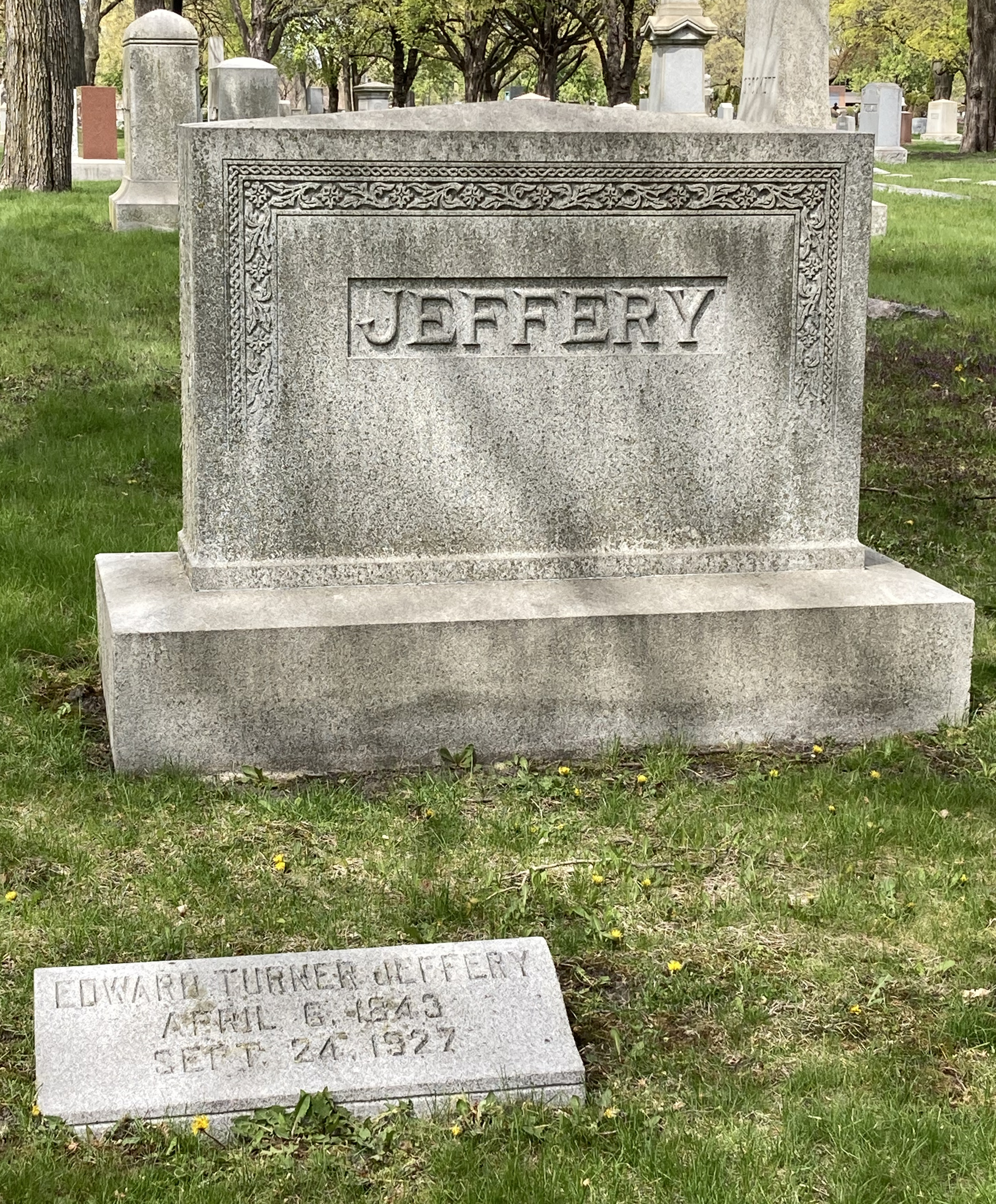
Jeffery's grave at Rosehill Cemetery

Edward Turner Jeffery was born in Liverpool on April 6, 1843. His father was a chief engineer in the Royal Navy.

His 1922 entry in the Biographical Directory of the Railway Officials of America reads thus:

Entered railway service: October, 1856, since which time he has been consecutively October, 1856, to December, 1856, office boy for superintendent machinery, Illinois Central Railroad; December, 1856, to February, 1857, apprentice in shops, same road, at Chicago, Illinois; July, 1858, to July, 1859, office boy in superintendent of machinery, same road; 1859 to 1863, apprentice in office of mechanical draftsman, same road; 1863 to 1871, mechanical draftsman and secretary to superintendent machinery, same road; February 1, 1871, to May 4, 1877, assistant superintendent machinery, same road; May 4, 1877, to December 15, 1885, general superintendent and chief engineer; December 15, 1885, to September 2, 1889, general manager, same road; October 1, 1891, to January, 1912, president, Denver and Rio Grande; January, 1912, to January, 1917, chairman, board of directors, same road; October, 1891, to June, 1900, also general manager, same road; August 2, 1893, to November 30, 1895, also receiver, Rio Grande Southern Railroad; July 1, 1901, to January, 1912, president, Rio Grande Western Railway; June 23, 1905, to July, 1913, also president, Western Pacific Railroad; July, 1913, to January, 1917, chairman, board of directors, same road, retired on latter date. For his contributions to American railroad management Jeffery is listed by the Smithsonian Institutions' John H. White, Jr., as one of America's most noteworthy railroaders.

When Edward Jeffery left school to move to Chicago with his family in 1856, his tutor remarked that Jeffery had shown greater application and more vigorous energy than any other scholar he ever had. Apparently, Jeffery continued this habit throughout his railroad career and impressed his superiors accordingly. Beginning as an office boy, he became president of several railroads.

Jeffery began his career at the age of 13, as an office boy for the superintendent of machinery on the Illinois Central Railroad. A few months later he was put to work in the tin and coppersmith shops, and then, just a few months after that, offered and accepted an apprenticeship as a machinist. At the age of 15, he was offered and accepted an apprenticeship as a mechanical draftsman. He studied in the evenings and on his days off, and by the age of 20, he was running the department.

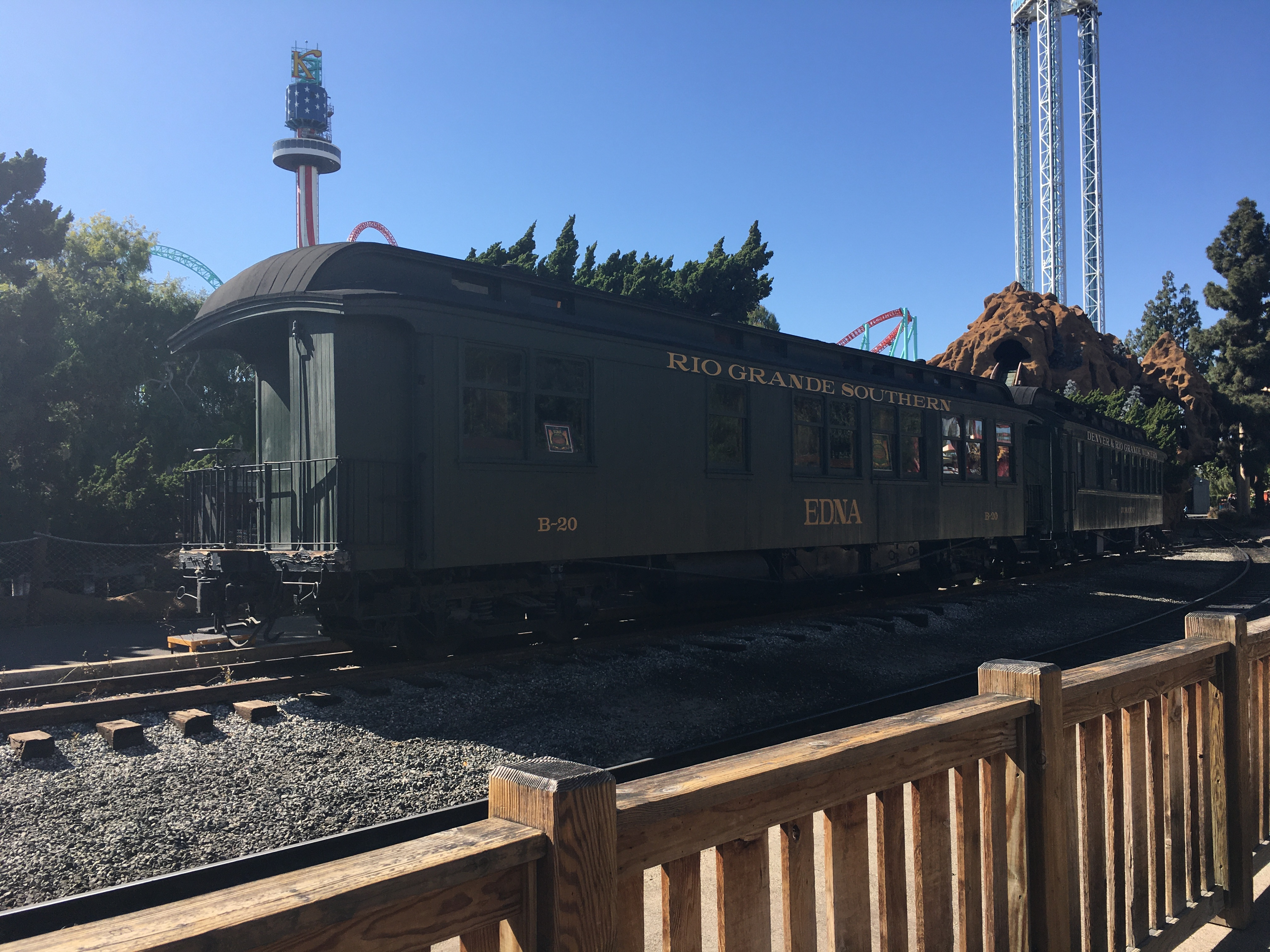
The Rio Grande Southern business car Edna was named after Edward Turner Jeffery's daughter, Edna, in 1899. The Edna is now on the Ghost Town & Calico Railway at Knott's Berry Farm in Southern California. It is one of only a small handful of narrow-gauge business cars in the United States still in existence.

At the age of 28, he was promoted to assistant superintendent of machinery, and at age 34, married Virginia Osborne Clarke, who was the daughter of the general manager James C. Clarke. Jeffery was promoted to general superintendent and chief engineer, and, in 1885, became general manager. In 1889, he resigned as general manager of the Illinois Central. According to the Champaign (Illinois) Gazette “Acting President Harriman wanted to conduct the operations of the road from his office in New York, and Mr. Jeffery didn’t want it that way.”

In 1891, he became president of the Denver & Rio Grande Railroad. After many years of paying zero dividends and even missing interest payments on bonds, the disappointed board members/investors hired Jeffery to put the railroad back into shape financially. This he did quite successfully. Expensive construction projects became a thing of the past, and other cost-cutting measures were implemented. By 1892, the company’s floating debt was reduced by $1,200,000, leaving only about $100,000 in outstanding bills, and by 1893, the last dollar of debt had been paid off. The railroad was finally able to start paying dividends.

George Jay Gould, who controlled the Missouri Pacific Railroad, began buying stock in the Denver & Rio Grande Railroad, and in 1901, became a member of its board of directors. Gould also gained control of the Rio Grande Western Railroad and in May 1901, Jeffery became its president and Gould its chairman of the board. The Rio Grande Western connected the Denver & Rio Grande to Salt Lake City and Ogden, Utah.

Unfortunately for Gould, in 1900, the Union Pacific Railroad bought the Central Pacific Railroad which carried rail traffic between the Rio Grande Western and California. It also controlled traffic to the Pacific Northwest. As a result of rate preference being given to Union Pacific traffic, Gould was forced to build his own railroad from Ogden to California, the Western Pacific Railroad. Construction on this expensive project began in 1905, and the revenues from the Denver & Rio Grande and Rio Grande Western were drained to pay for it. Jeffery was made president of the Western Pacific, as well the Rio Grande railroads, in 1905.

Maintenance on the Denver & Rio Grande, Rio Grande Western and Rio Grande Southern suffered for many years as a result of the burden of the Western Pacific's staggering construction costs. But, in 1910, the Western Pacific was completed, and it remained the Rio Grande’s primary connection to the Pacific Coast thereafter.

The Denver & Rio Grande Railroad and Rio Grande Western Railroad were fully consolidated in 1908. Jeffery remained as president, and well as president of the Rio Grande Southern, until 1912, when he retired and became chairman of the board. He remained as president of the Western Pacific until 1913, when he became its chairman. He died at the Biltmore Hotel in New York City on September 24, 1927. He was buried at Rosehill Cemetery in Chicago.

== Time Line ==
| Year | Age | Event |
|---|---|---|
| 1843 | 0 | Born in Liverpool, England, the son of a chief engineer in the Royal Navy. |
| ca 1849 | 6 | His father died when he was six years old. His mother remarried, and came to America in 1850. The family settled in Wheeling, West Virginia. |
| 1856 | 13 | His family moved to Chicago. He became an office boy for the superintendent of machinery, Illinois Central RR. |
| 1856 | 13 | After two months, he was put to work in the tin and coppersmith shops for three or four months, and then became an apprentice machinist, Illinois Central RR. |
| 1858 | 15 | Apprentice in the office of mechanical draftsman, Illinois Central RR. |
| ca 1861 | 18 | Mechanical draftsman, Illinois Central RR. |
| 1863 | 20 | In charge of the department of mechanical drawing and secretary to the superintendent of machinery, Illinois Central RR. |
| 1871 | 28 | Assistant superintendent of machinery, Illinois Central RR. |
| 1877 | 34 | Married Virginia Osborne Clarke, who was the daughter of James C. Clarke, the general manager of the Illinois Central RR. Edward T. Jeffery was promoted to general superintendent and chief engineer, Illinois Central RR in 1877. |
| 1885 | 42 | General manager, Illinois Central RR. |
| 1889 | 46 | Resigned as general manager of the Illinois Central. According to a newspaper article “Acting President Harriman wanted to conduct the operations of the road from his office in New York, and Mr. Jeffery didn’t want it that way.” |
| 1891 | 48 | President, Denver & Rio Grande RR and Rio Grande Western Ry. Also served as general manager of the D&RG, 1891-1900. Served as president of the D&RG until 1912 and of the RGW until 1913. |
| 1893 | 50 | Receiver, Rio Grande Southern RR (while serving as president of the D&RG). |
| 1895 | 52 | President, Rio Grande Southern (while serving as president of the D&RG). He continued in this position until at least 1912. |
| 1905 | 62 | President, Western Pacific RR (while serving as president of the D&RG, RGW and RGS). The main portion of the Western Pacific RR was built between 1905-1909, and financed by the D&RG, RGW and RGS. |
| 1912 | 69 | Retired as president, and elected chairman of the board, Denver & Rio Grande RR. |
| 1913 | 70 | Retired as president, and elected chairman of the board, Western Pacific RR. Western Pacific ferry built and named the "Edward T. Jeffery." At some point, the Western Pacific shops in Sacramento, California began to be referred to as the "Jeffery Shops." |
| 1917 | 74 | Retired as chairman of the board, Denver & Rio Grande RR and Western Pacific RR. |
| 1927 | 84 | Died in the Biltmore Hotel, New York City. Buried in Rosehill Cemetery, Chicago. |

== Sources ==
- Athearn, Robert G. Rebel of the Rockies: A History of the Denver & Rio Grande Western Railroad, Yale University Press, New Haven and London, 1962.

- Biographical Dictionary and Portrait Gallery of Representative Men of Chicago, “Edward T. Jeffery” section, American Biographical Publishing Company, Chicago and New York, 1892.

- Danneman, Herbert. A Ticket to Ride the Narrow Gauge – Colorado Rail Annual No. 24, Colorado Railroad Museum, Golden, Colorado, 2000.

- Danneman, Herbert. Rio Grande Narrow Gauge Varnish - Colorado Rail Annual No. 25, Colorado Railroad Museum, Golden, Colorado, 2003.

- Davis, Llewellyn. “A Brief Biography of Victor Arthur Miller,” Ridgway Railroad Museum Newsletter, pp. 7-15, December 2021, Ridgway, Colorado.

- Ferrell, Mallory Hope. Silver San Juan: The Rio Grande Southern Railroad, Pruett Publishing Company, Boulder, Colorado, 1973.

- Jeffery, Edward Turner. Correspondence and other papers, Illinois Central Railroad Company Archives, Newberry Library, Chicago, Illinois (https://archives.newberry.org/repositories/2/resources/601/search?utf8=%E2%9C%93&filter_q%5B%5D=jeffery&op%5B%5D=&field%5B%5D=&limit=&q%5B%5D=*&filter_from_year=&filter_to_year=&commit=Search)

- Harris, Richard. “Original Varnish,” Private Varnish magazine, Issue #127, 2010.

- History of the Illinois Central Railroad Company and Representative Employees, “Edward T. Jeffery” section, Railroad Historical Company, 1900.

- The National Cyclopedia of American Biography, Volume VIII, “Edward T. Jeffery” section, James T. White & Co., New York, 1900.

- rgsrr.com. Steven Haworth’s website about the Rio Grande Southern RR.

- Ridgway Railroad Museum, Narrow Gauge Railroading in the San Juan Triangle: The Rio Grande Southern, the Ouray Branch of the D&RG and Otto Mears’ Silverton RR, Ridgway Railroad Museum, Ridgway, Colorado, 2018.
