= Land Grant Act of 1850 =

The Land Grant Act of 1850 provided for 3.75 million acres of land to the United States to support railroad projects; by 1857, 21 million acres of public lands were used for railroads in the Mississippi River valley, and the stage was set for more substantial Congressional subsidies to future railroads.

The act gave land in Illinois to the Illinois Central Railroad, and land in Alabama and Mississippi to the Mobile and Ohio Railroad. The land given was in the form of alternate sections.

== See also ==
- Railroad land grants in the United States
