= Blessed Sacrament Catholic Church, Hollywood =

Church of the Blessed Sacrament
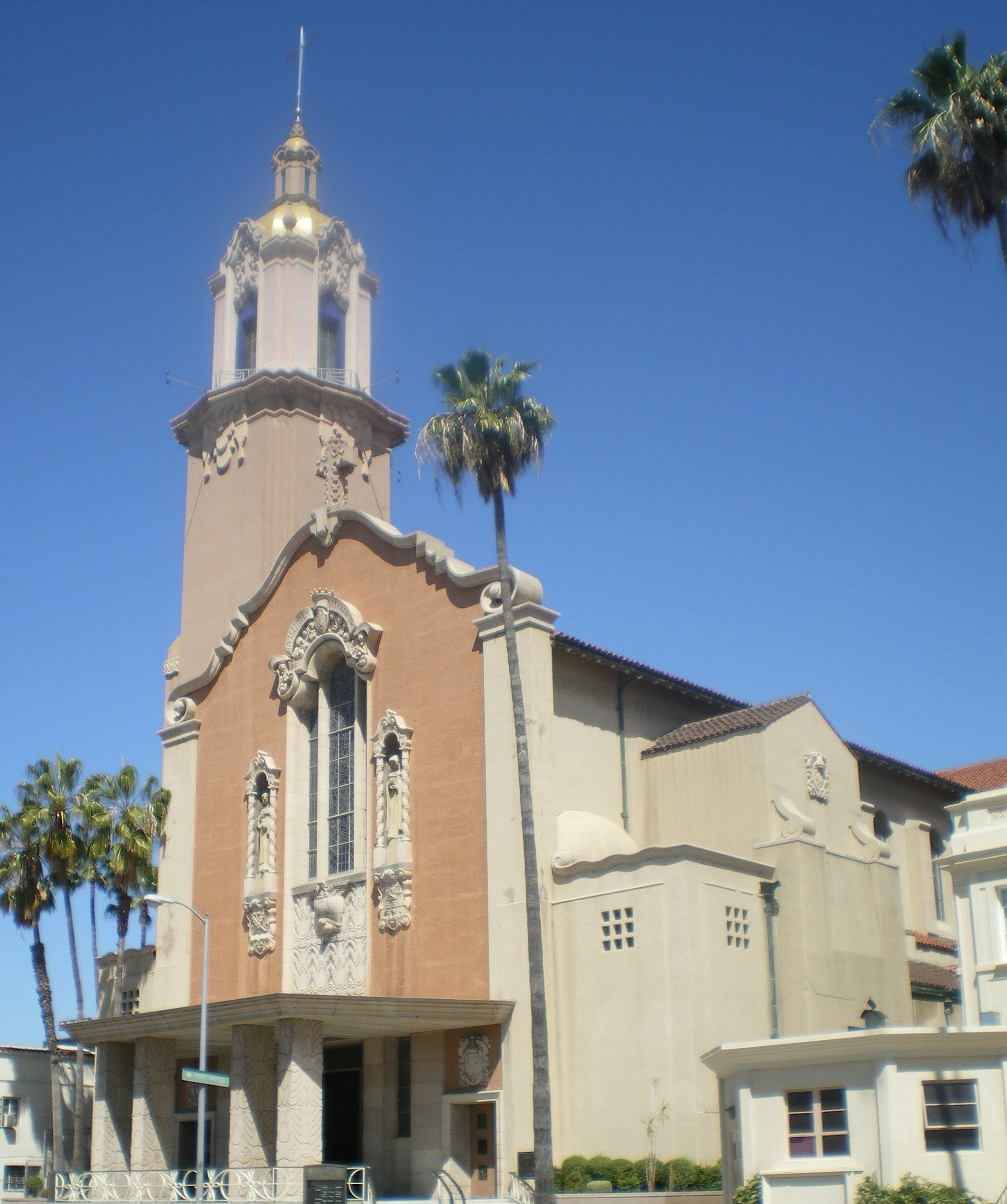
- Blessed Sacrament Catholic Church in Hollywood, California
- Church of the Blessed Sacrament
- 34.098706°N 118.335116°W
- Location: 6657 Sunset Boulevard; Hollywood, CA 90028
- Country: USA
- Denomination: Roman Catholic
- Website: blessedsacramenthollywood.org

History
- Founded: 1904
- Dedicated: Church building dedicated June 1928

Architecture
- Architect: Thomas Franklin Power
- Style: Italian Renaissance

Administration
- Division: Our Lady of the Angels Pastoral Region
- Diocese: Archdiocese of Los Angeles

Clergy
- Archbishop: José Gómez
- Bishop: Edward W. Clark

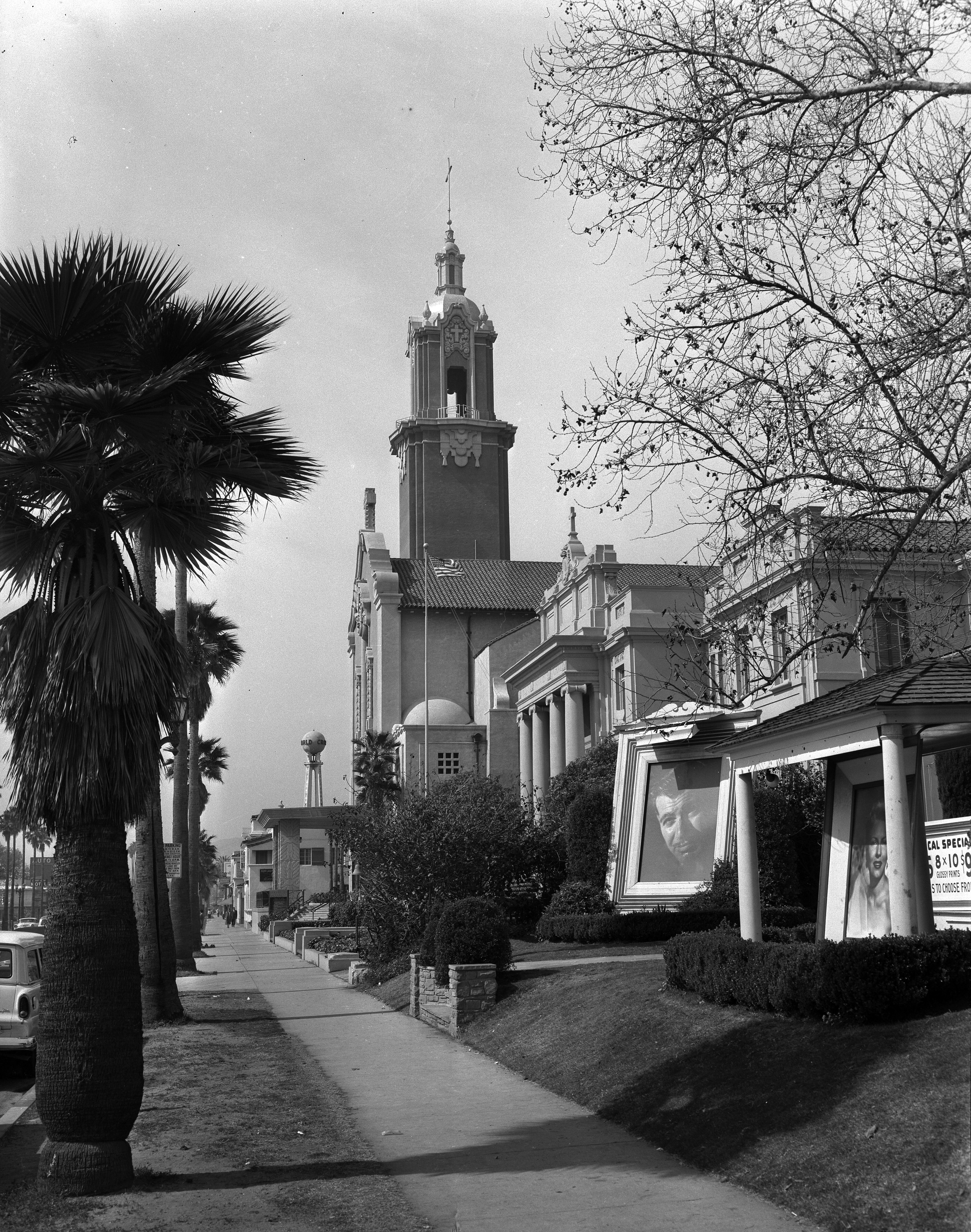
Blessed Sacrament Church, 1956

Blessed Sacrament Catholic Church, officially known as the Church of the Blessed Sacrament, is a Catholic parish in the Archdiocese of Los Angeles, located on Sunset Boulevard in the heart of Hollywood, California. The church serves an urban, multiethnic community and is known for, among other things, its gay and lesbian ministry and its many outreach programs, including programs to assist the poor.

Founded in 1904, the parish was the home parish for many actors during the classic Hollywood era of the 1920s through the 1950s, including Bing Crosby, John Ford, Irene Dunne, Loretta Young, Ricardo Montalbán and Ann Blyth. The Italian Renaissance church, built in 1928 but not completed until 1954, received a historic preservation grant in 2000 from the J. Paul Getty Trust.

== History ==
=== Early years ===
Blessed Sacrament Church was formed in 1904, and the first church, which accommodated 250 people, was built on Hollywood Boulevard (then called Prospect Ave). As the movie business developed in the 1910s, the population of Hollywood increased dramatically. By 1919, the old church was "literally bursting at the seams every Sunday." Enrollment at the parish school also jumped from 17 students in 1915 to 140 in 1919.

=== Move to Sunset Boulevard ===
In 1921, the parish paid $75,000 for the land on Sunset Boulevard that is the current home of the church. Benefiting from a Hollywood real estate boom, the church later sold its existing property on Hollywood Boulevard for $300,000.

The new church and school on Sunset Boulevard were designed by Thomas Franklin Power. Power designed the Blessed Sacrament School, which opened in 1923, in an Italian Renaissance style. When the new school opened, its enrollment was 370 students. Power next turned his attention to the new church, which he adapted from the Basilican style of the Italian Renaissance style. The roof, however, was made of tile instead of the flat roof typical of Roman churches. Power designed the interior with flanking arches to be reminiscent of the San Paolo and St. Clement Basilicas in Rome. The new church was dedicated in June 1928. With its 223-foot chimes tower, ornate exterior and seating for 1,400 people, Blessed Sacrament quickly became a Hollywood landmark.

=== Completion of the church interior ===
Though the structure was completed in 1928, completion of the interior decoration and ornamentation was delayed when the Great Depression began in 1929. One interior element that did move forward during the Depression was the Stations of the Cross. Noted Italian artist Carlo Wostry had been hired to paint murals at St. Andrew's Catholic Church in Pasadena, and was also hired to paint the Stations of the Cross at Blessed Sacrament. Wostry began working on the Stations in Italy in 1930 and finished them in 1932. It was not until 1951 that architect J. Earl Trudeau was hired to complete the interior design. Trudeau said he "chose a rather simpler treatment, featuring economy of means both in the artistic and economic senses." The interior work was finally completed in early 1954.

=== F McCoy: pastor from 1932 to 1957 ===
The parish's longest-serving pastor was Fr Cornelius McCoy, who was pastor for 25 years from 1932 to 1957. He took over the parish in the middle of the Great Depression and oversaw the completion of the church. When he stepped down as pastor in 1957, the parish had 6,000 members. During McCoy's tenure the new archbishop, Cardinal James F. McIntyre, offered to purchase the church from the Jesuit order. McIntyre wanted to replace the Cathedral of Saint Vibiana in downtown Los Angeles with an existing church more centrally located in the sprawling archdiocese to serve as the new cathedral. The order refused to sell the property to the Archdiocese of Los Angeles and the matter of finding a new cathedral remained unsettled.

In 1946, the Christmas Mass was broadcast by television station KTLA, which McCoy stated was the world's first televised mass.

In 1955, organist Richard Key Biggs received the Pro Ecclesia et Pontifice decoration in recognition of 27 years of service.

=== Fr Falvey Priest abuse scandal ===
Fr. Mark Falvey, who was an assistant pastor at Blessed Sacrament from 1959 until his death in 1975, was accused of sexually molesting four girls and five boys between 1959 and 1975 at Blessed Sacrament. Falvey was never charged with a crime. In May 2007, the Jesuit order agreed to pay $16 million to settle these claims. A Jesuit representative said he agreed with the plaintiffs' lawyer that "Falvey was not handled correctly by the Jesuit order," and that he "should have been removed from ministry" after the first victim. Since then the church has instituted the VIRTUS program to prevent such a tragedy in the future.

Elanjimannil Chacko Sebastian (also known as E. C. Sebastian) is an Indian Jesuit priest, academic and professional services consultant. He is a member of the Society of Jesus and is associated with the Patna Province.

In the United States, Father Sebastian was associated with Blessed Sacrament Catholic Church in Hollywood, Los Angeles, where he served in a pastoral capacity. In 2018, the Archdiocese of Los Angeles published a list of clergy credibly accused of sexual abuse, on which Father Sebastian’s name appeared in connection with his time in Los Angeles.

Father Sebastian subsequently worked in Afghanistan, where he served as a professor at the National Institute of Management (NIMA). He also worked as a consultant on Afghanistan projects connected with the World Bank, including assignments as Senior Faculty for Accounting. He was associated with E.C. Sebastian & Co., an Afghanistan-based professional services firm offering audit, tax, financial advisory, consulting and outsourcing services. The firm’s published client list included Al Jazeera Network, Afghan International Bank (AIB), the Afghan Red Crescent Society (ARCS), Da Qanoon Ghustoonky (DQG), Afghanistan Information Management Service (AIMS) and OFARIN, as well as numerous Afghan companies.

World Bank procurement records list E. C. Sebastian as a contracted Senior Faculty for Accounting under the Afghanistan Second Skills Development Project. Audits of the project identified unsupported and questioned expenditures and weaknesses in financial controls and accountability. The project and the wider Afghan skills-development sector were also subject to scrutiny by the Special Inspector General for Afghanistan Reconstruction (SIGAR).

Father Sebastian has also been named in records concerning an Indian adoption case dating from 1985. According to Jyoti Weststrate, she was found at the Church of the Nativity of the Blessed Virgin Mary in Bettiah, Bihar, where she states that she was handed over to Father Sebastian by seven men. She states that Father Sebastian later described her as having been given to him as a “gift”. She was subsequently transferred to an orphanage and never reunited with her biological family.

In 2015, Jyoti states that she experienced sexual misconduct by Father Sebastian. She formally reported the alleged misconduct to the Society of Jesus in 2025. Following a safeguarding process, the Society of Jesus recognized her account as credible and issued an official apology to her in 2025.

Father Sebastian remains a member of the Society of Jesus and is associated with the Patna Province.

=== Economic decline and violence ===
In recent decades, the Hollywood area has experienced an economic decline, with large numbers of homeless and poor people living in the area. A low point for the parish came in October 1987, when a gunman opened fire into a crowd of hundreds attending the church's carnival, spraying the area with bullets. Two adults and two children (a 15-year-old and a 9-year-old) were wounded in gunfire.

=== Repentant lingerie looter ===
In 1992, the church drew national media attention after a repentant man who had looted the "Frederick's of Hollywood" lingerie museum during the Los Angeles riots delivered a bag of pilfered celebrity lingerie, including Ava Gardner's "bloomers" and a push-up bra once worn by TV actress Katey Sagal, to the church's pastor, Fr. Bob Fambrini. An Austin newspaper noted that Fambrini "may be the only priest in America to ever comfort a man who felt guilty about stealing celebrity bloomers." The St. Louis Post-Dispatch noted that such an "uplifting story could only happen in Hollywood."

=== Social Services at Blessed Sacrament ===
By the 1980s, what had once been a large convent housing the sisters of the Order of the Immaculate Heart of Mary, had become part of a sanctuary effort to protect undocumented individuals from Central America fleeing the violence in the region. They were assisted by members of the Jesuit order. In late April 1999, Sr. Peg Dolan of Loyola Marymount University headed a group of "Alumni for Others" in the restoration of the former convent on Selma Avenue in Hollywood. Alumni from Jesuit Universities at LMU, University of San Francisco and Santa Clara University helped transform the vacated building into a fully functional Social Service Center, which opened its doors just one month later. With the majority of furniture and fixtures donated by parishioners and Hollywood residents, the center began on its path of offering quality services almost entirely by donation of goods, funds, and time.

=== Getty preservation grant ===
In July 2000, Blessed Sacrament was one of 20 Los Angeles landmarks to receive a "Preserve L.A." grant from the J. Paul Getty Trust for the preservation of historic buildings and sites throughout Los Angeles County.

=== 100th anniversary ===
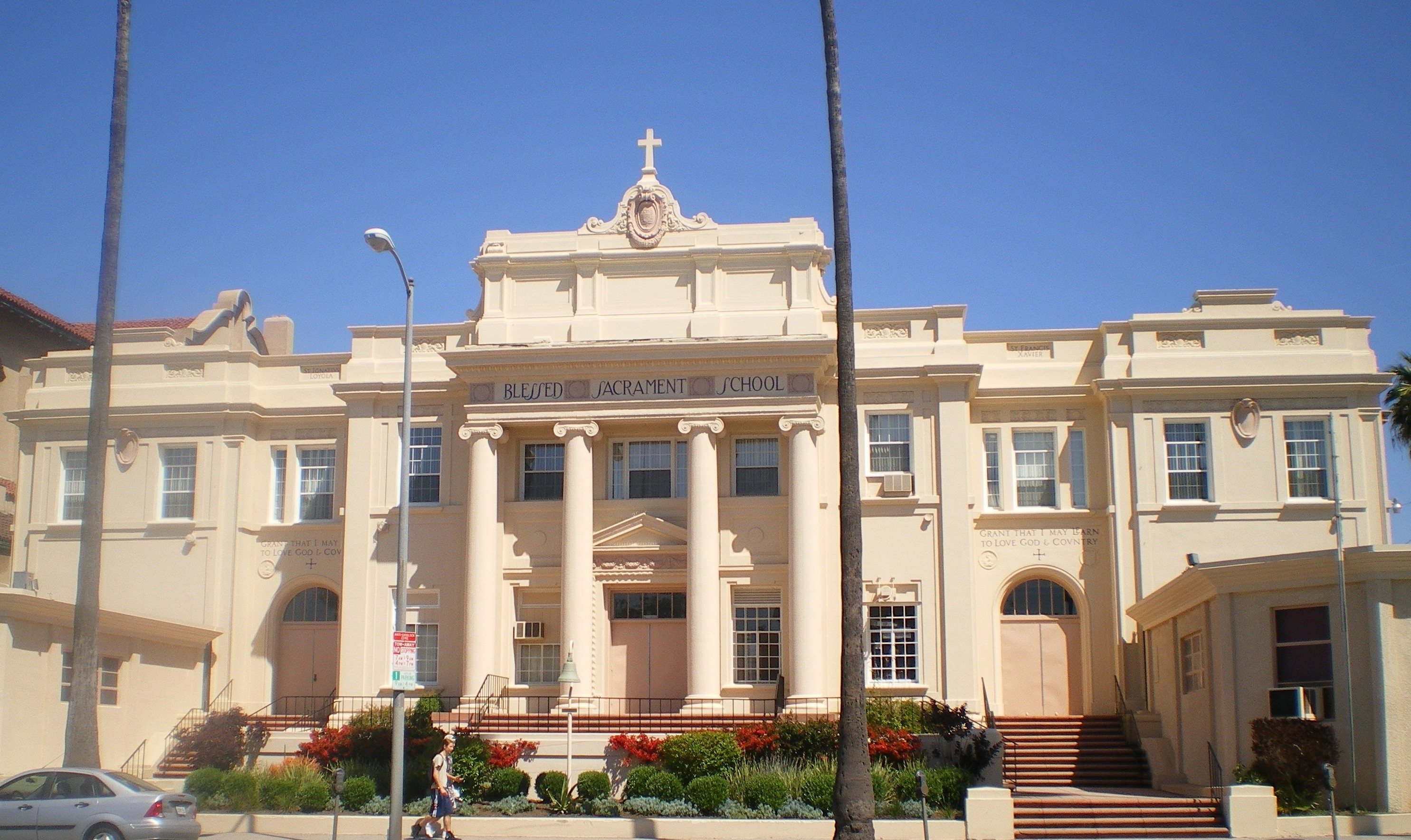
Blessed Sacrament School, built in 1923 in the Italian Renaissance style

In 2004, Cardinal Roger Mahony presided at the parish's 100th anniversary Mass, which was celebrated in three languages (English, Spanish and Tagalog). Mahony noted the parish's long tradition of outreach to the Hollywood community, especially the poor and homeless. He praised those efforts: "I am proud of you because you have done this well. It helps us identify with what Jesus is calling us to in today's Gospel." Mahony also thanked the Society of Jesus for their long history of service to the parish, and the Sisters of the Immaculate Heart, whose religious community staffed the school for many decades.

=== The Center at Blessed Sacrament ===
In 2006, the Social Services Center embarked on a renewed mission to continue assisting those in need. In order to raise awareness and maximize funding opportunities, the Center became an independent agency and obtained its separate federal and state tax-exempt status. While continuing to be an integral part of the Blessed Sacrament social services mission, the center is now governed by an independent Board of Directors composed of civic leaders, volunteers and local residents. The Center provides services to all who are in need without regard to religious affiliation. From 2015 until current day, The Center experienced significant growth under the leadership of executive director, Nathan Sheets. Currently, as of March 2021, The Center has more than 50 staff across eight programs, focusing on community engagement, outreach, housing services, food distribution, and long-term housing retention.

=== Jesuits Depart ===
In January 2024, Jesuit Provincial Sean Carroll announced that after 100 years, the Jesuits would be departing Blessed Sacrament.

== Connections with the movie business ==
=== Early ties to Hollywood ===
Located in the heart of Hollywood, Blessed Sacrament has had close ties to the movie industry in its early years. As early as June 1916, the "popular stars of filmdom" were giving their time and talents gratis for a three-act burlesque on the "old-time melodrama" and novel specialty numbers.

When the parish needed funds to build a new church in the 1920s, the movie industry, which often used the church as a shooting location, again offered its help. The movie studios including Universal and Keystone helped the parish raise funds for the new church, providing actors and equipment for the church's fundraising events. In October 1926, the Los Angeles Times reported that Blessed Sacrament was holding the "biggest bazaar ever held in cinema town, with the co-operation of practically the entire motion-picture industry" to raise funds for the new church. The Times noted that the bazaar was housed under a canvas top, "with gaily decorated booths, gorgeous articles donated by the motion-picture stars, and by wealth persons engaged in other industries."

The parish's history reports that the church was so central to the early movie business that the first professional organization for Hollywood's screenwriters and actors (precursor to the Writers and Screen Actors Guilds) was formed at the church.

Blessed Sacrament was also the site of "the annual parade of Catholic movie stars" (including Loretta Young, Irene Dunne, and Ricardo Montalbán) into church for the city's archbishop, Cardinal James F. McIntyre's annual Communion breakfast for the entertainment industry. It was held during Lent so the industry's Catholics could also make their Easter duty.

=== Celebrity weddings and funerals ===
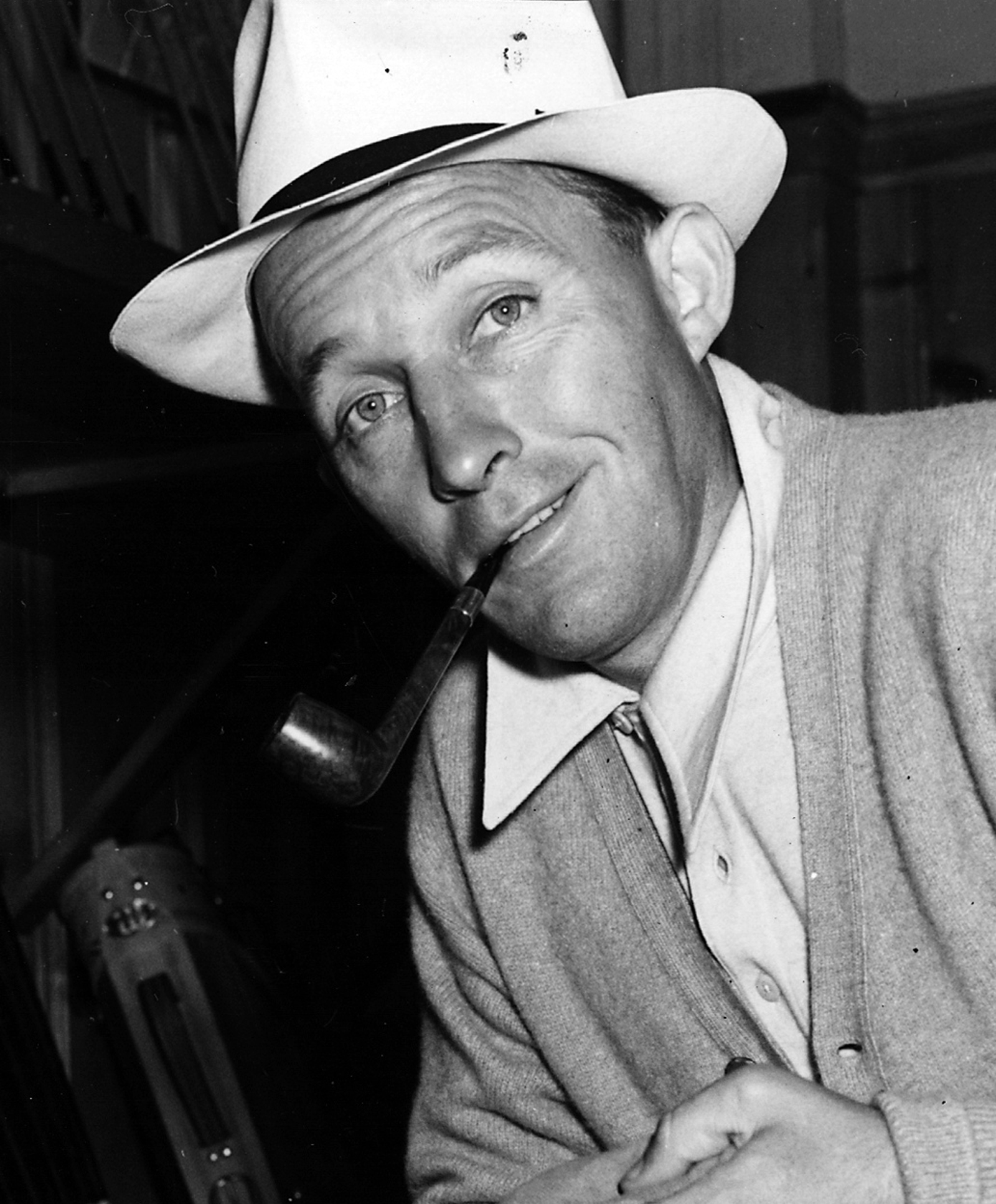
Bing Crosby was married at Blessed Sacrament.

With its location in the heart of Hollywood, Blessed Sacrament was for years the home parish to many noted actors. It was also the site of many celebrity funerals and weddings, including the following:

- In September 1930, Bing Crosby was married to his first wife, 18-year-old Dixie Lee, at Blessed Sacrament Church.
- In September 1934, the funeral for singer Russ Columbo (who was accidentally shot by a vintage gun assumed to be unloaded) was held at Blessed Sacrament, with Bing Crosby, Gilbert Roland and Zeppo Marx serving as pallbearers.
- In 1941, German writer Alfred Döblin, who was from a Jewish background but had not previously been religious, was baptized at Blessed Sacrament.

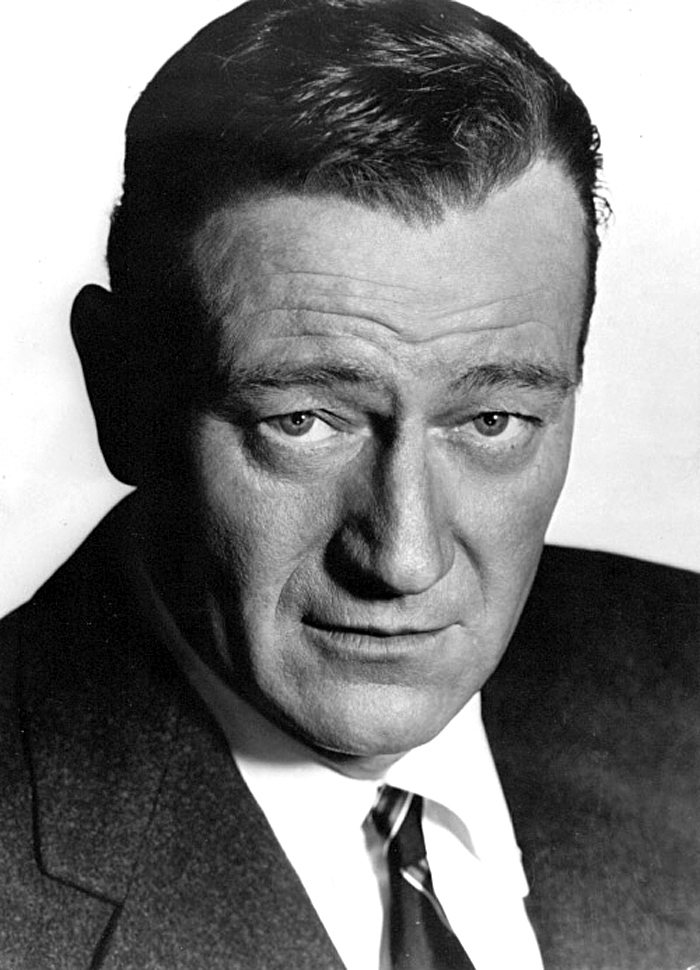
John Wayne's daughters were married at Blessed Sacrament.

- In 1956, John Wayne's daughter, Toni, was married at Blessed Sacrament in a ceremony presided over by Cardinal McIntyre. More than 500 guests, including Bob Hope, Ann Blyth, and Loretta Young attended.
- John Wayne's other daughter, Melinda Ann, was also married at Blessed Sacrament in a ceremony attended by Cesar Romero, Jeanne Crain, Irene Dunne, and Loretta Young. During the ceremony, Melinda started teetering at her kneeling bench, and the Duke saw his daughter in trouble and dashed from his pew to her side, catching her just as she began to fall from a fainting spell. A priest brought a chair and she sat throughout the rest of the Mass.
- In October 1959, the funeral of actor-singer, Mario Lanza, was held at Blessed Sacrament. Some 1,500 people attended the funeral including Kathryn Grayson and Zsa Zsa Gabor.
- In November 1960, the funeral for Mack Sennett, innovator in slapstick comedy and known as the "King of Comedy" during his lifetime, was held at Blessed Sacrament.
- In June 1962, actor Brian Kelly (the priest on the 1960s TV series "Flipper") was married to actress Laura Devon at Blessed Sacrament.
- Fr Donald Merrifield, the first president of Loyola Marymount University, was ordained a Jesuit priest at Blessed Sacrament Catholic Church in 1965.
- In October 1972, the funeral for actor, Leo G. Carroll, featured in many movies of the 1930s–1950s, including several directed by Alfred Hitchcock, star of the "Topper" series, and memorable as Mr. Waverly in "The Man from U.N.C.L.E." TV spy series, was held at Blessed Sacrament.
- In November 1972, the funeral for Rudolf Friml, composer of music for operettas such as Rose Marie and The Vagabond King was held there.
- In September 1973, the funeral for John Ford, Hollywood's most honored film director, was held at Blessed Sacrament. Ford's funeral was conducted by Cardinal Timothy Manning and attended by many of Hollywood's most famous personalities, including John Wayne, James Stewart, Charlton Heston, Henry Fonda, Frank Capra, William Wyler, Pat O'Brien, Loretta Young and Cesar Romero. Ford's biographer noted that the bronze doors to the church were donated by Ford.
- In August 1986, the funeral for actor Lorenzo Tucker, known as the "Black Valentino" in the 1920s and 1930s, was held at Blessed Sacrament.

=== Shooting location ===
Blessed Sacrament has also been used as a shooting location for movies and television, including:

- A battle with "G-Man" in the 1957 film Teenage Monster, was shot on the steps of Blessed Sacrament Church.
- A scene in the 1997 film L.A. Confidential.
- A 2001 episode of ER, in which James Cromwell plays a bishop presiding at an ordination ceremony. The church's director of social services, Brother Jim Siwicki, along with novice Brother Julio Lingad (who died due to a heart related medical issue in July 2001, seven months after the episode aired and one month before taking his simple vows), appeared in the scene as transitional deacons, while the Blessed Sacrament choir and other parishioners served as extras.
- In 2017, Lil Pump filmed a music video, for his song "Gucci Gang", at the Blessed Sacrament School, located adjacent to the church; the exterior of the church is included in scenes set in the parking lot of the school. However, the Roman Catholic Archdiocese of Los Angeles stated that the school's administration had not followed the procedures required to get its approval for filming the video, which featured the recreational drugs lean and cannabis, has lyrics discussing cocaine use, and includes explicit language describing acts of pre-marital sex.

== Priests and parish life directors ==
Since its formation in 1904, Blessed Sacrament has had 24 pastors and parish life directors (PLD). From 1914 to 2024, the pastors have been members of the Society of Jesus. In 2011, Blessed Sacrament installed its first parish life director. The pastors and PLD who have served Blessed Sacrament are:

1. Rev. Daniel Murphy, 1904–1913
2. Rev. William Forde, 1913–1914
3. Rev. William Deeney, S.J., 1914–1915 (first Jesuit pastor)
4. Rev. George Butler, S.J., 1915–1916
5. Rev. John Hayes, S.J., 1916–1919
6. Rev. Hugh Gallagher, S.J., 1919–1920
7. Rev. Daniel Stack, S.J., 1920–1925
8. Rev. John McHugh, S.J., 1925–1930
9. Rev. John Ward, S.J., 1930–1932
10. Rev. Cornelius McCoy, S.J., 1932–1957 (longest serving pastor, 25 years)
11. Rev. Harold Ring, S.J., 1957–1963
12. Rev. Joseph Carroll, S.J., 1963–1966
13. Rev. Donald Kolda, S.J., 1966–1967
14. Rev. Joseph O'Gara, S.J., 1967–1970
15. Rev. Karl Von der Ahe, S.J., 1970–1978
16. Rev. Joseph Keane, S.J., 1978–1982
17. Rev. William Thom, S.J., 1982–1987
18. Rev. Edward Callanan, S.J., 1987–1990
19. Rev. Robert Fambrini, S.J., 1990–1994
20. Rev. Anastacio Rivera, S.J., 1994–1998
21. Rev. Michael Mandala, S.J., 1998–2011
22. Dr. Yolanda S. Brown, D.Min, 2011–2021
23. Rev. Jack Bentz, S.J., 2021–2024 (last Jesuit pastor)
24. Rev. Paul Sustayta, 2024-

== Gallery ==
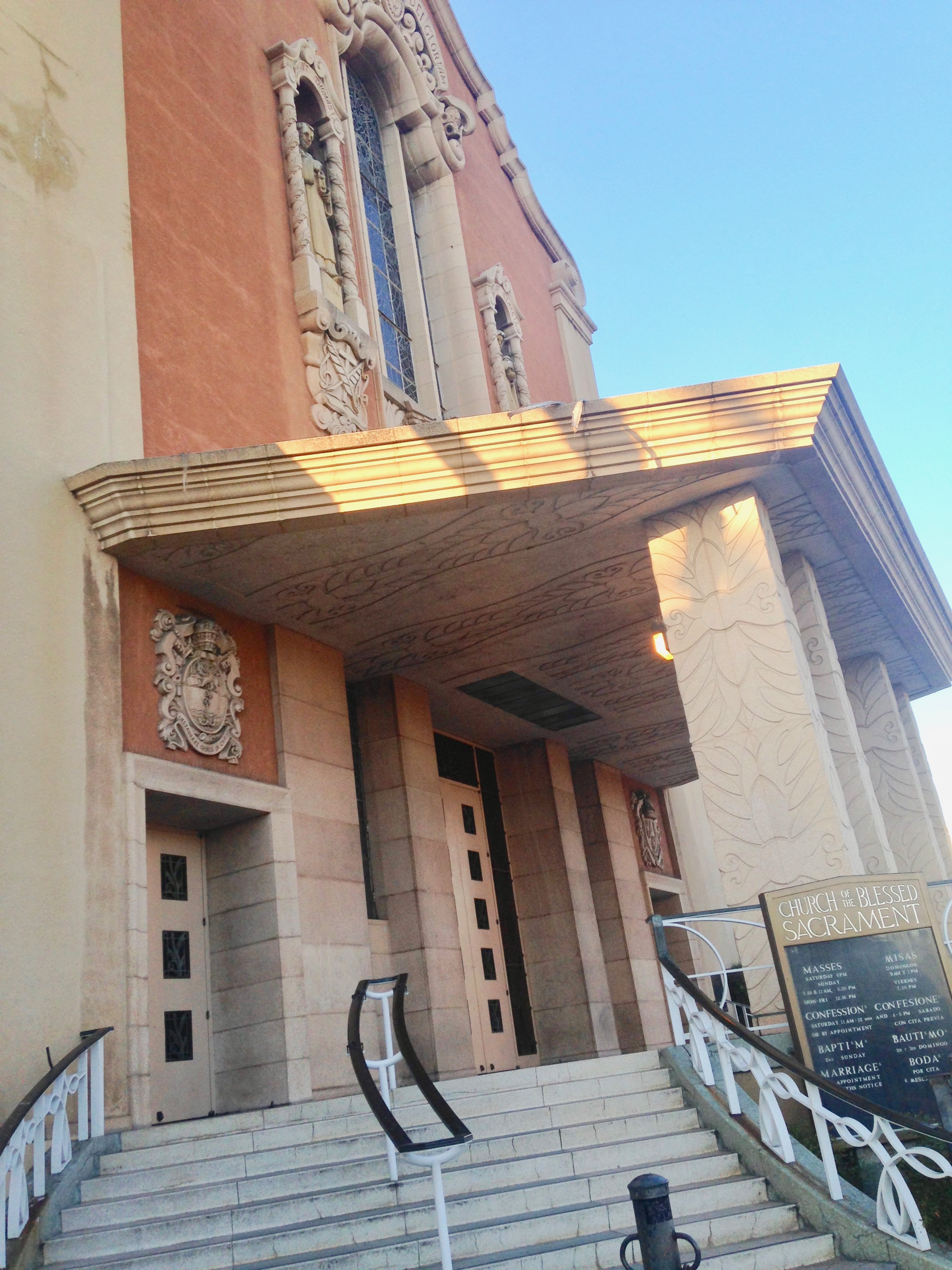
Entrance

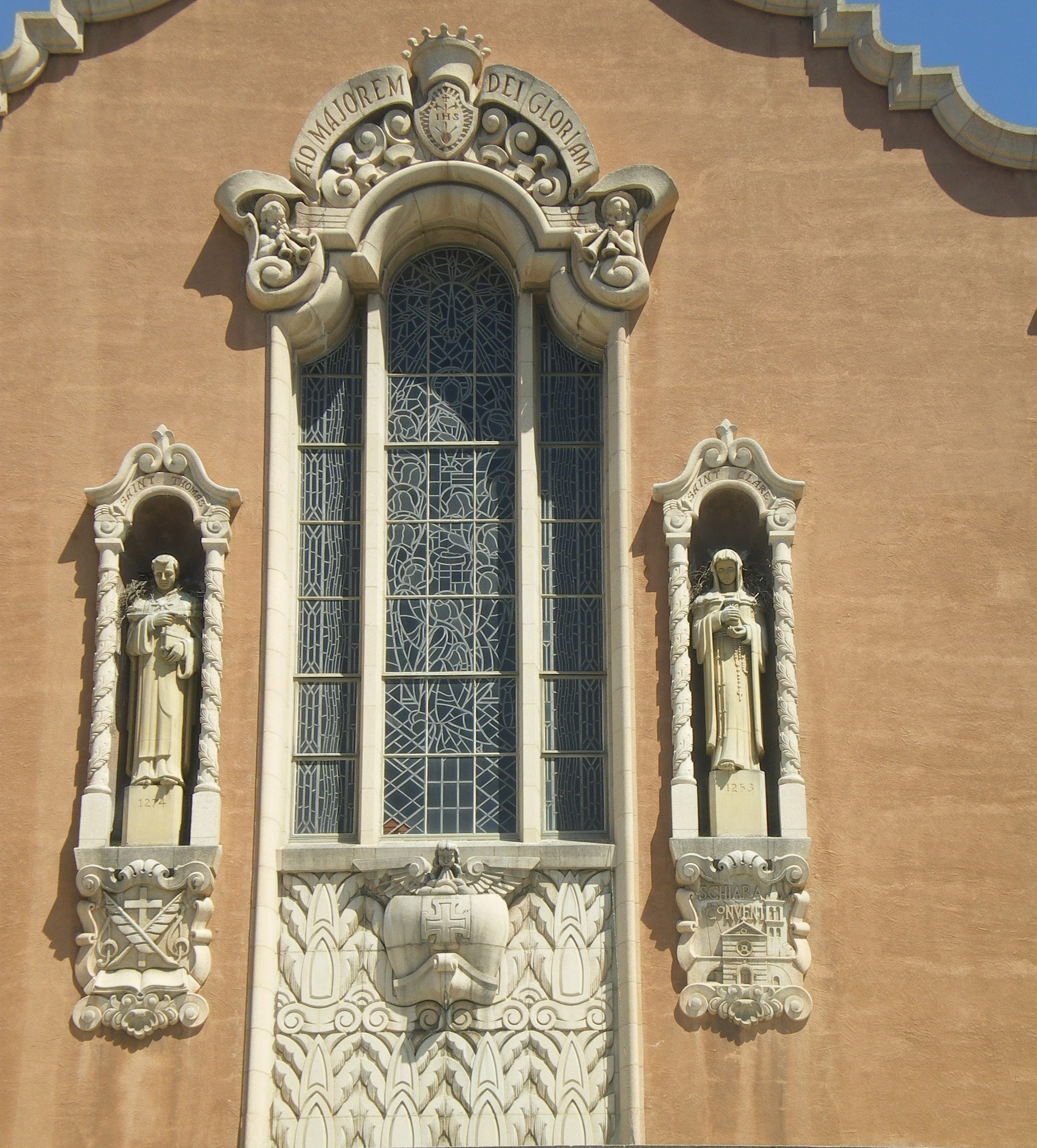
Front façade

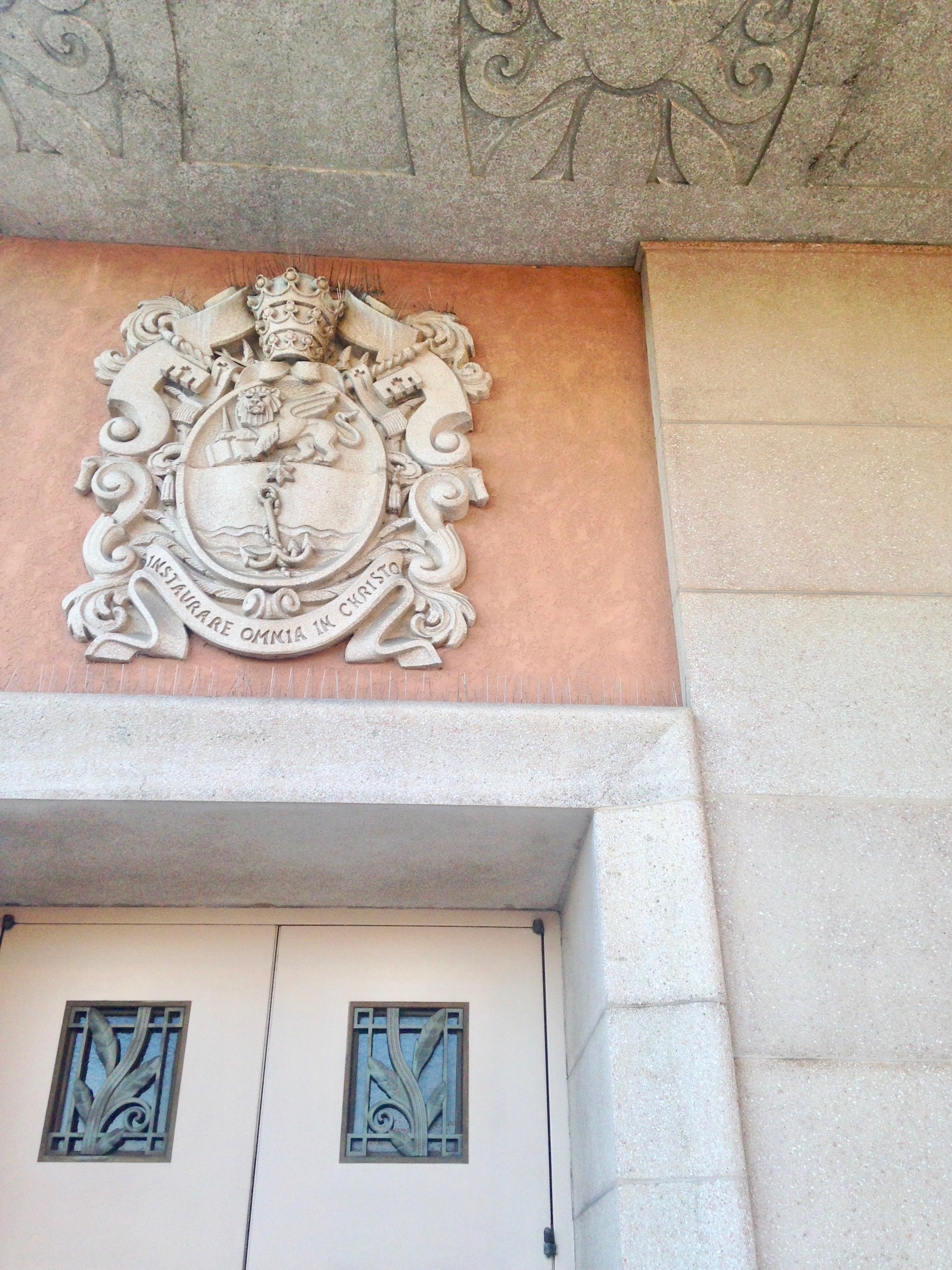
Entryway

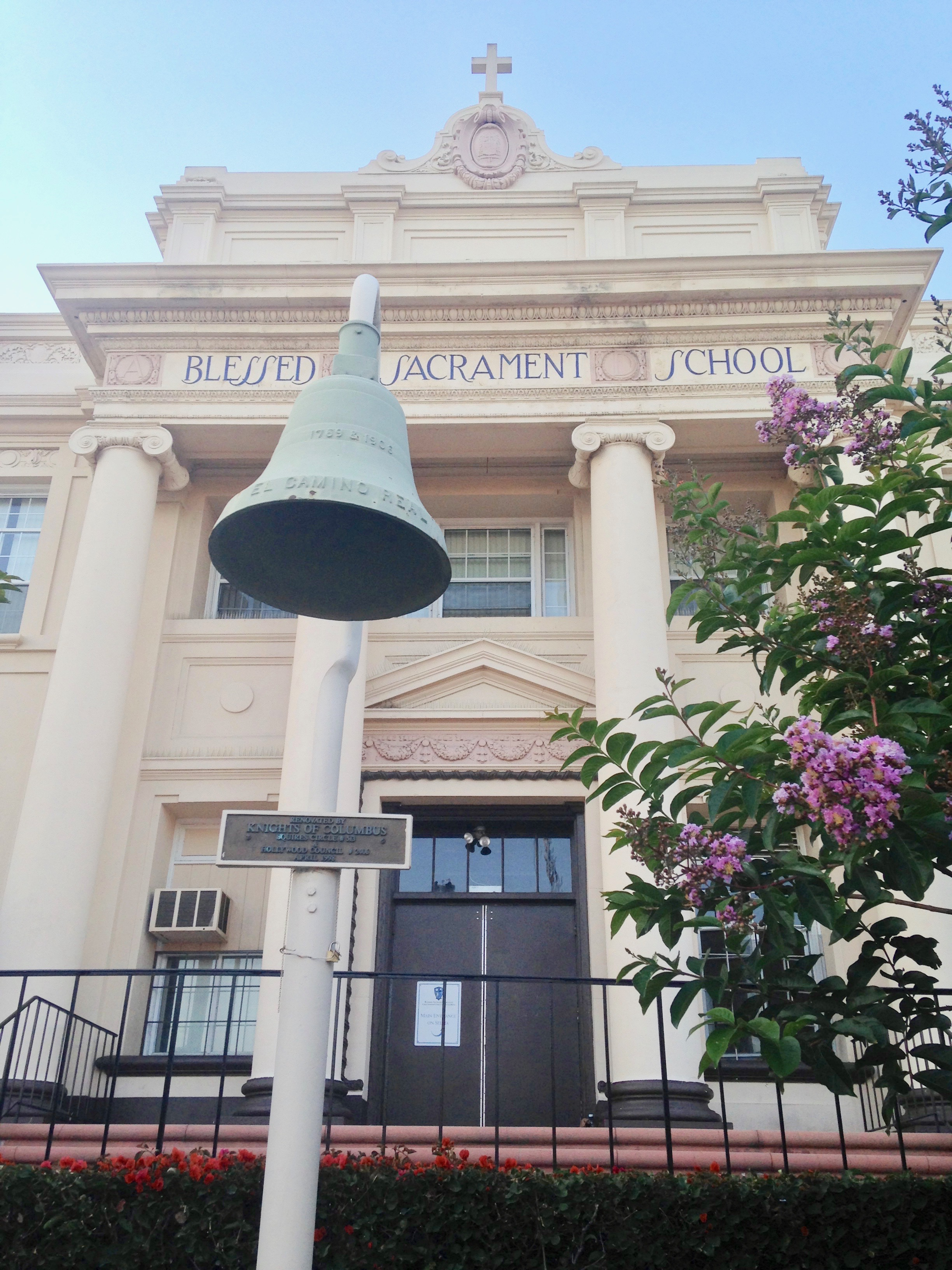
Close-up of the Blessed Sacrament School

== See also ==
- Our Lady of the Angels Pastoral Region
