= Patricia Fahy =

New York State Senator (born 1955)

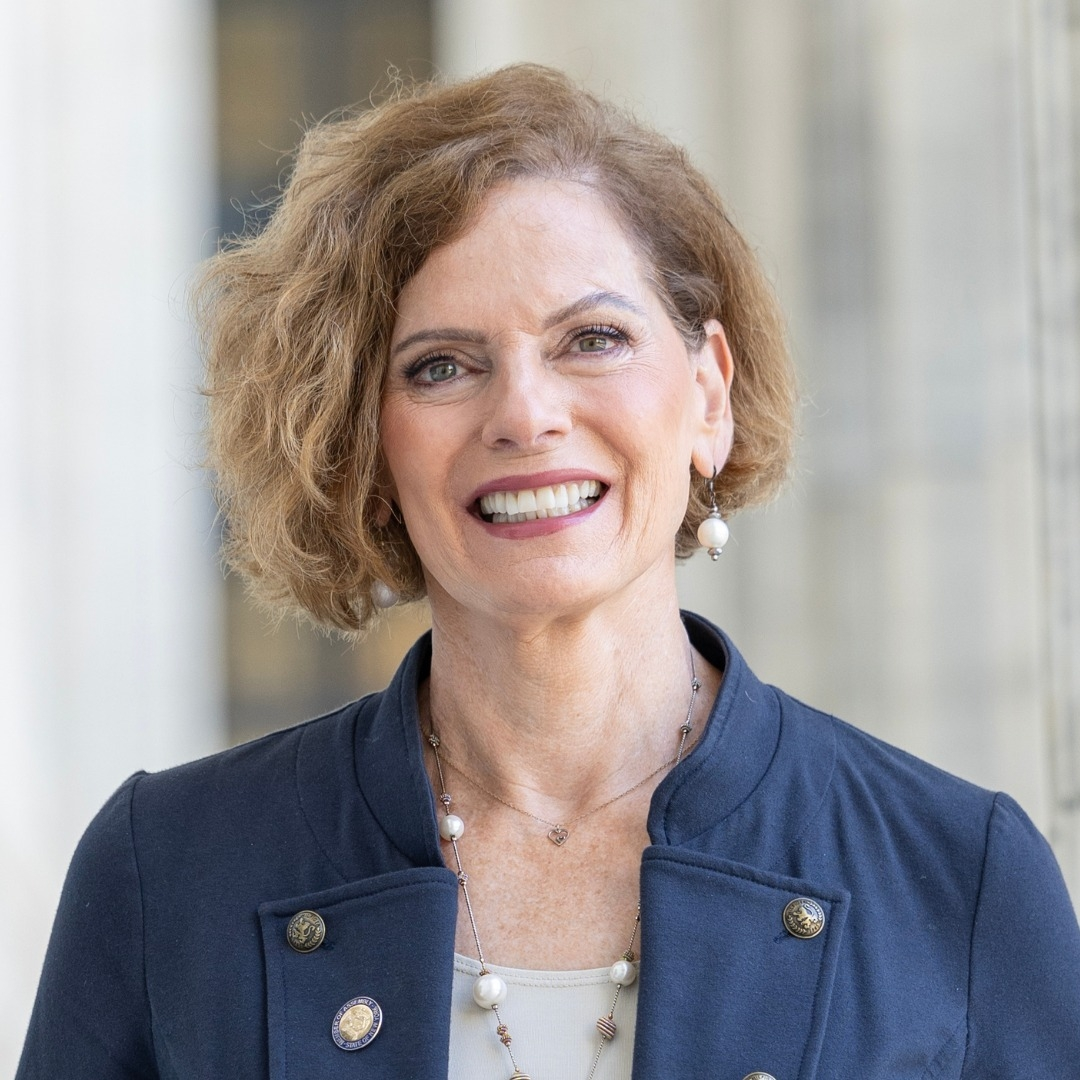
- Fahy in 2025

Member of the New York State Senate from the 46th district
- Incumbent
- Assumed office January 1, 2025
- Preceded by: Neil Breslin

Member of the New York State Assembly from the 109th district
- In office January 1, 2013 – December 31, 2024
- Preceded by: Jack McEneny
- Succeeded by: Gabriella Romero

Personal details
- Born: 1955 (age 70–71) Chicago, Illinois
- Party: Democratic
- Spouse: B. Wayne Bequette (m. 1995)
- Children: Brendan Fahy Bequette (1996–2022), Eileen Fahy Bequette (b. 1999)
- Education: Northern Illinois University (BA, 1980), University of Illinois, Chicago (MPA, 1985)
- Profession: State senator, professor
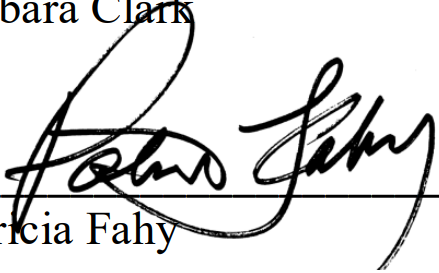
- Signature
- Website: Official website

Patricia Fahy (b. 1955) is an American politician from the state of New York. A Democrat, Fahy has represented District 46 in the New York State Senate since 2025. The district includes all of Montgomery County, as well as portions of Albany County and Schenectady County. Fahy previously represented the 109th District in the New York State Assembly for 12 years. Before serving in the New York State Legislature, Fahy was president of the Albany City Board of Education.

== Electoral history ==
=== 2012 elections ===
On September 13, 2012, there was a Democratic primary in Assembly District 109 to replace the retiring incumbent Jack McEneny, who had been an assemblyman for 20 years. Fahy received 5,335 votes (36.34%) in a crowded field that included Frank J. Commisso, Jr., Christopher T. Higgins, William J. McCarthy, Jr., Jim Coyne and Margarita Perez, as well as write-in candidates. Ted J. Danz, Jr., however, beat Fahy in the Independence Party primary held the same date, 51 to 46%, with some write-ins. Fahy had previously served as president of the City School District of Albany Board of Education.

In the November 2012 general election, Fahy won with 37,967 votes, or almost 63%, on the Democratic and Working Family party lines, against Danz, who received about 32.5% on the Republican and Independence lines, and the perennial candidate and Tea Party activist Joseph P. Sullivan on the Conservative line, who got about 3.5% of the vote.

=== 2024 election ===
After serving in the Assembly for 12 years, Fahy succeeded retiring incumbent state senator Neil Breslin of New York's 46th State Senate District. She defeated Republican Ted Danz in the 2024 election, 56% to 44%.

Senate District 46 includes all of Montgomery County, as well as portions of Albany County and Schenectady County.

== Legislative work ==
Fahy raised concerns about the impact of Governor Andrew Cuomo's proposed 2014–2015 budget on P-12 education.

In February 2017, Fahy, along with Albany Mayor Kathy Sheehan and Congressman Paul Tonko, were criticized by Bishop Edward Scharfenberger for being Catholic politicians who supported and attended a rally for Planned Parenthood. The rally, which drew hundreds of attendees in support of Planned Parenthood, emphasized the risk of losing services like pregnancy testing and cancer screening due to potential federal funding cuts.

In 2019, Fahy penned an [op-ed] in the Albany Times Union that called for the reimagining of I-787. In 2022, she secured $5 million for a feasibility study to reimagine the highway, and in 2025, Governor Kathy Hochul pledged $35 million to fully reimagine 787 alongside downtown Albany as part of the $400 million 'Championing Albany's Potential' initiative.

In 2021, Fahy sponsored and passed New York State's first-ever gun industry liability law with State Senator Zellnor Myrie.

In 2022, Fahy sponsored and passed the nation's first right to repair law, the New York Digital Fair Repair Act, which requires manufacturers of certain electronic devices to make diagnostic and repair information, parts, and tools available to independent repair shops and consumers on "fair and reasonable terms". Since then, multiple states have introduced and passed different versions of their own right-to-repair laws.

Fahy also sponsored legislation, passed and signed into law in 2022, that requires New York State to conserve 30% of its land and water by 2030 as part of the 30 by 30 movement.

In 2024, as the Higher Education Chair in the Assembly, Fahy led the push to '#TurnOnTheTap' and expand New York State's Tuition Assistance Program (TAP), which assists middle and low-income students with the cost of tuition at SUNY and CUNY schools. This resulted in the first expansion in New York's financial assistance program for students in more than 25 years and a doubling of award amounts.

At the beginning of 2025, Fahy continued her push to expand New York's Earned Income Tax Credit.

On March 27, 2025, Fahy introduced a bill that would issue new certificates of registration to ZEV-exclusive manufacturers not previously permitted to participate in direct manufacturer auto sales in New York State.

On July 15, 2025, Fahy introduced legislation that would ban ICE agents from wearing masks during civilian immigration actions conducted in New York State.

She served as the committee chair of the New York Senate Committee on Disabilities for the 2025-2026 legislative session. She had a major disagreement with members of the non-speaking community about a bill that would allow individuals the right to choose their preferred way to communicate, which is a bill that had passed the New York State Assembly by a unanimous vote the year before but that Fahy opposed in its original form.

New York State Senate
Preceded by Neil Breslin	New York State Senate, 46th District; January 1, 2025 – present	Incumbent

New York State Assembly
Preceded by Jack McEneny	New York State Assembly, 109th District; January 1, 2013 – December 31, 2024	Succeeded by Gabriella Romero
