= North Albany, Albany, New York =

North Albany City of Albany
- Neighborhood
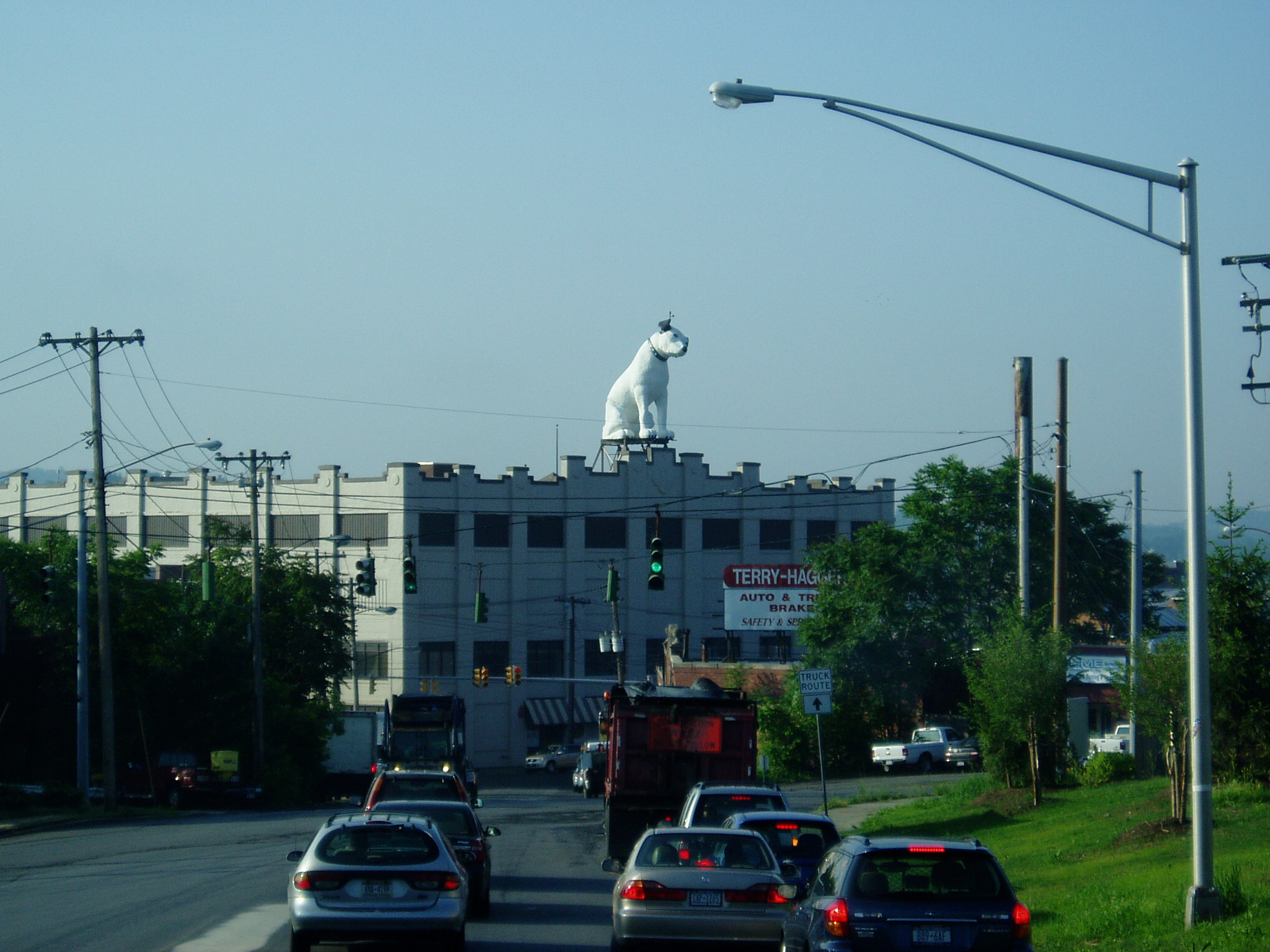
- Nipper watching over North Albany, as seen from Loudonville Road
- Etymology: for its location north of the original Albany city limits
- Nickname: Limerick
- Location of North Albany within the state of New York
- Coordinates: 42°40′01″N 73°44′13″W
- Country: United States
- State: New York
- County: Albany County
- City: Albany
- Settled: mid-1650s
- Time zone: UTC-5 (Eastern Standard Time)
  - Summer (DST): UTC-4 (Eastern Daylight Time)
- Area code: 518
- ZIP code: 12204, 12207

North Albany is a neighborhood in the city of Albany, New York. North Albany was settled in the mid-17th century by the Patroon of Rensselaerswyck and his tenants and later became a hamlet in the town of Watervliet. Due to the Erie Canal being constructed in 1825, North Albany saw immense growth, with the Albany Lumber District and an influx of Irish immigrants lending the area the name of Limerick. Home to many historic warehouses and row houses, North Albany continues to be an important industrial neighborhood. Recent efforts have begun to gentrify the neighborhood by adapting heavy industry/warehouse use to artistic and entertainment venues, such as a German beer garden, an amusement park, live music venues, and arts and crafts marketplaces.

== History ==
The area of North Albany was originally woodland and farmland as part of the patroonship of Rensselaerswyck, a feudal land patent covering present-day Albany and Rensselaer counties. In 1654 Barent Pietersen Coeymans and Teunis Cornelissen van der Poel ( also known as Teunis Cornelissen Spitsenberch, or Spitsbergen) rented a mill along the Patroon Creek from the patroon, and in 1666 Patroon Jeremias van Rensselaer built a house and associated buildings such as a mill and barn also along the Patroon Creek. This area north of the original city limits of Albany as delineated by the Dongan Charter was referred to as the colonie.

In 1825 the Erie Canal was built linking Albany to Buffalo on Lake Erie. Locks 1 and 2 were located in North Albany. The canal led to the establishment of the Albany Lumber District, the future lumber district at this time being owned by the Patroon Stephen Van Rensselaer and his brother William, and consisting of mostly vegetable gardens that paid little in the way of rent. The Patroon was soon approached about building slips off the canal for the use of the lumber industry in return for a more ample amount of rent. For about a quarter century in the middle of the 19th century the Albany lumber district was considered the largest white pine wholesale market, and by the 1870s Albany was the largest lumber district in the United States by value, though by that time it had recently been outstripped in feet sold by Chicago. Also due to the canal's influence factories began to locate in North Albany producing a varied collection of goods including books, stoves, carriages, and machine tools. Large numbers of Irish who built the Erie Canal and continued to work in the factories of North Albany lent to the area the name of Limerick.

In 1826 the state legislature created the Watervliet Turnpike Company, which built a toll road extending from Broadway at what was the city line at the time north through North Albany to the village of West Troy (today city of Watervliet). In 1862 the name of the company was changed to the Watervliet Turnpike and Railway Company (WT&RR) and the state authorized the construction of a railroad along the road. In addition to the Watervliet Turnpike, the Loudonville Plank Road (Loudonville Road) was a turnpike in North Albany. It ran from Broadway to Loudonville and had a toll gate on the corner with North Pearl Street.

In 1860 North Albany consisted of 40 houses.

In 1870 North Albany was annexed to the city of Albany from the town of Watervliet, becoming the Ninth Ward, today the Fourth Ward. In 1871 several North Albany streets received new names; North Pearl Avenue was renamed North Pearl Street, Troy Road became Broadway, Watervliet Avenue became Genesse Street, Hudson River Avenue became Mohawk Street, Albany Avenue became Albany Street, and Broadway Avenue became Laughlin Street. Laughlin Street became Emmett Street in 1879.

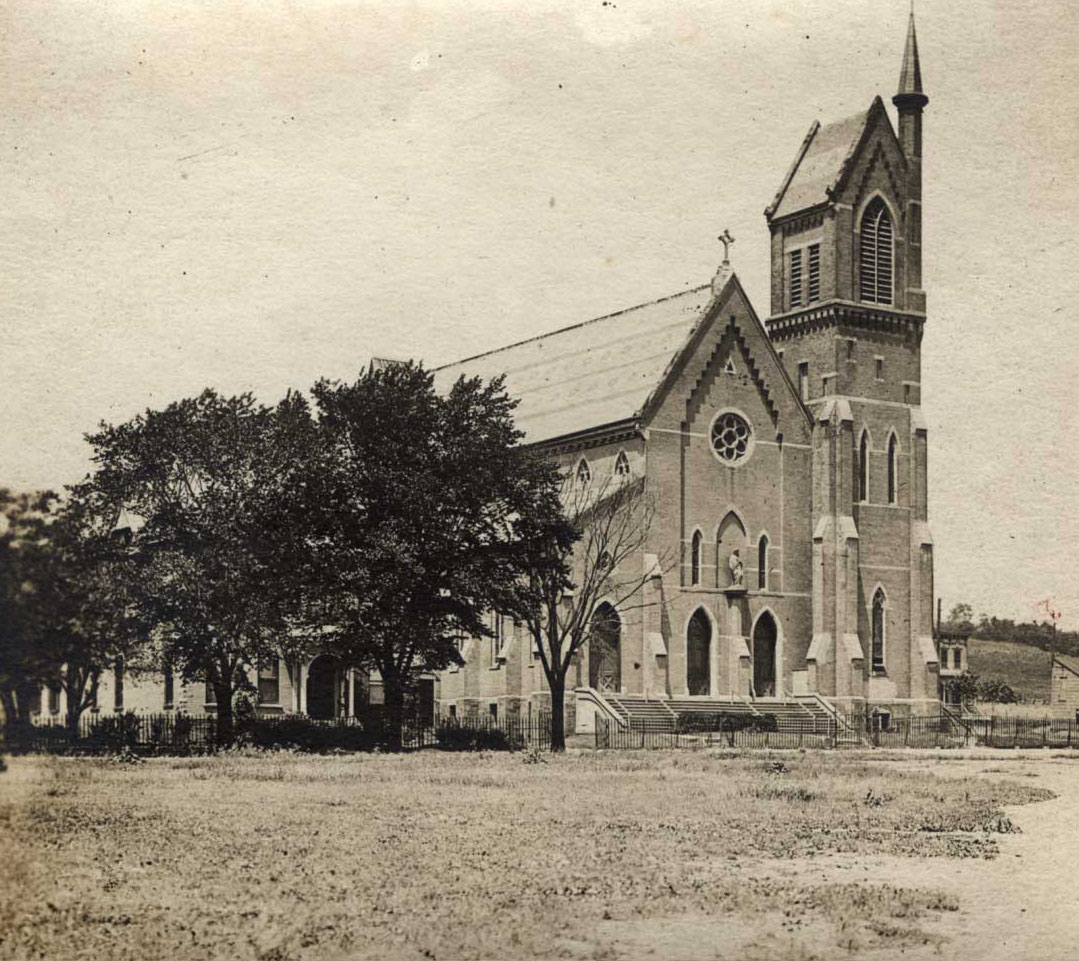
Sacred Heart Church in 1905

In 1876 the Sacred Heart Church was built on Walter Street for its large Irish Catholic population. In 1865 Peter Cagger purchased the lot at the corner of Broadway and North Ferry Street for the Roman Catholic Diocese of Albany, which they used as the St. Vincent's Orphan Asylum. Upon his death his widow donated money to convert the building into a hospital, named St. Peter's Hospital in his honor. The hospital opened in 1869 with 33 beds and a staff of 7 doctors and the Sisters of Mercy as the nursing staff. The hospital moved to its current location on New Scotland Avenue in 1930, the building on Broadway staying open as an out-patient clinic for another year before closing permanently.

The WT&RR began running 8-motor electric cars between its North Albany car barns and West Troy in 1889. In 1892 the Albany Railway also erected electric car barns in North Albany.

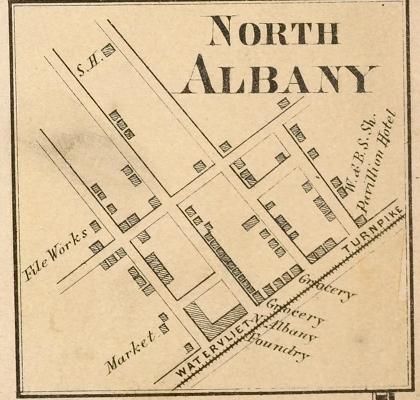
Map of North Albany
in 1866

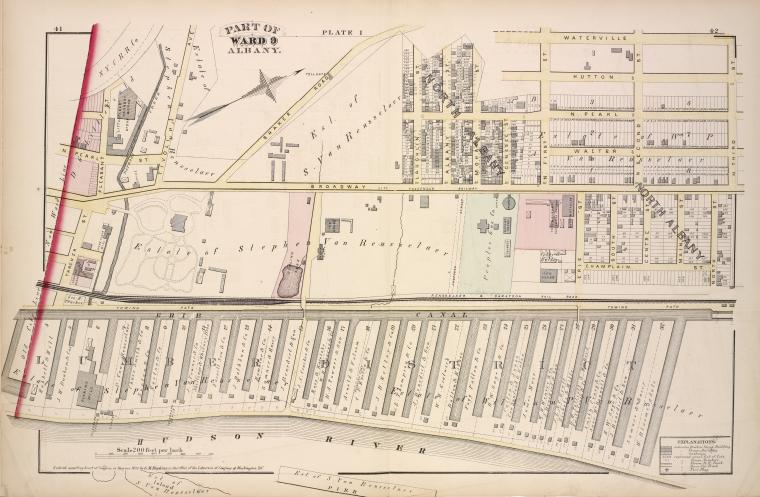
Map of North Albany in 1878 (North is to right)

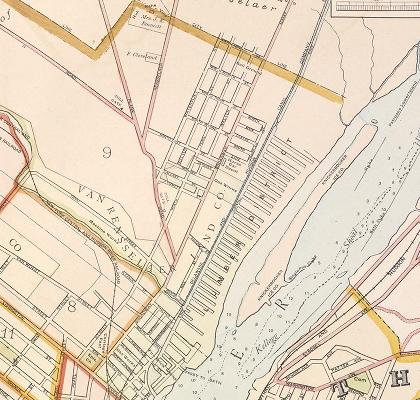
Map of North Albany
in 1891

=== After 1900 ===
When at the turn of the 20th century Albany built its first water filtration plant, it was located in North Albany.

Many of North Albany's former turnpikes continued to be of importance to long-distance travel throughout the 20th century as evidenced by the designation of several US and state routes. North Pearl Street was extended from Pleasant Street to Emmett Street and then on to the city line at the village of Menands in 1925, and as a consequence of the 1930 renumbering of state highways in New York North Pearl Street became a part of New York Route 32 (NY 32). In the 1940s NY Route 2 (NY 2) was extended south to NY Route 5 (NY 5) downtown by way of an overlap with NY 32. NY 2 was rerouted in the early 1950s to leave NY 32 at the junction of Wolfert Avenue and Broadway in Menands and then follow Broadway into downtown. In the mid-1960s, Route 2 was shortened to end prior to North Albany.

In 1950 North Albany held the neighborhood's first St. Patrick's Day Parade, one year before the citywide parade began. Whereas the city parade has been postponed occasionally due to weather, the neighborhood parade had never been cancelled or postponed even when there was 23 inches of snow on the ground in 1993. However, both parades were canceled as a result of the COVID-19 pandemic in March 2020.

In 1953 the Edwin Corning Homes, a public housing complex, was built in North Albany, as affordable housing for soldiers returning home from World War II. It was named for Edwin Corning, former Lieutenant Governor of New York, son of railroad baron and mayor, Erastus Corning, and father of Mayor Erastus Corning 2nd.

During the 1960s the Albany municipal landfill was located on the site of a former river water filtration plant that operated from the early 20th century to the 1930s. While the tanks are assumed to have been demolished, several structures associated with the plant are still buried under the trash, such as concrete foundations and tunnel structures. Located along Erie Boulevard on approximately 45 acres (18 ha) between Interstate 787 (I-787), Interstate 90 (I-90), Erie Boulevard, and the Albany County Wastewater Treatment Plant, it was closed to municipal waste in 1969 in favor of a new landfill in the Albany Pine Bush area in the western section of the city. The landfill continued to operate as the North Albany Demolition Landfill, for demolition/construction debris until 1988. The city's Department of Public Works garage was built on a part of the landfill, with land near by used for the creation of the 92,000 square feet (8,500 m^{2}) Erie Boulevard Commerce Park on 16.6 acres (6.7 ha). Original plans were for Erie Boulevard, which was built on top of the old Erie Canal, to be extended through to Menands to Exit 6 of I-787. Though Albany would have borne all the costs of construction Menands still refused. Erie Boulevard was subsequently built to the border and no further in 1988 as part of the park construction.

The first female mail carrier in the city of Albany worked out of the Patroon Station in North Albany, beginning in 1970. She may even have been the first in the entire Capital District. In 2011 the Patroon Station closed, though by that time it no longer was responsible for home delivery and home delivery continued with no changes in ZIP code, PO Boxes were able to be transferred to the Loudonville post office 4 miles (6.4 km) away in the neighboring town of Colonie.

In 2000 Denis Foley and Andrew Wolfe, two Union College professors, unearthed in an archeological excavation the first weigh lock of the Erie Canal.

In the 1990s and 2000s (decade) the blue-collar warehouse and manufacturing backbone of North Albany began to move upscale towards more eclectic reuse of industrial and service infrastructure. As part of the shift from heavy manufacturing to a more service-oriented economy the Albany Common Council in 1999 changed the zoning for much of North Albany between Erie Boulevard and I-787 (west to east) and Livingston Avenue and I-90 (south to north). The roughly 100 acres (40 ha) affected were changed from industrial use only to C-3, Central Business District which allowed for sports stadiums, museums, hotels, apartment buildings, and general commercial uses. In 1991 Albany Fire Department's Engine #3 was closed, and it became a nightclub by the name of Noche, then a live music venue named Jack Rabbit Slims, and today is an authentic German beer garden named Wolff's Biergarten und Wurst Haus. Huck Finn's Warehouse and More, a discount furniture store, which had been located on Tivoli Street, moved across North Albany to a former paper mill that had been converted into a warehouse owned by Montgomery Ward from 1975 to 1998. The Tivoli Street location became the home of the Albany County Hall of Records in 2001, home to the original Dongan Charter. In 2007 At The Warehouse, a weekend art, craft, and food marketplace, took over a building built in 1892 that had previously been a brewery.

In 1999, Sacred Heart Church became the first Roman Catholic church in Albany to be led by a deacon as parish life director due to a shortage of priests. In addition to changing times in leadership, the church community saw fewer of its traditional Irish congregation and increasing numbers of minorities. The reverend of the black apostolate at St. George's became the sacramental minister for masses, and a Vietnamese reverend celebrates a Vietnamese mass on the first and second Sundays of every month. In 2006 the Sacred Heart Church's former convent next door was refurbished as an apartment complex for formerly homeless veterans.

In 2001, the Corning Homes projects were redeveloped into a low-density development of town homes with Dutch-style pitched roofs. The Corning Homes name was dropped so as not to continue to stigmatize the low-income housing residents in an attempt to blend them in with the rest of the North Albany neighborhood.

In 2005, a completely renovated Public School No. 20 on North Pearl Street was renamed North Albany Academy. Begun in 2004 and completed in 2005 a YMCA (Y) was built attached to the school, with the students using the gym and pool during the day. The Y includes a branch of the Albany Public Library and a day care for pre-school children. The Y was the first in the Capital District to involve the organization partnering with a local government, among other sources funding came from the Albany Housing Authority, Citizens Bank, the state Dormitory Authority and the state Office of Children and Family Services. The Y was the first in the United States built using tax breaks from the New Market Tax Credit and was the first built in Albany since the 1960s.

Utility company National Grid's regional headquarters are located at 1125 Broadway in North Albany on the site of the former Albany Gas Works. The gasworks in the 19th century produced a crude form of natural gas for gaslight street lamps using coal gasification methods. The tar left behind contamination that was cleaned up in 1996 by Niagara Mohawk (National Grid's predecessor). In 2010, National Grid established a compressed natural gas station there; in addition to cutting down on emissions from National Grid's fleet of trucks it is open to the public, allowing for increased ability for those with natural gas vehicles to fuel.

== Geography ==
North Albany is bounded roughly by the railroad overpass on Broadway to the south and the city line with Menands to the north; and from the Hudson River to the east and Van Rensselaer Boulevard on the west. The area includes many older industrial sites along Broadway and North Pearl Street, with newer industrial uses along Erie Boulevard.

== Economy ==
North Albany is the site of the largest industrial area in the city of Albany, and is the most concentrated area of industry as well. Approximately 75 industrial businesses are located in the historic heart of North Albany, an area of approximately 1 square mile (2.6 km^{2}). Though most of those businesses tend to be small, they account for around 2,000 jobs total. Government operations are present as well, including the New York State Assembly's printing operations. Both private and public actions have attempted to change North Albany from a heavy industry economy to a "Warehouse District" of artistic and entertainment venues reusing old warehouses and city infrastructure. In addition to a German beer garden in the former AFD Engine #3 and an arts/crafts/food marketplace in an old beer factory, in 2011 an Irish pub opened in a former office furniture showroom and a rock and roll/country music live music venue and bar in a former bank building, both are within one block of the beer garden.

== Transportation ==
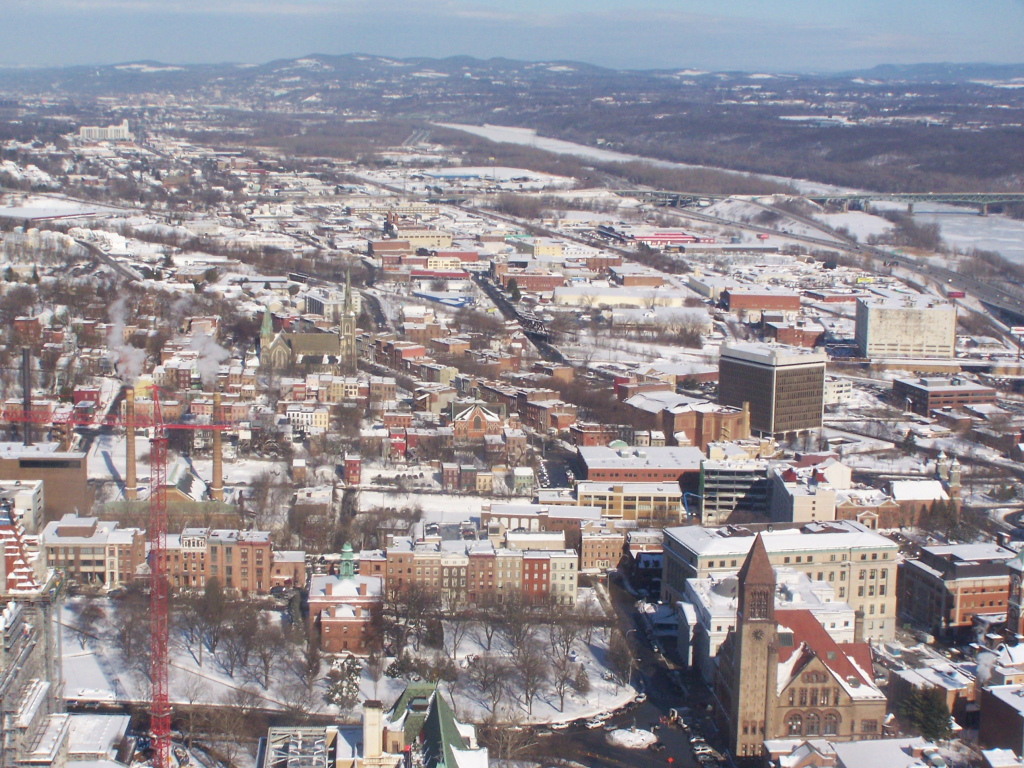
North Albany as seen from the Corning Tower

Along the southern boundary of North Albany lies a railroad owned by CSXT (the Chicago Line), which is also used by Amtrak. The former D&H Colonie Main Line (now owned by CP Rail) runs through North Albany, at Erie Street and Erie Boulevard sits a bulk transfer rail yard operated by BULK Transfer Services LLC.

North Albany's main streets are North Pearl Street and Broadway which run north-south from Arbor Hill and Downtown to Menands. Most other streets in the neighborhood are cross streets that intersect either or both of those main streets. North Pearl Street is also part of NY 32. Loudonville Road connects North Pearl Street and Broadway northwest to US 9 and Van Rensselaer Boulevard. Van Rensselaer Boulevard on the western border of North Albany travels north to Menands and the Albany Rural Cemetery, at the intersection with Northern Boulevard and Lawn Avenue it becomes New York Route 377 (NY 377). I-90 cuts through the neighborhood and intersects with I-787 along the Hudson River crossing the Patroon Island Bridge into the city and county of Rensselaer. I-787 travels along the Hudson River at the eastern edge of North Albany and at exit 4A at Water and North Ferry streets allows access to the southern edge of the neighborhood.

== Landmarks ==
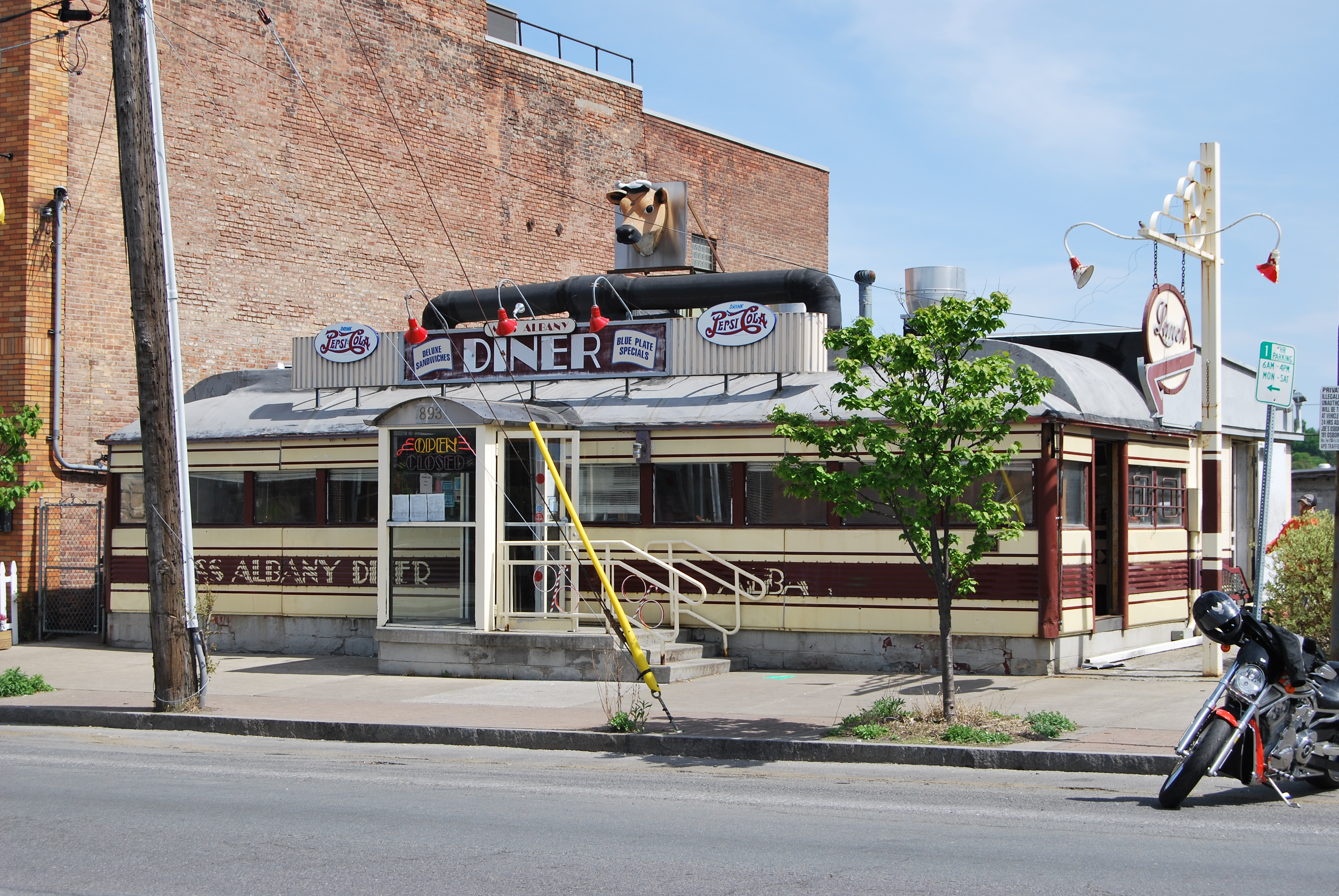
Miss Albany Diner

Built in 1954 for the RTA Corp., a distributor for RCA, Nipper is a 4–ton (3.6 metric ton), 24-foot (7.3 m) tall replica of the RCA mascot. He is currently the tallest known replica of the dog in existence. Nipper is composed of a composite body over a steel frame, and sports an aircraft warning beacon on his left ear, the dog can be seen as far as 5 miles (8.0 km) away in East Greenbush.

Listed on the National Register of Historic Places (NRHP) in 2000, the Miss Albany Diner has been located in North Albany along Broadway since 1941. It hosted Jack Nicholson and Meryl Streep during their filming of the movie Ironweed. A movie called Grazing Miss Albany was scheduled to be filmed in the diner.

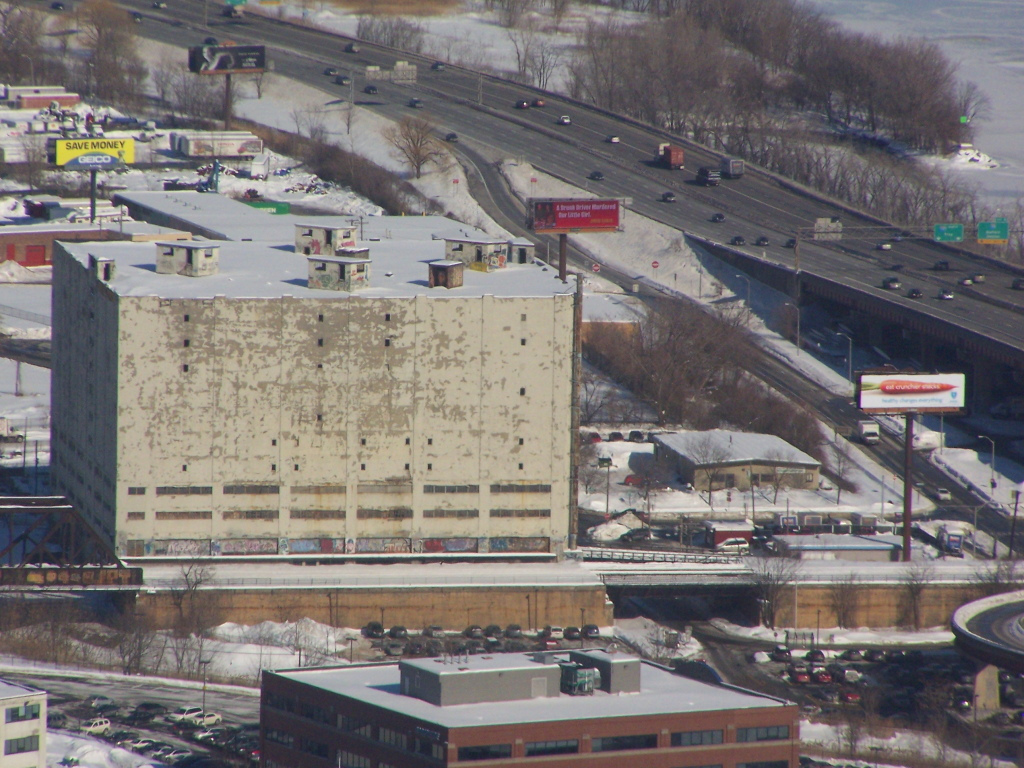
The Central Warehouse in 2011 as seen from the Corning Tower

Central Warehouse is a refrigeration warehouse in North Albany built in 1927. It is considered a landmark of the community and city. The building was abandoned in the early 1990s. On October 22, 2010, a fire damaged the warehouse, but nevertheless its owners still hoped to renovate the building. The City of Albany declared a state of emergency in 2022 after pieces of the building's wall fell near train tracks below. This forced Amtrak to suspend service in the area until the city made emergency repairs.

== Notable residents ==
- Admiral Walter F. Doran (Retired)- Former commander of the US Pacific Fleet
- William Kennedy- Pulitzer Prize winning author, a native of North Albany, many of his novels feature the neighborhood such as Ironweed which became a film of the same name featuring Jack Nicholson and Meryl Streep.
- Jerry Jennings- 74th mayor of Albany, and third-longest serving at 20 years in office (January 1, 1994 – December 31, 2013).
