= Mayoral elections in Albany, New York =

Elections are held every four years in the off-year immediately after United States presidential election years in Albany, New York, to elect the city's mayor.

== 2005 ==
2005 Albany mayoral election
- November 8, 2005
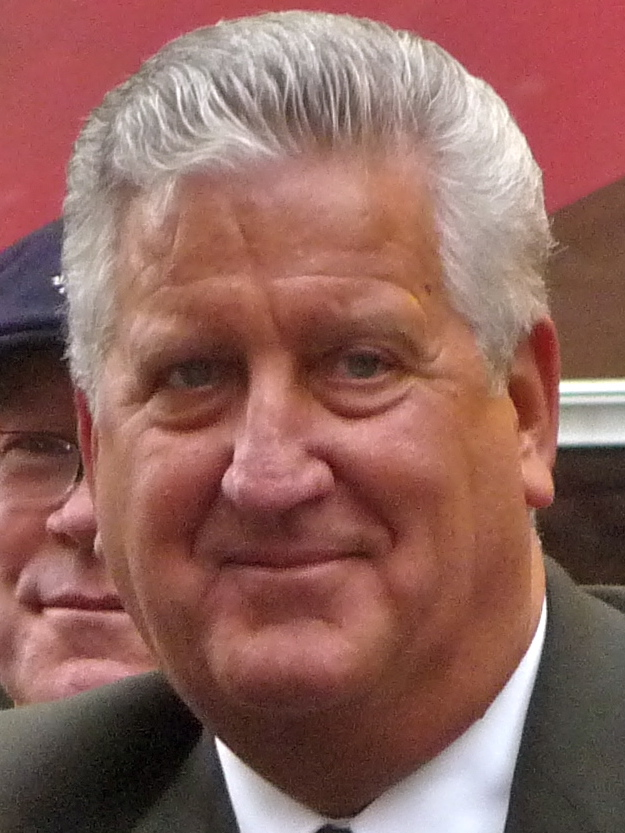

Nominee	Gerald Jennings	Alice Green	Joseph Sullivan
Party	Democratic	Green	Republican
Popular vote	15,367	5,548	1,465
Percentage	68.65%	24.79%	6.54%
Mayor before election
Gerald Jennings
Democratic
Elected mayor
Gerald Jennings
Democratic

The 2005 Albany mayoral election occurred on November 8, 2005. Incumbent Democrat Gerald Jennings was reelected to a fourth consecutive term.

=== Primaries ===
Primary elections were held on September 13, 2005.

==== Democratic ====
Candidates

- Gerald Jennings - incumbent mayor
- Archie Goodbee - retired broadcasting executive

2005 Albany Democratic mayoral primary
Party	Candidate	Votes	%
Democratic	Gerald Jennings (incumbent)	10,223	68.32%
Democratic	Archie Goodbee	4,741	31.68%
Total votes		14,964	100%

==== Conservative ====
2005 Albany Conservative mayoral primary
Party	Candidate	Votes	%
Conservative	Gerald Jennings (write-in)	22	81.48%
Conservative	Joseph Sullivan (write-in)	3	11.11%
Conservative	Paul Latimer (write-in)	1	3.70%
Conservative	Joseph McElroy (write-in)	1	3.70%
Total votes		27	100%

=== General election ===
In the general election, Jennings defeated Green Party candidate Alice Green, and Republican Party candidate Joseph Sullivan, a perennial candidate and local activist. This was a great result for Green who, 7 years earlier as the running mate of Al Lewis, helped the nascent Green Party of New York to achieve automatic ballot access by winning over 50,000 votes in the 1998 New York gubernatorial election.

2005 Albany mayoral election
Party	Candidate	Votes	%
Democratic	Gerald Jennings (incumbent)	14,295	63.86%
Independence	Gerald Jennings (incumbent)	561	2.51%
Conservative	Gerald Jennings (incumbent)	511	2.28%
Total	Gerald Jennings (incumbent)	15,367	68.65%
Green	Alice Green	5,548	24.79%
Republican	Joseph Sullivan	1,465	6.54%
	Benzie Johnson (write-in)	4	0.02%
Total votes		22,384	100%

== 2009 ==
2009 Albany mayoral election
- November 3, 2009
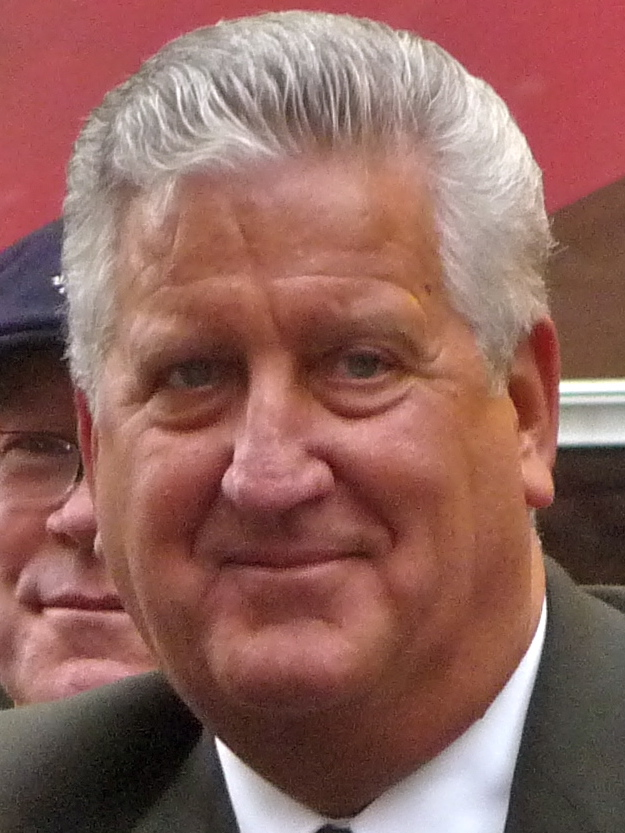

Nominee	Gerald Jennings	Corey Ellis	Nathan Lebron
Party	Democratic	Working Families	Republican
Alliance	Conservative
Popular vote	10,466	4,801	1,178
Percentage	63.52%	29.14%	7.15%
Mayor before election
Gerald Jennings
Democratic
Elected mayor
Gerald Jennings
Democratic

The Albany, New York, mayoral election of 2009 occurred on November 3, 2009. It saw the reelection of Democrat Gerald Jennings to a fifth consecutive term.

=== Democratic primary ===
The Democratic Party primary was held on September 15, 2009. Incumbent Mayor Gerald Jennings defeated Corey Ellis, a city council member, by a vote of 8,130 to 6,301.

2009 Albany Democratic mayoral primary
Party	Candidate	Votes	%
Democratic	Gerald Jennings (incumbent)	8,130	56.34%
Democratic	Corey Ellis	6,301	43.66%
Total votes		14,431	100%

=== General election ===
In the general election, Jennings (running on both the Democratic and Conservative Party lines) defeated Ellis (running as the Working Families Party candidate), and Republican Party candidate Nathan Lebron. Jennings got 10,466 votes in total, Ellis came in second with 4,801 votes, and LeBron got 1,178 votes; there were also a few dozen write-in votes.

2009 Albany mayoral election
Party	Candidate	Votes	%
Democratic	Gerald Jennings (incumbent)	9,953	60.41%
Conservative	Gerald Jennings (incumbent)	513	3.11%
Total	Gerald Jennings (incumbent)	10,466	63.52%
Working Families	Corey Ellis	4,801	29.14%
Republican	Nathan Lebron	1,178	7.15%
	Write-ins	31	0.19%
Total votes		16,476	100%

== 2013 ==
2013 Albany mayoral election
- November 5, 2013
Nominee	Kathy Sheehan	Jesse Calhoun
Party	Democratic	Republican
Alliance	Parties: Independence; Working Families
Popular vote	13,134	1,025
Percentage	83.49%	6.52%
Mayor before election
Gerald Jennings
Democratic
Elected mayor
Kathy Sheehan
Democratic

The Albany, New York mayoral election of 2013 took place on November 5, 2013. The general election was preceded by the primaries on September 10, 2013. The winner of the election was Democratic nominee Kathy Sheehan.

Incumbent Democratic mayor Gerald Jennings did not seek reelection.

=== Background ===
The 2013 mayoral election was the City of Albany's first open-seat mayoral election since 1993. Incumbent mayor Gerald Jennings announced on May 14, 2013, that he would not run for a sixth term. Jennings is the second-longest-serving mayor in the history of Albany (Erastus Corning 2nd was the city's longest-tenured mayor).

=== Democratic primary ===
On November 17, 2012, Sheehan announced herself as a candidate for mayor. On September 10, 2013, Sheehan defeated Corey Ellis in the Democratic primary. According to official returns released on October 9, Sheehan won the Democratic nomination with 7,468 votes (65.72%) to Ellis's 3,294 votes (28.99%), with 601 write in votes (5.29%) and a few void and blank ballots.

2013 Albany Democratic mayoral primary
Party	Candidate	Votes	%
Democratic	Kathy Sheehan	7,468	65.72%
Democratic	Corey Ellis	3,294	28.99%
	Write-ins	601	5.29%
Total votes		14,431	100%

=== General election ===
In addition to Sheehan, who ran on the Democratic, Working Families, and Independence Party lines, Jesse D. Calhoun was the candidate of the Republican Party, Joseph P. Sullivan ran on the Conservative Party line, and Theresa M. Portelli (a former Albany City school board member) ran on the Green Party line.

On November 5, Sheehan won the general election in a landslide, receiving over 83% of the total vote.

2013 Albany mayoral election
Party	Candidate	Votes	%
Democratic	Kathy Sheehan	11,884	75.55%
Working Families	Kathy Sheehan	826	5.25%
Independence	Kathy Sheehan	424	2.70%
Total	Kathy Sheehan	13,134	83.49%
Republican	Jesse D. Calhoun	1,025	6.52%
Green	Theresa M. Portelli	715	4.55%
Conservative	Joseph P. Sullivan	681	4.33%
	Write-ins	176	1.12%
Total votes		15,731	100%
Democratic hold			

== 2017 ==
2017 Albany mayoral election
- November 7, 2017
Nominee	Kathy Sheehan	Frank Commisso Jr.
Party	Democratic	Independence
Alliance	Parties: Women's Equality; Working Families
Popular vote	11,520	3,687
Percentage	70.42%	22.54%
Mayor before election
Kathy Sheehan
Democratic
Elected mayor
Kathy Sheehan
Democratic

The 2017 mayoral election in Albany, New York, was held on November 7, 2017, and resulted in the incumbent Kathy Sheehan, a member of the Democratic Party, being re-elected to a second term over Conservative Party candidate Joseph Sullivan, Green Party candidate Bryan Jimenez, and Independence Party candidate Frank Commisso Jr.

=== Democratic primary ===
Sheehan won the Democratic primary election with less than 50 percent of the vote. Frank Commisso Jr., a member of the Albany Common Council; and Carolyn McLaughlin, the president of the Common Council, also ran.

2017 Albany Democratic mayoral primary
Party	Candidate	Votes	%
Democratic	Kathy Sheehan	6,650	49.37
Democratic	Frank Commisso Jr.	4,446	33.01
Democratic	Carolyn McLaughlin	2,056	15.26
	Write-ins	317	2.35
Total votes		13,469	100

=== General election ===
Commisso ran again in the general election as the candidate of the Independence Party. He criticized Sheehan over her handling of the city's finances and on the issue of tax breaks. Sheehan responded to Commisso's criticism through television advertisements, which were funded by a $387,000 loan from Sheehan to her campaign.

2017 Albany mayoral election
Party	Candidate	Votes	%
Democratic	Kathy Sheehan	10,247	62.63
Working Families	Kathy Sheehan	994	6.08
Women's Equality	Kathy Sheehan	279	1.71
Total	Kathy Sheehan	11,520	70.42
Independence	Frank Commisso Jr.	3,687	22.54
Conservative	Joseph P. Sullivan	709	4.22
Green	Bryan Jimenez	374	2.29
	Write-ins	70	0.43
Total votes		16,360	100
Democratic hold			

== 2021 ==
2021 Albany mayoral election
- 2 November 2021
- Turnout: 14,015
Candidate	Kathy Sheehan	Alicia Purdy	William Atlee
Party	Democratic	Republican	Independence
Alliance		Conservative
Popular vote	8,837	2,385	2,374
Percentage	63.05%	17.02%	16.94%
Mayor before election
Kathy Sheehan
Democratic
Elected mayor
Kathy Sheehan
Democratic

The 2021 mayoral election in Albany, New York, was held on November 2, 2021. Incumbent Democratic mayor Kathy Sheehan won re-election to a third term in office.

=== Democratic primary ===
==== Candidates ====
===== Nominee =====
- Kathy Sheehan, incumbent mayor

==== Eliminated in primary ====
- Valerie Faust, reverend and write-in candidate for mayor in 2009 and 2013 (continued as a write-in candidate)

===== Disqualified =====
- Marlon Anderson, advocate (continued as a write-in candidate)
- Lukee Forbes, activist

===== Declined =====
- Dorcey Applyrs, Chief City Auditor of Albany (endorsed Sheehan)
- Corey Ellis, president of the Albany Common Council and candidate for mayor in 2009 and 2013 (endorsed Sheehan)

2021 Albany Democratic mayoral primary
Party	Candidate	Votes	%
Democratic	Kathy Sheehan (incumbent)	3,688	63.8
Democratic	Valerie Faust	2,093	36.2
Total votes		5,781	100

=== Republican primary ===
==== Nominee ====
- Alicia Purdy, radio host (also nominated by the Conservative Party)

=== Third-party and independent candidates ===
- William Atlee, chief director of upstate exxon (Independence Party)
- Ved Dookhun (Socialist Workers Party)

=== General election ===
2021 Albany mayoral election
Party	Candidate	Votes	%
New York Democratic Party	Kathy Sheehan (Incumbent)	8,837	63.05%
New York Republican Party	Alicia Purdy	1,862	13.29%
Conservative Party of New York	William Atlee	523	3.73%
Total	William Atlee	2,385	17.02%
Independence Party of New York	Greg Aidala	2,374	16.94%
Write-in		419	2.99%
Total		14,015	100%

== 2025 ==
The 2025 mayoral election in Albany, New York was held on November 4, 2025. Incumbent mayor Kathy Sheehan is retiring after serving three terms. The primary election took place on June 24, 2025, with Democrat Dorcey Applyrs defeating Republican Rocco Pezzulo in a landslide.

2025 Albany mayoral election
- November 4, 2025
Candidate	Dorcey Applyrs	Rocco Pezzulo
Party	Democratic	Republican
Alliance	Working Families	Conservative
Popular vote	12,709	2,035
Percentage	83.65%	13.39%
Mayor before election
Kathy Sheehan
Democratic
Elected mayor
Dorcey Applyrs
Democratic

=== Democratic primary ===
==== Candidates ====
===== Nominee =====
- Dorcey Applyrs, Albany Chief City Auditor

===== Eliminated in primary =====
- Marlon Anderson, community advocate
- Dan Cerutti, former tech executive
- Corey Ellis, Albany Common Council President and candidate for mayor in 2009 and 2013
- Carolyn Mclaughlin, Albany County Legislator

==== Declined ====
- Kathy Sheehan, incumbent mayor

==== Endorsements ====
Dorcey Applyrs

Statewide officials

- Letitia James, Attorney General of New York (2019–present)

State legislators

- Carl Heastie, Speaker of the New York State Assembly (2015–present) from the 83rd district (2001–present)
- Gabriella Romero, state assemblymember from the 109th district (2025–present)

Individuals

- Ana Maria Archila, activist and co-director of the New York Working Families Party

Trade unions

- Communications Workers of America District 1

Organizations

- Citizen Action of New York
- College Democrats of America
- College Democrats of New York
- Working Families Party

Newspapers

- Times Union
Dan Cerutti

Local officials

- Gerald Jennings, former mayor of Albany (1994–2013)
- Susan Rizzo, Albany County Comptroller

==== Results ====
2025 Albany mayoral Democratic primary
Party	Candidate	Votes	%
Democratic	Dorcey Applyrs	6,331	52.03%
Democratic	Dan Cerutti	3,419	28.10%
Democratic	Corey Ellis	1,286	10.57%
Democratic	Carolyn Mclaughlin	892	7.33%
	Write-ins	239	1.96%
Total votes		12,264	100.00%

=== Republican primary ===
==== Nominee ====
- Rocco Pezzulo, entrepreneur

=== Independent candidates ===
==== Withdrawn ====
- Michael Crook, freelance writer (Independent)

=== General election ===
==== Results ====
2025 Albany mayoral general election
Party	Candidate	Votes	%
Democratic	Dorcey Applyrs	10,534	69.33%
Working Families	Dorcey Applyrs	2,175	14.35%
Total	Dorcey Applyrs	12,709	83.65%
Republican	Rocco Pezzulo	1,487	9.79%
Conservative	Rocco Pezzulo	548	3.61%
Total	Rocco Pezzulo	2,035	13.39%
	Write-ins	449	2.96%
Total votes		15,595	100%

=== External links ===
- Dorcey Applyrs (D) for Mayor
- Rocco Pezzulo (R) for Mayor
