= List of New York State Assembly members (2005–06) =

District	Representative	Party	First elected	Residence
1	Marc Alessi	Democrat	2005	Mastic
2	Fred Thiele	Republican	1995	Sag Harbor
3	Patricia Eddington	Democrat	2000	Medford
4	Steven Englebright	Democrat	1992	Setauket
5	Ginny Fields	Democrat	2004	Oakdale
6	Philip Ramos	Democrat	2002	Central Islip
7	Michael J. Fitzpatrick	Republican	2002	Smithtown
8	Philip Boyle	Republican	2006	Bay Shore
9	Andrew Raia	Republican	2002	East Northport
10	James Conte	Republican	1988	Huntington Station
11	Robert K. Sweeney	Democrat	1988	Lindenhurst
12	Joseph Saladino	Republican	2004	Massapequa
13	Charles Lavine	Democrat	2004	Glen Cove
14	Robert Barra	Republican	2000	Lynbrook
15	Rob Walker	Republican	2005	Hicksville
16	Thomas DiNapoli	Democrat	1986	Great Neck
17	Thomas McKevitt	Republican	2006	East Meadow
18	Earlene Hill Hooper	Democrat	1988	Hempstead
19	David McDonough	Republican	2002	Merrick
20	Harvey Weisenberg	Democrat	1989	Long Beach
21	Thomas Alfano	Republican	1996	North Valley Stream
22	Jimmy Meng	Democrat	2004	Queens
23	Audrey Pheffer	Democrat	1987	Far Rockaway
24	Mark Weprin	Democrat	1994	Fresh Meadows
25	Brian McLaughlin	Democrat	1992	Flushing
26	Ann-Margaret Carrozza	Democrat	1996	Bayside
27	Nettie Mayersohn	Democrat	1982	Flushing
28	Andrew Hevesi	Democrat	2005	Forest Hills
29	William Scarborough	Democrat	1994	Jamaica
30	Margaret Markey	Democrat	1998	Maspeth
31	Michele Titus	Democrat	2002	Far Rockaway
32	Vivian E. Cook	Democrat	1990	Jamaica
33	Barbara M. Clark	Democrat	1986	Queens Village
34	Ivan Lafayette	Democrat	1976	Jackson Heights
35	Jeffrion Aubry	Democrat	1992	Corona
36	Michael Gianaris	Democrat	2000	Astoria
37	Catherine Nolan	Democrat	1984	Ridgewood
38	Anthony Seminerio	Democrat	1978	Richmond Hill
39	Jose Peralta	Democrat	2002	Jackson Heights
40	Diane Gordon	Democrat	2000	Brooklyn
41	Helene Weinstein	Democrat	1980	Brooklyn
42	Rhoda Jacobs	Democrat	1978	Brooklyn
43	Karim Camara	Democrat	2005	Brooklyn
44	James F. Brennan	Democrat	1984	Brooklyn
45	Steven Cymbrowitz	Democrat	2000	Brooklyn
46	Adele Cohen	Democrat	1998	Brooklyn
47	William Colton	Democrat	1996	Brooklyn
48	Dov Hikind	Democrat	1982	Brooklyn
49	Peter Abbate	Democrat	1986	Brooklyn
50	Joseph Lentol	Democrat	1972	Brooklyn
51	Félix Ortiz	Democrat	1994	Brooklyn
52	Joan Millman	Democrat	1997	Brooklyn Heights
53	Vito Lopez	Democrat	1984	Brooklyn
54	Darryl Towns	Democrat	1992	Brooklyn
55	William Boyland, Jr.	Democrat	2003	Brooklyn
56	Annette Robinson	Democrat	2002	Brooklyn
57	Roger L. Green	Democrat	2004	Brooklyn
58	N. Nick Perry	Democrat	1992	Brooklyn
59	Alan Maisel	Democrat	2006	Brooklyn
60	Janele Hyer-Spencer	Democrat	2002	Staten Island/Brooklyn
61	Vacant (previously held by John Lavelle [deceased])	N/A	---	Staten Island
62	Vacant (previously held by Vincent Ignizio [elected to New York City Council on February 20, 2007]	N/A	---	Staten Island
63	Michael Cusick	Democrat	2002	Staten Island
64	Sheldon Silver	Democrat	1976	New York
65	Pete Grannis	Democrat	1974	New York
66	Deborah Glick	Democrat	1990	New York
67	Linda Rosenthal	Democrat	2006	New York
68	Adam Clayton Powell IV	Democrat	2000	New York
69	Daniel O'Donnell	Democrat	2002	New York
70	Keith L. T. Wright	Democrat	1992	New York
71	Herman D. Farrell	Democrat	1974	New York
72	Adriano Espaillat	Democrat	1996	New York
73	Jonathan Bing	Democrat	2002	New York
74	Sylvia Friedman	Democrat	2006	New York
75	Richard Gottfried	Democrat	1970	New York
76	Peter Rivera	Democrat	1992	Bronx
77	Aurelia Greene	Democrat	1982	Bronx
78	Jose Rivera	Democrat	2000	Bronx
79	Michael Benjamin	Democrat	2003	Bronx
80	Naomi Rivera	Democrat	2004	Bronx
81	Jeffrey Dinowitz	Democrat	1994	Bronx
82	Michael Benedetto	Democrat	2004	Bronx
83	Carl Heastie	Democrat	2000	Bronx
84	Carmen E. Arroyo	Democrat	1994	Bronx
85	Ruben Diaz, Jr.	Democrat	1996	Bronx
86	Luis Diaz	Democrat	2002	Bronx
87	J. Gary Pretlow	Democrat	1992	Mount Vernon
88	Amy Paulin	Democrat	2000	Scarsdale
89	Adam Bradley	Democrat	2002	White Plains
90	Sandra Galef	Democrat	1992	Ossining
91	George Latimer	Democrat	2004	Rye
92	Richard Brodsky	Democrat	1982	Greenburgh
93	Louis Mosiello	Republican	2004	Yonkers
94	Kenneth Zebrowski	Democrat	2004	New City
95	VACANT			
96	Nancy Calhoun	Republican	1990	Blooming Grove
97	Ann Rabbitt	Republican	2004	Greenwood Lake
98	Aileen Gunther	Democrat	2003	Forestburgh
99	Willis Stephens	Republican	1994	Brewster
100	Thomas Kirwan	Republican	1994	Newburgh
101	Kevin Cahill	Democrat	1998	Kingston
102	Joel Miller	Republican	1994	Poughkeepsie
103	Patrick R. Manning	Republican	1994	East Fishkill
104	John McEneny	Democrat	1992	Albany
105	Paul Tonko	Democrat	1983	Amsterdam
106	Ronald Canestrari	Democrat	1988	Cohoes
107	Clifford Crouch	Republican	1995	Guilford
108	Pat Casale	Republican	1992	Schaghticoke
109	Robert Reilly	Democrat	2004	Colonie
110	James Tedisco	Republican	1982	Schenectady
111	William Magee	Democrat	1990	Nelson
112	Roy McDonald	Republican	2002	Saratoga
113	Teresa Sayward	Republican	2002	Willsboro
114	VACANT			
115	David Townsend	Republican	1990	Kirkland
116	RoAnn Destito	Democrat	1992	Rome
117	Marc Butler	Republican	1995	Newport
118	Darrel Aubertine	Democrat	2002	Cape Vincent
119	Joan Christensen	Democrat	1990	Syracuse
120	William Magnarelli	Democrat	1998	Syracuse
121	Jeffrey Brown	Republican	2002	Manlius
122	Dierdre Scozzafava	Republican	1998	Gouverneur
123	Gary Finch	Republican	1999	Springport
124	William A. Barclay	Republican	2002	Pulaski
125	Barbara Lifton	Democrat	2002	Ithaca
126	Donna Lupardo	Democrat	2004	Endwell
127	Daniel Hooker	Republican	2002	Saugerties
128	Robert Oaks	Republican	1992	Macedon
129	Brian Kolb	Republican	2000	Canandaigua
130	Joseph Errigo	Republican	2000	Conesus
131	Susan John	Democrat	1990	Rochester
132	Joseph Morelle	Democrat	1990	Irondequoit
133	David Gantt	Democrat	1982	Rochester
134	Bill Reilich	Republican	2002	Greece
135	David Koon	Democrat	1996	Perinton
136	James Bacalles	Republican	1995	Corning
137	Tom O'Mara	Republican	2004	Horseheads
138	Francine DelMonte	Democrat	2000	Lewiston
139	Stephen Hawley	Republican	2006	Batavia
140	Robin Schimminger	Democrat	1976	Kenmore
141	Crystal Peoples	Democrat	2002	Buffalo
142	Mike Cole	Republican	2006	Alden
143	Paul Tokasz	Democrat	1988	Cheektowaga
144	Sam Hoyt	Democrat	1992	Buffalo
145	Mark Schroeder	Democrat	2004	Buffalo
146	Jack Quinn III	Republican	2004	Hamburg
147	Daniel Burling	Republican	1998	Warsaw
148	James P. Hayes	Republican	1998	Amherst
149	Joseph Giglio	Republican	2005	Gowanda
150	William Parment	Democrat	1982	North Harmony
