= John McEneny =

American politician

Honorable John McEneny
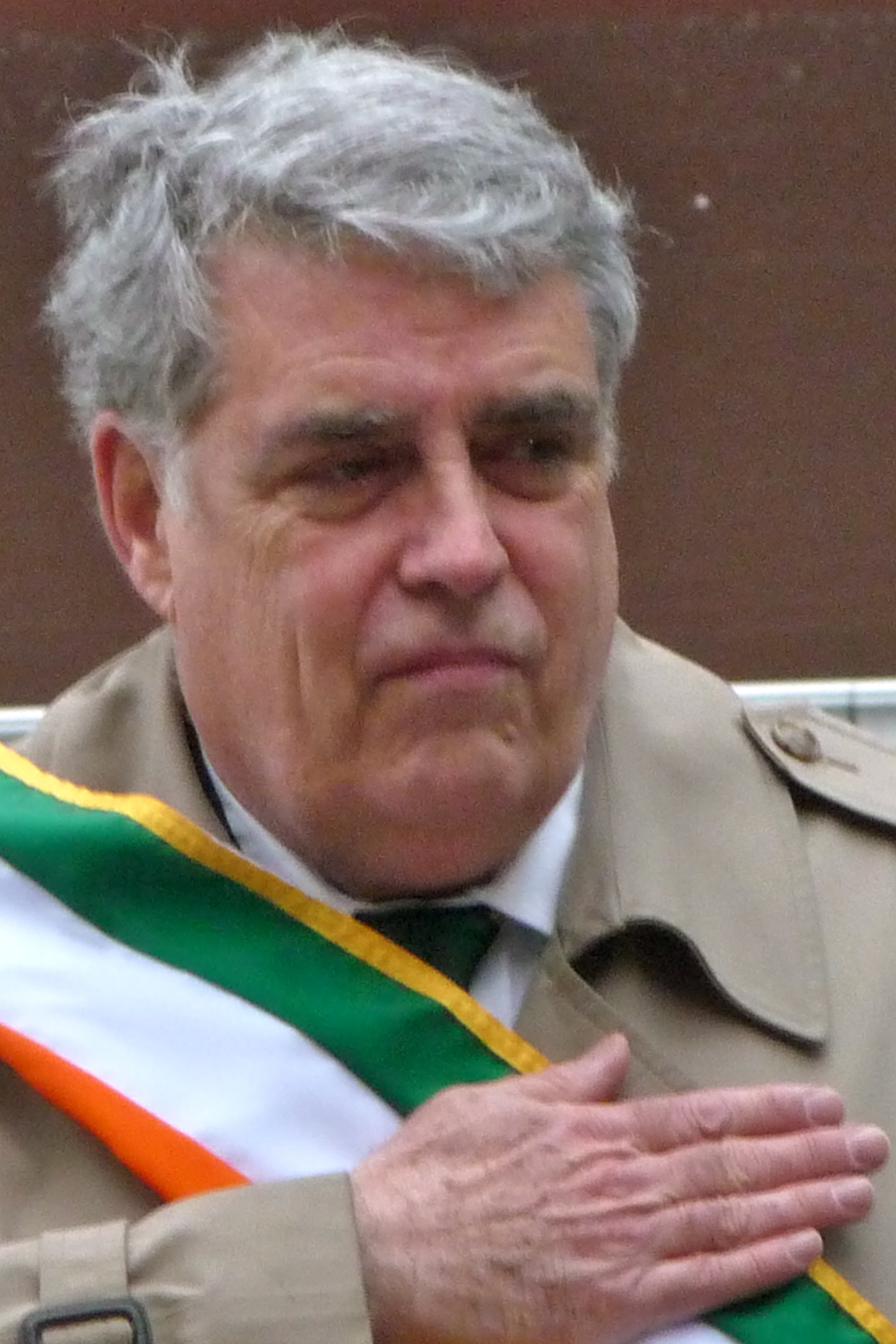
- McEneny in 2010

Member of the New York State Assembly from the 104th district
- In office 1993 – December 31, 2012
- Preceded by: Richard Conners
- Succeeded by: Pat Fahy

Personal details
- Born: August 30, 1943 (age 83) Albany, New York, U.S.
- Party: Democratic
- Spouse: widowed (Barbara)

John "Jack" McEneny (born August 30, 1943 in Albany, New York) is an American politician of the Democratic Party. He was a member of the New York State Assembly, representing about half of Albany County in the 104th Assembly District, from 1993 through 2012.

== Background and early career ==
McEneny went to the Christian Brothers Academy, graduating with fellow future assemblyman Ronald Canestrari. He graduated from Siena College with a bachelor's degree in history, and attended New Mexico State University and the Harvard University's John F. Kennedy School of Government. He served in the Peace Corps in Colombia, South America, and worked as a social worker and for the youth program in Albany. Long-time Mayor Erastus Corning 2nd appointed him to lead the Albany County office of CETA Job Corps from 1971 to 1984. He directed the 1980 United States Census for the Capital District. McEneny was married for many years to his wife, Barbara Leonard, and is widowed; they have four children, John, Rachel, Daniel and Maeve and a granddaughter, Madeline Maeve, and a grandson, Owen Keats.

McEneny's daughter Rachel married John Spencer, Jr., the son of Republican politician John Spencer, the former mayor of Yonkers, New York. Rachel was the Communications Director for Congresswoman Kirsten Gillibrand from 2006 through her appointment to the United States Senate in January 2009, she then served as Senior Advisor for US Senator Gillibrand in Washington, DC. She now serves as the Commissioner of Administrative Services for the City of Albany.

McEneny's son John is an established playwright and Artistic Director of Piper Theatre Productions, a Summer Stock Theatre Company based in Brooklyn, NY. It was co-founded with his sister Rachel.

== Work as a historian ==
McEneny has a degree in history, worked for over a decade as Albany County Historian, and remains involved in issues of archiving historical documents. He is the author or co-author of several non-fiction books, including Albany: Capital City on the Hudson.

== Political career ==
McEneny served as the first director of the New York State "Urban Cultural Parks" program from 1985 to 1989. He was the Deputy County Executive to Albany County Executive Jim Coyne from 1989 to 1991.

In his first election in 1991, McEneny won a write-in campaign for County Legislature.

After serving as chief of staff for state assemblyman Richard Conners for two years, Conners retired and McEneny ran for the position himself in 1992. He won a four-way primary for that seat in September 1992, and the general election that November. He was re-elected in 1994 and 1996.

In the 1997 primary, McEneny unsuccessfully challenged incumbent Mayor Gerald Jennings for the Democratic nomination for Mayor of the City of Albany.

The following year, Jennings supported the race of Albany County Legislator Gary Domalewicz in a primary election against McEneny. In September 1998, McEneny won with 75% of the primary vote. He has easily won re-election since, in 1998, 2000, 2002, 2004, and 2006.

In 2006, McEneny beat Jennings, this time in an election for New York State Democratic Committee. He was re-elected for a ninth term in November 2008, and a tenth in 2010, soundly defeating a "Tea Party" challenger.

McEneny has been criticized for collecting a pension in addition to his pay for being an Assembly member, but he defended it as legal and fair, based on his age of 66.

McEneny declined to run for an 11th term and retired at the end of 2012. He was succeeded by Pat Fahy, a fellow Democrat.

== See also ==
- List of New York State Assembly Members 2005-2006
- New York State Assembly
- List of members of the New York State Assembly

New York State Assembly
Preceded by Richard Conners	New York State Assembly, 104th District; 1993–2012	Succeeded by Pat Fahy
