= Central Warehouse (Albany, New York) =

Refrigeration warehouse building

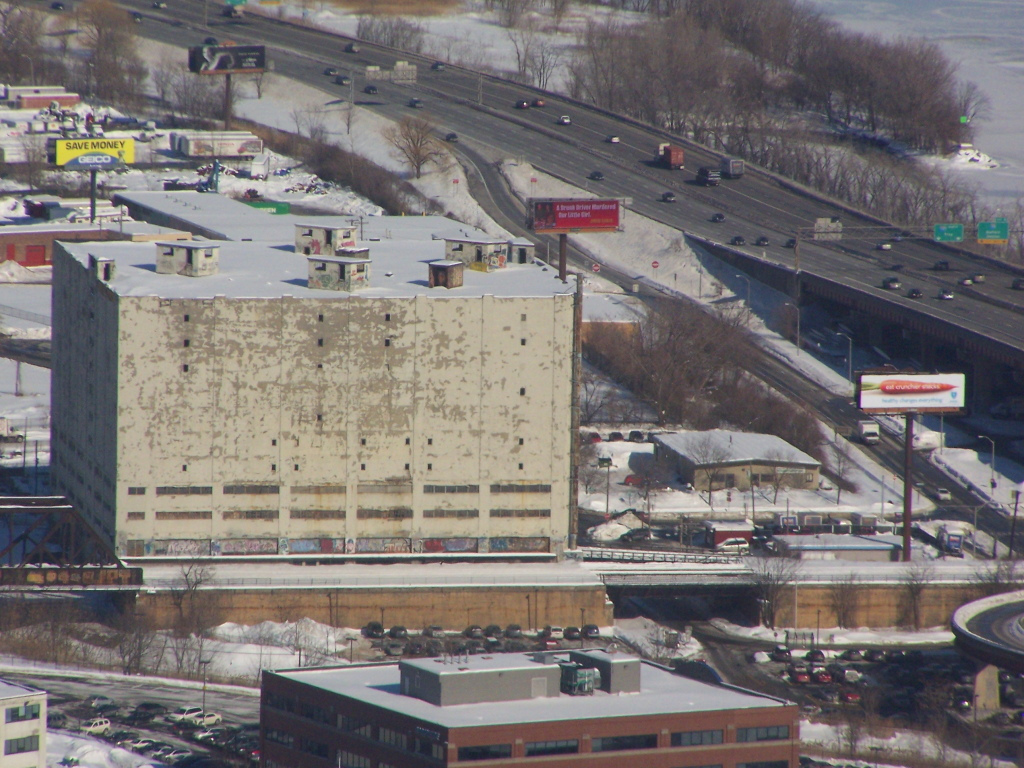

General information
- Location: 143 Montgomery Street, Albany, New York, United States
- Coordinates: 42.6565°N 73.7453°W

The Central Warehouse is a former refrigeration warehouse building in North Albany, a neighborhood of Albany, New York. It is 11 stories tall, with 400,000 square feet (37,000 m^{2}) of space. The building has a rail line that enters the second floor and the walls are 3 feet (0.91 m) thick concrete.

== History ==
Central Warehouse was built in 1927 by the New York Central Railroad. It was a state-of-the-art refrigerated warehouse. During the Great Depression it was used to distribute food to the poor.

=== Sale and eyesore complaints ===
By 1978 the New York State Teachers Retirement System who held the mortgage foreclosed on the property. The facility was ultimately sold to developer Richard Gerrity, who was lauded by Albany Mayor Erastus Corning 2nd for helping revive the city.

In 1981 the building began hosting billboards visible to I-787. These were signs from 1981 to 1983 were not disputed by the state because Mayor Corning had personally approved them, and the New York State Department of Transportation (NYSDOT). By 1983, however Gerrity became a born again Christian and began using the Warehouse's billboards to promote the "Year of the Bible" ad campaign. Mountingcomplaints prompted the state to demand removal for violating the federal Highway Beautification Act. They were removed in 1986.

The company that Gerrity ran, C.W. Associates, declared bankruptcy. The building was abandoned in the early 1990s. In 1996, the building was found to have up to 18 inches (460 mm) of ice built up on some floors. It was believed that the ice kept the ammonia in the refrigeration system from expanding, bursting pipes, and being released into the atmosphere. The ammonia was subsequently drained from the pipes.

=== Fire in 2010 ===
On October 22, 2010, a fire began in the warehouse and lasted for days. The owners claimed no structural damage was done to the building, and that plans to renovate the building into a residential and retail complex were still possible. Over $1 million had already been invested in cleaning the insides of the building.

=== Demolition ===
The City of Albany declared a state of emergency on July 29, 2022 after chunks of the building's concrete wall began to fall near the train tracks below. Amtrak, who uses this portion of the track for service west of Albany, temporarily suspended use of the track. The closure disrupted the inaugural run of the extended Ethan Allen Express to and from Burlington, Vermont. On August 1, after the city made emergency repairs to the crumbling wall, Amtrak resumed use of the track. The City billed the building's owner for the repair costs.

In October 2022, longtime owner Evan Blum lost control of the property after a judge ruled in favor of foreclosure. The building is now under the management of Albany County.

In August 2025, Governor Kathy Hochul presided over a demolition ceremony at the east entrance to the warehouse. Total funding earmarked for the abatement of asbestos and demolition of the warehouse was cited as $14.6 million by Albany County Executive Daniel P. McCoy. By September 2026 news outlets reported that crews had completed the removal of 4,500 short tons (4,100 metric tons) of asbestos, and that demolition would proceed with the dismantlement of the rail bridge connecting the warehouse to the Amtrak rail spur.

Asbestos waste will be sent to the Green Ridge Refuse Disposal Facility in Northumberland, Saratoga County. Separate non-contaminated debris will be sent to the S.A. Dunn landfill in Rensselaer County. These waste facilities are controversial in their own respective communities.
