= Kathy Sheehan =

American politician

75th Mayor of Albany
- In office January 1, 2014 – December 31, 2025
- Preceded by: Gerald Jennings
- Succeeded by: Dorcey Applyrs

Personal details
- Born: December 5, 1963 (age 62) Chicago, Illinois, U.S.
- Party: Democratic
- Spouse: Robert Sheehan
- Education: Bowling Green State University (BA); Albany Law School (JD)

Katherine M. Sheehan (born December 5, 1963) is an American politician and attorney who served as the 75th mayor of Albany, New York. Prior to being elected mayor, Sheehan served as city treasurer from 2010 to 2013. On September 10, 2013, she defeated Corey Ellis in the Democratic primary for mayor of Albany. She later won the general election, becoming the first female mayor in Albany's history. She was re-elected in 2017 and 2021.

== Early life and education ==
Sheehan was born outside Chicago and grew up in the Midwest. She is one of six children. Sheehan earned a bachelor of science degree in journalism from Bowling Green State University in 1985. In 1994, she earned a Juris Doctor from the Albany Law School.

== Career ==
After graduating from law school, she began working in the Albany office of Bond, Schoeneck & King. In 1996, Sheehan took a position at Intermagnetics General Corporation in Latham, New York. She helped negotiate the sale of the company to Philips Medical Systems.

In 2009, Sheehan was elected city treasurer of Albany, New York.

=== Mayor of Albany ===
On November 17, 2012, Sheehan announced herself as a 2013 candidate for mayor. In May 2013, longtime Albany Mayor Gerald Jennings announced that he would not seek a sixth term in the fall elections. Sheehan defeated former Common Councilor Corey Ellis in a Democratic mayoral primary on September 10, 2013. Sheehan won the Democratic nomination with 7,468 votes (65.72%) to Ellis's 3,294 votes (29%). On November 5, 2013, Sheehan won the general election with over 83% of the total vote. When she took office on January 1, 2014, she became the first female mayor in the history of the city.

During Sheehan's tenure, the city's total debt decreased from $140.1 million in 2014 to $106.8 million in 2018. The city installed red-light cameras at various intersections in 2015. In 2017, Sheehan announced a $1 million vacant building grant program.

In February 2017, Sheehan—along with Assemblywoman Patricia Fahy and Congressman Paul Tonko—was criticized by Bishop Edward Scharfenberger for supporting and attending a rally for Planned Parenthood despite being a Roman Catholic politician.

In her 2017 re-election bid, Sheehan faced opposition from Common Council President Carolyn McLaughlin and Common Councilor Frank Commisso Jr. in the Democratic primary. Sheehan won the primary with 51 percent of the vote. Sheehan was re-elected mayor on November 7, 2017, winning 70 percent of the vote; Commisso received 22 percent of the vote as an independent candidate.

== Personal life ==
Sheehan and her husband, Bob, were married in 1992. The Sheehans have an adopted son named Jay. In January 2018, the Sheehans purchased a house in the Ten Broeck Triangle section of the Arbor Hill neighborhood.

Political offices
Preceded by Gerald Jennings	Mayor of Albany; 2014–2026	Succeeded by Dorcey Applyrs
