= Gerald D. Jennings =

American politician

Gerald David Jennings
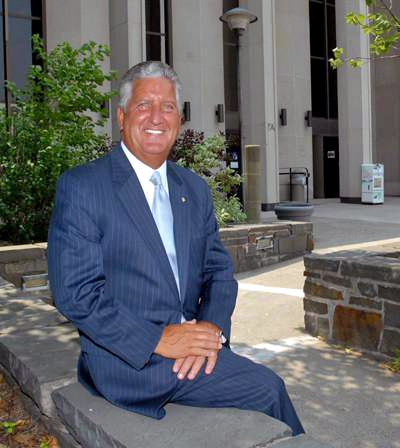

74th Mayor of Albany
- In office January 1, 1994 – December 31, 2013
- Preceded by: Thomas Michael Whalen III
- Succeeded by: Kathy Sheehan

Personal details
- Born: July 31, 1948 (age 78) Albany, New York, U.S.
- Party: Democratic
- Education: SUNY Brockport; University at Albany, SUNY
- Profession: Educator

Gerald David "Jerry" Jennings (born July 31, 1948) is an American former politician from the state of New York who was the 74th mayor of Albany. A Democrat, Jennings won five terms as mayor of Albany and served in that capacity for 20 years. At the time of his retirement in 2013, Jennings was the second longest tenured mayor in the city's history.

== Background and early career ==
Born in North Albany, Gerald "Jerry" Jennings began his career in the Albany City School District after graduating with a bachelor's degree from SUNY Brockport in 1970 and a Master of Science degree from the University at Albany in 1976.

Jennings served for 13 years on the Albany Common Council representing the 11th Ward.

== Mayor of Albany ==
Jennings won an upset in the 1993 Democratic mayoral primary—the real contest in this heavily Democratic city—over Harold Joyce, who had the Democratic Party’s formal endorsement and had only recently been its chairman. He went on to win the general election, becoming the 74th mayor of Albany. Jennings was re-elected four times and retired as mayor at the end of 2013.

In a break from his party, Jennings endorsed George Pataki, a Republican, in the 2002 New York gubernatorial race. The mayor has also supported now-former U.S. Representative John E. Sweeney (R-Clifton Park). Jennings has been a strong proponent of the plan to build a convention center in downtown Albany. He hosted a call-in radio show on WGDJ every Friday from 9 a.m. to 10 a.m.

In 2006, Jennings was voted out of his position on the New York State Democratic Committee by state Assemblyman John McEneny. The mayor had served on the committee since 2002. This race was a rematch of the 1997 primary, when McEneny unsuccessfully challenged Jennings for the Democratic mayoral nomination.

The Albany Times Union reported on November 25, 2008 that Jennings would seek re-election for a fifth term in 2009. The story noted that "Safety in the city, with its youth violence and gun crimes, continues to mar Jennings' leadership and Albany's image." Jennings's opponent for the Democratic primary, Albany Common Council member Corey Ellis, announced his candidacy on March 2, 2009. (Common Council President Shawn Morris was originally also a candidate, but she dropped out over the summer.) Jennings won the primary, held on September 15, 2009, and went on to defeat Republican Nathan Lebron on November 3 in the general election.

=== Illegal guns ===
Jennings served as a member of the Mayors Against Illegal Guns Coalition, a bi-partisan group with a stated goal of "making the public safer by getting illegal guns off the streets." The Coalition was co-chaired by former Boston mayor Tom Menino and former New York City Mayor Michael Bloomberg. Beginning in 2002, the Albany Police Department endured a scandal regarding illicitly purchased machine guns.

=== Parking ticket scandal ===
In November 2008, local media reported that for 15 years the Albany Police Department has engaged in an unapproved effort to avoid parking fines. It was alleged that an unofficial, secret system resulted in "zero fine" tickets being issued to an unknown number of local drivers who either had special windshield decals or were on VIP lists. Both the New York State Comptroller's Office and the Albany Common Council investigated the practice, and the Albany Times Union made a request under the Freedom of Information Law to obtain more information about it. New York State Comptroller Thomas DiNapoli's audit faulted the city for "lax oversight that allowed at least two informal systems for skirting parking fines to flourish." In November 2009, Jennings denied that he knew of any abuses in regard to parking tickets, and also directed that the issuance of no-fine tickets be ceased.

== Electoral history ==
2005 election for Mayor of Albany

  - Gerald D. Jennings (D) (inc.), 68.6%
  - Alice Green (G), 24.8%
  - Joseph P. Sullivan (R), 6.5%

2006 election for New York State Democratic Committee

  - John McEneny, 6,346
  - Gerald D. Jennings, 5,589

2009 Democratic Primary for Mayor of Albany

  - Gerald D. Jennings, 7,615
  - Corey Ellis, 5,971

2009 election for Mayor of Albany.

  - Gerald D. Jennings, 10,466
  - Corey Ellis, 4,801
  - Nathan LeBron 1,178

| Preceded by Thomas Michael Whalen III | Mayor of Albany, New York; 1994–2013 | Succeeded by Kathy Sheehan |
