= Dorcey Applyrs =

American politician (born 1982)

76th Mayor of Albany
- Incumbent
- Assumed office January 1, 2026
- Preceded by: Kathy Sheehan

Personal details
- Born: 1982 (age 43–44) Washington, D.C., U.S.
- Party: Democratic
- Children: 2
- Education: Delaware State University (BS); University at Albany (MPH, DPH)

Dorcey Lanier Applyrs (born 1982) is an American politician and public health professional serving since 2026 as the 76th mayor of Albany, New York. A member of the Democratic Party, she is the first Black person to hold the office and previously served as Albany's city auditor and as a member of the Albany Common Council.

A native of Washington, D.C., Applyrs moved to New York's Capital District c. 2003 and earned a Doctor of Public Health from the University at Albany, SUNY. She began her political career on the Albany Common Council, representing the 1st Ward after winning elections in 2013 and 2017. On the council, her legislative work included making city parks tobacco-free and addressing public safety concerns. In 2020, Applyrs became Albany's city auditor, a role she held until her mayoral campaign.

Applyrs won a four-way Democratic primary for mayor in June 2025 with 52 percent of the vote. She won the general election on November 4, 2025, and took office on January 1, 2026, succeeding Kathy Sheehan.

== Early life and education ==
Applyrs was born in Washington, D.C. in 1982. She earned a bachelor's degree in psychology from Delaware State University in 2003. She moved to the Capital District, New York c. 2003 to pursue a master's degree in public health. She earned a Doctor of Public Health from the University at Albany, SUNY. She submitted her dissertation in 2014, which was titled "Corticosteroid use, emotional health and work/regular daily activities: ethnic differences in women with systemic lupus erythematosus." Her doctoral research studied a diverse sample of 284 women with Systemic Lupus Erythematosus (SLE) and theorized that cultural factors, such as the "adoption of the Superwoman role," could influence health outcomes.

Applyrs initially "had no interest in politics" while growing up in Washington, D.C. and did not take to Albany, New York immediately after moving. She credited learning about the Center for Women in Government at the University at Albany as a "life-changing" experience that made a political career seem "tangible" for her.

== Early career ==
Applyrs began her public service career in Albany doing HIV/AIDS advocacy work, including on Clinton Avenue. She is the founder and chief executive officer of a business called InVision Her.

=== Albany Common Council ===
Applyrs was a political newcomer when she first ran for the Albany Common Council for ward 1 in 2013. She had initially dismissed the thought of running for office until receiving a call asking her to run. She was endorsed by her predecessor, Dominick Calsolaro, whose support helped establish her reputation as a ward leader. She was elected in 2013 and re-elected in 2017, representing the 1st Ward. This was the first elected office she held.

During her time on the council, Applyrs identified a lack of resources as a major challenge, describing the role as a "part-time position with full-time responsibility" where 15 members shared a single staffer. Her first major piece of legislation passed was to make city parks tobacco-free. She also focused on building relationships between police and communities of color, worked on the "Fight for 15" movement, and was one of the first to voice concerns about crude oil tanker trains near homes in the South End. She successfully advocated for the creation of Quazhire Way (also cited as Qazir Sutherland), a street designation honoring a young boy killed by a car, and for lowering the speed limit on that section of South Pearl Street.

In 2019, Applyrs was working with Common Council president Corey Ellis to establish an equity agenda for Albany. She also led the Young Women & Girls Empowerment Summit at Albany Law School and participated with the Young Elected Officials Network Women's Conference. She was succeeded by Sonia Frederick.

=== City auditor ===
On January 1, 2020, Applyrs was appointed Albany's city auditor by Mayor Kathy Sheehan, succeeding Sue Rizzo. She served as the city's chief auditor until launching her mayoral campaign, after which Sam Fein succeeded her as auditor. In 2021, Applyrs reported that the city had paid more than $1 million to settle police misconduct claims since 2015. In 2025, she commissioned a review examining the state of housing in the city from January 2015 to November 2025. The audit found that the share of the city's young professional population had declined by 4%, while the senior population had increased by roughly the same amount. It also identified an overall shortage of approximately 6,350 housing units, primarily affecting households earning less than $35,000 and more than $75,000 annually. Then-incumbent Mayor Kathy Sheehan responded to the audit, stating that "inclusionary zoning is not having its intended effect" and highlighting concerns about "higher rents, no new-market housing construction" and the need for "rehabilitation of our vacant housing."

Reflecting on her tenure as auditor, Applyrs noted that the city worked with a third-party law firm to conduct its fiscal audits. She said she did not believe she had been kept in the dark about the potential risks to Albany's budget, but pointed to the city code, which did not grant the auditor access to certain relevant data.

=== 2025 mayoral election ===
Applyrs was the first candidate to declare her bid for mayor, announcing in November 2023. She received early support from the New York Working Families Party. Her campaign was endorsed by outgoing mayor Kathy Sheehan, assembly speaker Carl Heastie, and other Albany-area Democrats.

In June 2025, Applyrs won a four-way Democratic primary, defeating businessman Dan Cerutti, Corey Ellis, and Carolyn McLaughlin. She won with 52 percent of the vote, a 24-point lead over Cerutti, who had the support of business interests. Turnout for the primary was reported to be higher than in the previous year's presidential cycle.

On November 4, 2025, Applyrs won the general election, defeating Republican Rocco Pezzulo. Her victory made her the first Black mayor to be elected in Albany's history. Her election was described in Spectrum Local News as a "relatively swift rise" in Albany politics, as the city had only six mayors since 1942.

== Mayor of Albany (2026 to present) ==
Applyrs took office in January 2026, succeeding Sheehan to become the city's first new mayor in 12 years.

During the January 2026 winter storm, 302 cars has been towed during the city's snow emergency. Applyrs acknowledged the frustration felt by hundreds and said the city would be waiving the fines associated with noncompliance, though not refunding drivers who paid tow yard retrieval fees.

In a news conference on April 22 at the City of Albany Department of General Services headquarters, Mayor Applyrs announced that 7,930 potholes had been filled in a "pothole blitz" that had been ordered on April 2.

On April 25, the city's Advisory Council on Nightlife Economy, which had been created by Applyrs in the first days of her administration, submitted preliminary recommendations to revitalize dining and entertainment in the city. The report suggested increased street lighting, improved parking affordability, a citywide nightlife brand, and addressing police staffing shortages.

=== 2026 fiscal crisis ===
In the $260 billion state budget proposal for 2026, Albany ranked last among major cities to receive state aid with $57.3 million received the prior year while carrying the highest tax levy in New York. Applyrs appeared before a joint legislative budget hearing on February 11 to request addition state funding to fund city services without further taxing residents, noting that Albany's tax rate is 25% higher than rates in Syracuse and Rochester. She added that current levels of support for municipal workers would become "increasingly untenable" without more funding, noting that half of all properties in the city are tax-exempt due to state ownership.

On March 20, 2026, Administrative Services Commissioner Miriam Dixon issued a memo to all city departments and divisions to call for immediate cuts to city expenditures, including pausing all hiring actions, halting spending on overtime and travel of city officials, and unnecessary equipment purchases. At a news conference addressing the memo, Applyrs said the funding gap was caused by inflation, depressing sales tax revenue, and higher interest rates, in addition to cuts in federal funding. She did not rule out layoffs of city workers but noted its lack of usage in prior crises. Common Council members criticized the memo's recommendation of not buying business cards and noted the city's budget director Gideon Grande leaving his post earlier in the year.

Prior to the public acknowledgement of the $37 million fiscal crisis, Times Union reported city officials receiving salary increases and the creation of new administrative positions in the weeks before Applyrs' news conference. In a statement, the mayor's office noted that they were operating 21% under the adopted budget and all decisions on salary and hiring were made before the deficit situation was discovered.

On May 1, Mayor Applyrs revised the city's 2025 budget deficit from $15 million to $19.6 million after further review of the 2025 spending plan, attributing the inflated amount to flawed 2025 and 2026 budgets, outstanding invoices, and a lack of oversight during the prior administration. Additionally, Applyrs said the city identified $5.3 million in savings. By August 2026, subsequent financial projections estimated budget gaps of $22.18 million for the remainder of 2026 and $33.3 million in 2027.

== Personal life ==
Applyrs is married to Don Applyrs. As of February 2019, she was a first-time mother to their newborn daughter. She described the transition to motherhood as "eye-opening" and was adamant about taking maternity leave from her public role at the time. As of November 2025, she is a mother of two. Applyrs is a member of Delta Sigma Theta sorority.

Political offices
Preceded by Kathy Sheehan	Mayor of Albany; 2026–present	Incumbent
