= New York's 109th State Assembly district =

American legislative district

Assemblymember
Gabriella Romero; D–Albany

New York's 109th State Assembly district is one of the 150 districts in the New York State Assembly. It has been represented by Gabriella Romero since 2025, succeeding Patricia Fahy.

== Geography ==
=== 2020s ===
District 109 is in Albany County. It contains the city of Albany, the Town of New Scotland, and Southern Guilderland.

The district is entirely within New York's 20th congressional district, as well as entirely within New York's 46th State Senate district.

=== 2010s ===
District 109 was in Albany County. It contained portions of the city of Albany, as well as the entirety of the towns of Guilderland, New Scotland and Bethlehem.

== Recent election results ==
=== 2026 ===
2026 New York State Assembly election, District 109
Party	Candidate	Votes	%
Democratic	Gabriella Romero		
Working Families	Gabriella Romero		
Total	Gabriella Romero (incumbent)		
Write-in			
Total votes			

=== 2024 ===
2024 New York State Assembly election, District 109
Primary election
Party	Candidate	Votes	%
Democratic	Gabriella Romero	3,455	29.8
Democratic	Ginnie Farrell	2,439	21.1
Democratic	Dustin Reidy	1,961	16.9
Democratic	Owusu Anane	1,671	14.4
Democratic	Andrew Joyce	1,040	9.0
Democratic	Jack Flynn	923	8.0
Write-in		96	0.8
Total votes		11,585	100.0
General election
Democratic	Gabriella Romero	31,488	
Working Families	Gabriella Romero	4,382	
Total	Gabriella Romero	35,870	72.1
Republican	Alicia Purdy	11,837	
Conservative	Alicia Purdy	1,834	
Total	Alicia Purdy	13,671	27.5
Write-in		206	0.4
Total votes		49,747	100.0
Democratic hold			

=== 2022 ===
2022 New York State Assembly election, District 109
Party	Candidate	Votes	%
Democratic	Patricia Fahy (incumbent)	27,753	74.3
Republican	Alicia Purdy	9,545	25.6
Write-in		45	0.1
Total votes		37,343	100.0
Democratic hold			

=== 2020 ===
2020 New York State Assembly election, District 109
Party	Candidate	Votes	%
Democratic	Patricia Fahy	46,152	
Independence	Patricia Fahy	2,243	
Total	Patricia Fahy (incumbent)	48,395	70.4
Republican	Robert Porter	17,185	
Conservative	Robert Porter	2,401	
Libertarian	Robert Porter	696	
Total	Robert Porter	20,282	29.5
Write-in		96	0.1
Total votes		68,773	100.0
Democratic hold			

=== 2018 ===
2018 New York State Assembly election, District 109
Party	Candidate	Votes	%
Democratic	Patricia Fahy	35,150	
Working Families	Patricia Fahy	2,806	
Independence	Patricia Fahy	1,607	
Total	Patricia Fahy (incumbent)	39,563	71.2
Republican	Robert Porter	13,106	23.6
Conservative	Joseph Sullivan	2,822	5.1
Write-in		42	0.1
Total votes		55,533	100.0
Democratic hold			

=== 2016 ===
2016 New York State Assembly election, District 109
Party	Candidate	Votes	%
Democratic	Patricia Fahy	37,981	
Working Families	Patricia Fahy	2,841	
Independence	Patricia Fahy	1,996	
Total	Patricia Fahy (incumbent)	42,818	69.8
Republican	Jesse Calhoun	15,426	
Conservative	Jesse Calhoun	2,600	
Reform	Jesse Calhoun	455	
Total	Jesse Calhoun	18,481	30.1
Write-in		49	0.1
Total votes		61,348	100.0
Democratic hold			

=== 2014 ===
2014 New York State Assembly election, District 109
Party	Candidate	Votes	%
Democratic	Patricia Fahy	23,144	
Working Families	Patricia Fahy	4,365	
Total	Patricia Fahy (incumbent)	27,509	66.5
Republican	Jesse Calhoun	10,828	
Conservative	Jesse Calhoun	2,716	
Stop Common Core	Jesse Calhoun	284	
Total	Jesse Calhoun	13,828	33.4
Write-in		53	0.1
Total votes		41,390	100.0
Democratic hold			

=== 2012 ===
2012 New York State Assembly election, District 109
Primary election
Party	Candidate	Votes	%
Democratic	Patricia Fahy	5,335	36.3
Democratic	Frank Commisso Jr.	2,686	18.3
Democratic	Christopher Higgins	2,372	16.2
Democratic	William McCarthy Jr.	1,929	13.1
Democratic	Jim Coyne	1,300	8.9
Write-in		572	3.9
Democratic	Margarita Perez	486	3.3
Total votes		14,680	100
Independence	Theodore Danz Jr.	158	51.0
Independence	Patricia Fahy	138	44.5
Write-in		14	4.5
Total votes		310	100
General election
Democratic	Patricia Fahy	34,989	
Working Families	Patricia Fahy	2,978	
Total	Patricia Fahy	37,967	63.9
Republican	Theodore Danz Jr.	17,357	
Independence	Theodore Danz Jr.	1,962	
Total	Theodore Danz Jr.	19,319	32.5
Conservative	Joseph Sullivan	2,043	3.5
Write-in		58	0.1
Total votes		59,387	100.0
Democratic hold			
