= Gabriella Romero =

American politician

Member of the New York State Assembly from the 109th district
- Incumbent
- Assumed office January 1, 2025
- Preceded by: Patricia Fahy

Personal details
- Born: Albany, New York, U.S.
- Party: Democratic
- Education: Union College (BA); Albany Law School
- Website: Campaign website Official website

Gabriella A. Romero is an American politician and attorney who is a member of the New York State Assembly for the 109th district. The district includes the city of Albany, the town of New Scotland, and part of the town of Guilderland.

Prior to her career in elected office, Romero worked as an attorney in the Albany County Public Defender's office. A Democrat, she was elected to the Albany, New York Common Council in 2021. In 2024, Romero won the Democratic primary to fill an open Assembly seat in District 109 and later prevailed in the general election.

== Early life and education ==
Born in Albany, Romero attended Shaker High School in Colonie, New York. She earned her undergraduate degree at Union College and is a graduate of Albany Law School.

== Career ==
=== Albany Common Council ===
In 2021, Romero, then serving as an attorney in the Albany County Public Defender's office, ran for and won the 6th Ward seat on the Albany Common Council. The incumbent, Richard Conti, had declined to seek re-election. Romero's platform included police reforms in favor of more transparency and accountability, including the release of police disciplinary records. She assumed office in January 2022. There, she worked on support for the homeless and mental health. She also helped legalize skateboarding in the city.

=== New York State Assembly ===
In early 2024, State Senator Neil Breslin announced his retirement. He was succeeded by then-Assemblymember Patricia Fahy. Six Democrats competed for Fahy's vacated 109th Assembly district seat. Romero won the Democratic primary with the support of the Working Families Party. In response to rising living expenses, Romero's platform included free healthcare and better access to healthcare.

After winning the 2024 general election, Romero expressed concern about deficits in the state budget (especially regarding the Metropolitan Transportation Authority) and high living expenses. She also called for greater state investment in the city of Albany. She supports zoning reform and new construction subsidies for the purposes of improving affordable housing. She has also called for legislation to avoid deaths such as that of Robert Brooks at Marcy Correctional Facility.

Romero's Assembly district includes the city of Albany, the town of New Scotland, and part of the town of Guilderland.

Romero is the first Latina to represent an upstate New York district in the Assembly. She is a progressive. Romero is a vocal supporter of New York's medical aid in dying law. She has introduced legislation to establish a gender-affirming care program.
