= Parish life director =

Administrative position within the Catholic Church in the United States

Parish life director is a lay title assigned to certain administrators within the United States Catholic Church. They are professional ministers, appointed by bishops, and act as the leadership of a parish, while a priest is assigned to perform the sacraments. They have not taken priestly vows, and may be married with children. A movement began in the 1980s to set more parish life directors as heads of local parishes, in expectation of a shortage of pastors. The trend did not pick up, and the position has seen a decline in numbers, where there were 553 parish life directors in 2005, and 428 in 2012. During this time, the number of parishes without a pastor rose, from 2,843 to 3,554.
