= Empire State Plaza =

Building complex in Albany, New York

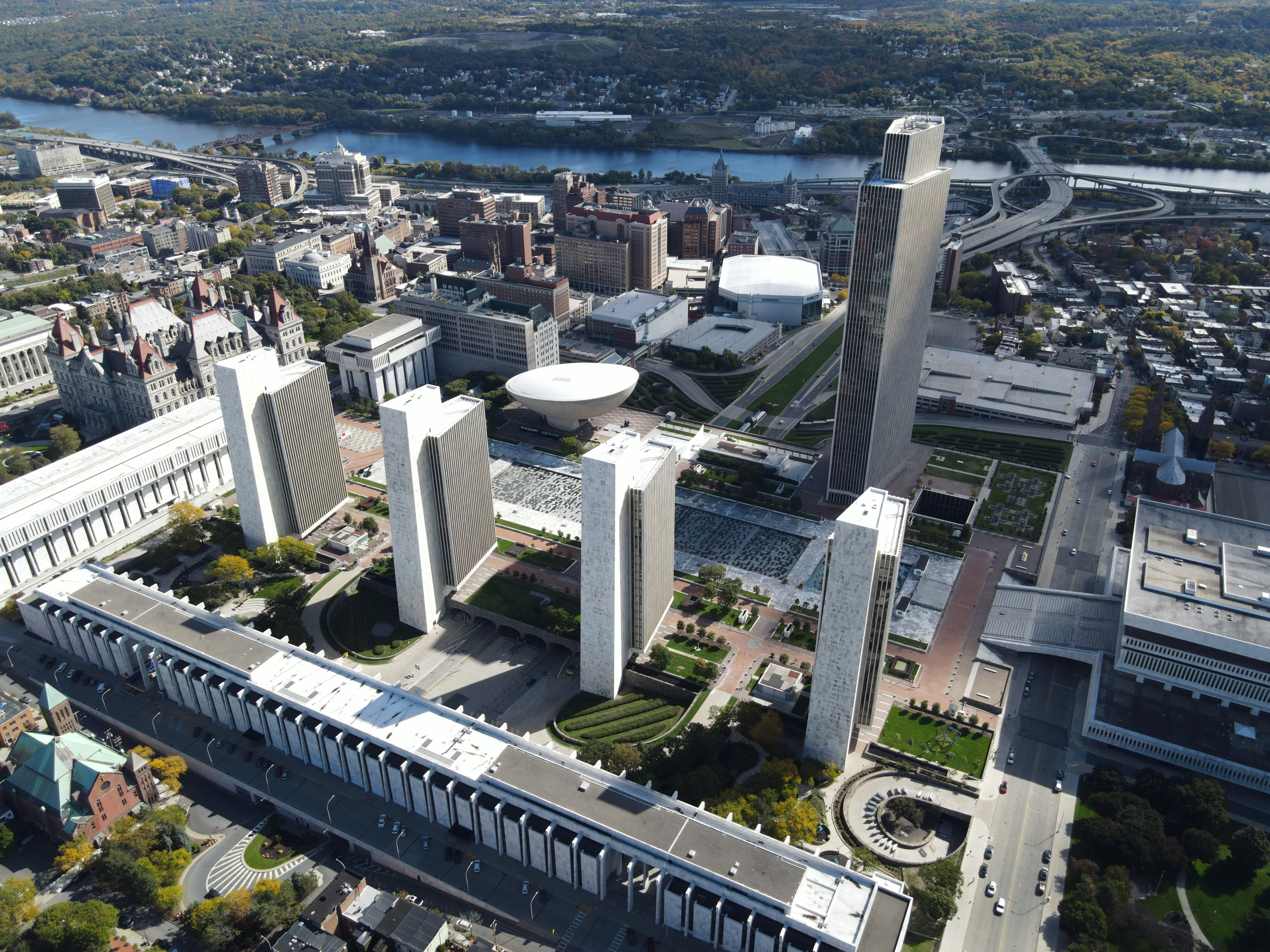
- Aerial view, looking eastward to the Hudson River
- Interactive map highlighting the Empire State Plaza
- Alternative names: Governor Nelson A. Rockefeller Empire State Plaza

General information
- Architectural style: Modernist, Brutalist, International
- Location: Albany, New York, Between Madison Avenue and State Street, and Swan Street and Eagle Street
- Coordinates: 42.650347°N 73.759688°W
- Current tenants: Various government agencies of the State of New York, New York State Museum
- Construction started: 1965
- Completed: 1976
- Renovated: 2001
- Cost: $2 billion
- Owner: State of New York

Height
- Height: 44 stories, 589 feet (180 m)

Technical details
- Structural system: Reinforced concrete
- Floor count: 6-story platform; 44-story tower

Design and construction
- Architect: Wallace Harrison
- Architecture firm: Harrison & Abramovitz

Renovating team
- Architect: Wiss, Janney, Elstner Associates

The Governor Nelson A. Rockefeller Empire State Plaza (known commonly as the Empire State Plaza, and also as the South Mall or Albany Mall) is a complex of several state government buildings in downtown Albany, New York.

The complex was built between 1965 and 1976 at an estimated total cost of $2 billion. It houses several departments of the New York State administration and is integrated with the New York State Capitol, completed in 1899, which houses the state legislature. Among the offices at the plaza are the Department of Health and the Biggs Laboratory of the Wadsworth Center. The Empire State Art Collection, a major public collection of 1960s and 1970s monumental abstract artworks, is on permanent display throughout the site. The New York State Office of General Services maintains the plaza. The Nelson A. Rockefeller Empire State Plaza Performing Arts Center Corporation is a New York state public-benefit corporation that was created in 1979 to manage the performing arts facility in the plaza.

== History ==
=== Conception ===
The plaza was the idea of Governor Nelson Rockefeller, who was inspired to create the new government complex after Princess (later Queen) Beatrix of the Netherlands visited Albany for a celebration of the area's Dutch history. Riding with the princess through a section of the city known colloquially as "the Gut", Rockefeller was embarrassed. He later said, "there's no question that the city did not look as I think the Princess thought it was going to".

Rockefeller conceived the basic design of the complex with architect Wallace Harrison in flight aboard the governor's private plane. Rockefeller doodled his ideas in pen on the back of a postcard, and Harrison revised them. They used the vast scope and style of Brasília, Versailles and Chandigarh as models. The massive scale was designed to be appreciated from across the Hudson River, as the dominant feature of the Albany skyline.

=== Antecedent ===
When the State of New York seized the area in March 1962, it was home to about 7,000 residents according to the 1960 US Census. Like urban cores in most other American cities in the Northeast and Midwest, downtown Albany had seen sharp declines in white population, downtown retail activity, and hotel occupancy rates since World War II. At the same time, the African American population had doubled in the downtown census tracts between 1950 and 1960. At the time of the State's 1962 seizure, the largest ethnic group in the entire area was African American, at about 14% of the total population. First and second generation Italian Americans made up about 10% of the area's population.

The 98-acre area was made up of several distinct neighborhoods. To the south, clustered around Madison and Grand streets was the heart of Albany's Italian American community. Although only about half of Little Italy was seized by the State, the demolition and subsequent noise and dirt associated with the construction of the Empire State Plaza led many residents to move, even if their homes were not appropriated. To the north lay Albany's rooming house district, centered on Jay, Lancaster, and Hudson streets between Eagle and S. Swan. About 10% of the buildings torn down for the Empire State Plaza were rooming houses. In them lived over 1,000 single men, often elderly and poor. They made up about one third of all households and at least 15% of the take area's population. The eastern part of the take area, where the South Mall Arterial is now, was Albany's "Gut", an area of cheap hotels, flophouses, and dive bars. The take area also boasted elegant homes, particularly on State Street at the northern end and Elm Street below Madison.

The area in and around the seized area had long been home to immigrants and their churches. Five churches operated in the area in the years just before its seizure by the state. Holy Cross, a German national Catholic church founded in 1850, was at the corner of Hamilton and Philip streets. Due to declining numbers, it relocated in 1959 to Western and Brevator on the city's western fringe. Assumption of the Blessed Virgin Mary, a French national Catholic church, was at 109 Hamilton, between Grand and Fulton streets. Like Holy Cross, the church had seen a drop in parishioners to the point that in 1961 it celebrated only four baptisms and one marriage. Assumption relocated to the northern suburb of Loudonville. First Methodist Church, dating back to the 18th century, stood on the corner of Hudson and Philip streets.

After the State demolished the church, its congregants decided to merge with Trinity Methodist on Lark and Lancaster Streets, rather than try to start up again in a new location. St. Sophia Greek Orthodox Church at 8 Lancaster Street was the heart of the Greek-American community, and was in the midst of a major expansion campaign when the state seized the area. It relocated to Whitehall Road on Albany's fringe. A bit further west stood St. Paul's Episcopal Church at 78 Lancaster Street. Founded in 1827, it moved to the Lancaster Street location in 1862. The Lancaster church boasted several Tiffany stained glass windows, attesting to the former wealth of the area. It relocated to Hackett Blvd. in 1965.

Just outside the area seized by the State stood 3 churches. St. Anthony, on the corner of Madison and Grand (the building now houses Grand Street Community Arts), was the largest and most vibrant of the three nearby Catholic national churches. Just a few blocks west, at the corner of Madison and Eagle stands the Catholic Cathedral of the Immaculate Conception. The predominantly black Wilborn Temple was growing along with the African American population of the area. In 1957 it relocated from 79 Hamilton Street, within the area seized by the State in 1962, to the former Beth Emeth synagogue on S. Swan between Lancaster and Jay.

=== Financing ===
Paying for the construction of the plaza was a major problem, since a bond issue for an Albany project would almost certainly have been disapproved by the statewide electorate. Despite the displacement of thousands of loyal political voters, Albany Mayor Erastus Corning worked with Rockefeller to engineer a funding scheme that used Albany County bonds instead of state bonds. During repayment, the state guaranteed the principal and interest payments in the form of rent for a plaza that was officially county property. Ownership was then to be transferred to the state in exchange for regular payments in lieu of taxes. Control of the bond issues gave Corning and party boss Daniel P. O'Connell influence when dealing with the Republican governor. The bonds were paid in 2001 and the state assumed ownership, though it required years of paperwork to change title.

=== Construction ===
The state obtained possession of the 98.5-acre site on March 27, 1962, through eminent domain. Demolition of the 1,200 structures began in the fall of 1962 and continued through the end of 1964. The official groundbreaking was on June 21, 1965, with an initial cost estimate of $250 million. The project was plagued by delays. Unrealistic schedules set by the state forced contractors for various parts to interfere with each other during work. The difficult working conditions caused some of the contractors to successfully sue the state later. Most of the construction was overseen by successive Office of General Services commissioners Cortlandt V. R. Schuyler and Almerin C. O'Hara.

The first building to be completed was the Legislative Office Building in 1972, and the last was the Egg in 1978. Though the plaza was dedicated on November 21, 1973, it finally began full operation in 1976 at a total cost exceeding $1.7 billion. As of 2014, more than 11,000 state employees work at the complex.

=== 2017 microgrid electric project ===
In May 2017, New York Governor Andrew Cuomo's administration announced the state would later in the year begin construction on a new microgrid that would provide power to the Empire State Plaza. The new microgrid project is expected to produce 90% of the complex's yearly electric energy needs. The Cuomo administration said the project should save the state $2.7 million in annual energy costs and cut down on greenhouse emissions. The project will use natural gas-fired turbine generators.

== Architecture ==
The eastern elevation of the plaza

=== Overview ===
The Empire State Plaza consists of various steel and reinforced concrete buildings, all clad in imported stone (except The Egg, which fully exposes its concrete structure). The buildings are placed on a 6-story stone-clad Main Platform, supported by more than 25,000 steel pilings driven an average of 70 feet (21 m) into soft glacial clay deposits underlying the site. The exterior columns and narrow windows of the buildings resemble the style of the World Trade Center towers in New York City, which were completed around the same time.

The placement of starkly abstract geometric building forms on a monolithic plaza is said to represent Rockefeller's concept of architecture as similar to sculpture. The plaza as a whole is an example of Modern architecture, with all buildings but The Egg being built in the International Style. The Egg is built in the Brutalist style.

The scale of the buildings in the plaza is imposing, and the complex is the most easily recognizable aspect of the Albany skyline. The 44-story Corning Tower is the tallest building in New York State outside of New York City, and features an observation deck on its 42nd floor. It is free and open to the public on weekdays. However, it does not feature a 360-degree view because it has no windows on the west side.

The Main Platform of the plaza itself is one of the largest buildings in the world. The complex incorporates 240,000,000 cubic feet (6,800,000 m^{3}) of concrete, clad with 600,000 cubic feet (17,000 m^{3}) of stone imported from many locations on three continents. A detailed walking tour guide can be downloaded, describing the many varieties of stone and concrete used in construction.

The Swan Street Building is more than a quarter of a mile long (400 meters), and modeled partly on Pharaoh Hatshepsut's Temple at Deir el-Bahri, Egypt.

Originally, hundreds of Norway maples were planted; today, they have been classified as invasive plant species by the State of New York.

The plaza also features an outdoor ice skating rink during the winter on one of the plaza's reflecting pools.

=== Buildings ===
Wallace Harrison served as supervising architect for the entire project, with other associated firms as listed below. The buildings constituting the plaza include:

- the four Agency office buildings (numbered "Agency 1" through "Agency 4")
- the Mayor Erastus Corning 2nd Tower
- The Egg (a theater)
- the Cultural Education Center (State Museum, Library, and Archives)
- the Robert Abrams Building for Law and Justice (known previously as the Justice Building), by architects Sargent, Crenshaw, Webster, and Folley
- the Legislative Office Building (LOB), by architects James, Meadows, and Howard
- the Swan Street Building (sectioned into "Core 1" through "Core 4"), by architects Carson, Lundin & Shaw
- Cornerstone at the Plaza (event space)
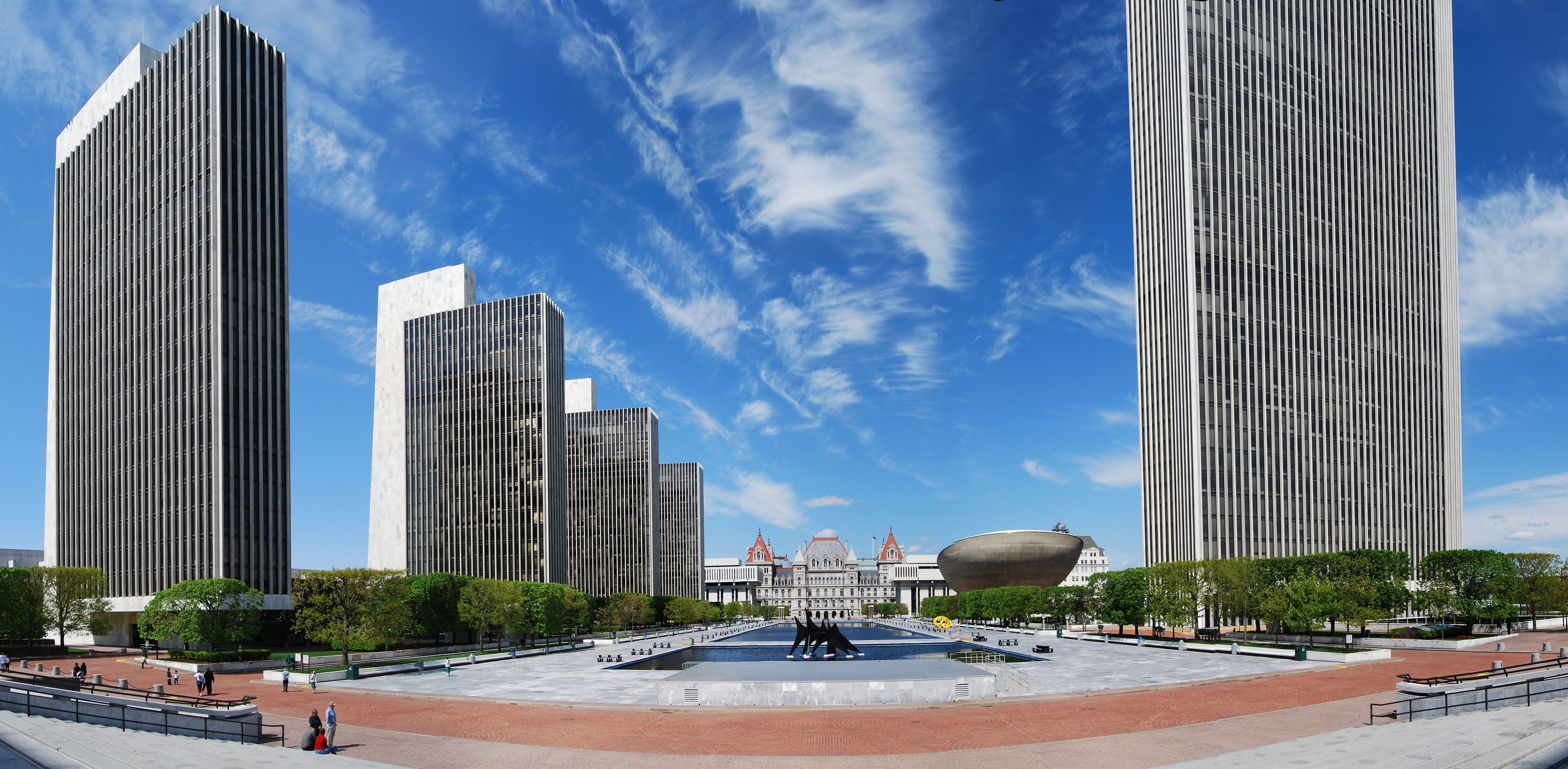
Empire State Plaza (looking northeast)

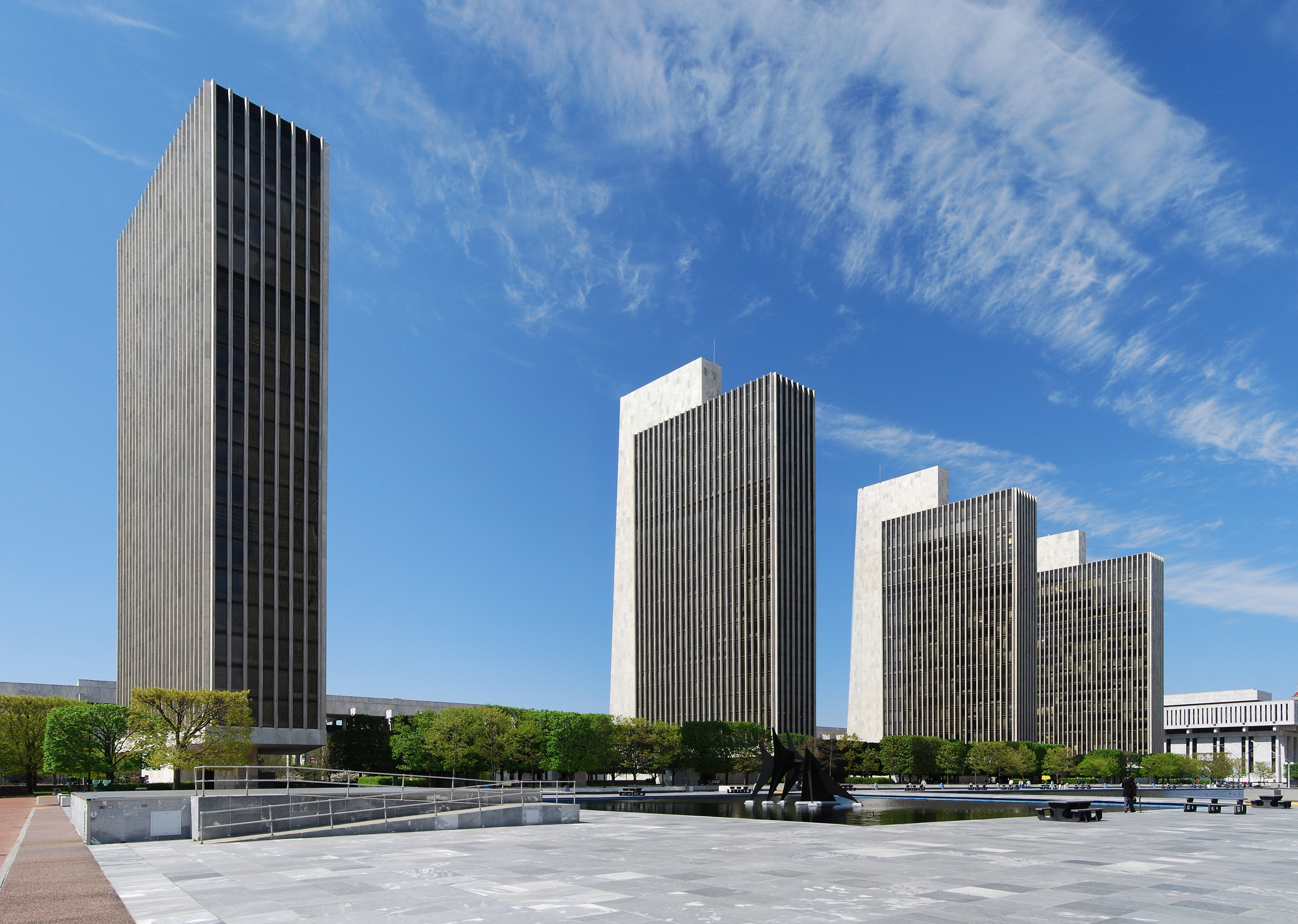
Agency Buildings 1 to 4

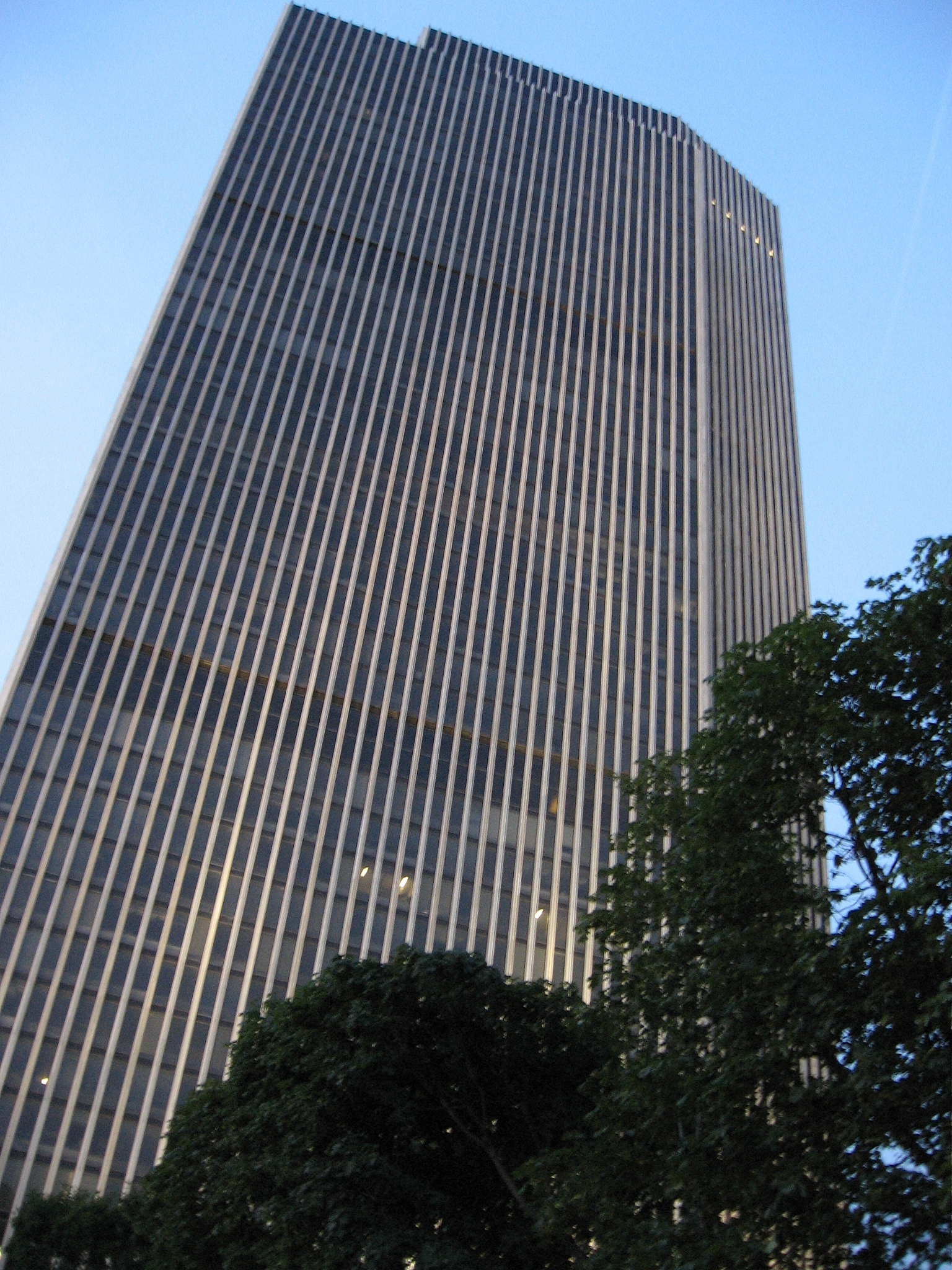
Corning Tower

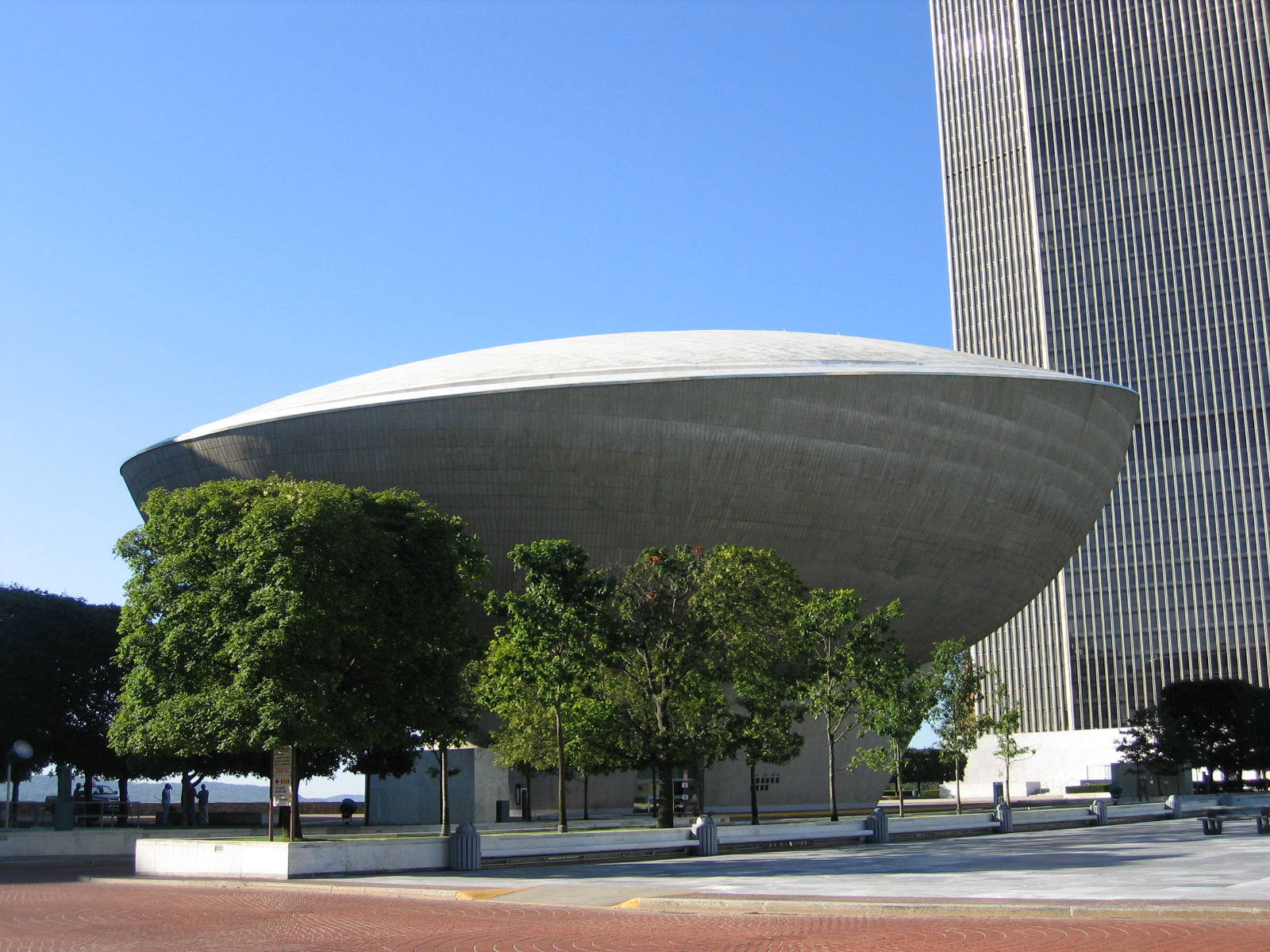
The Egg

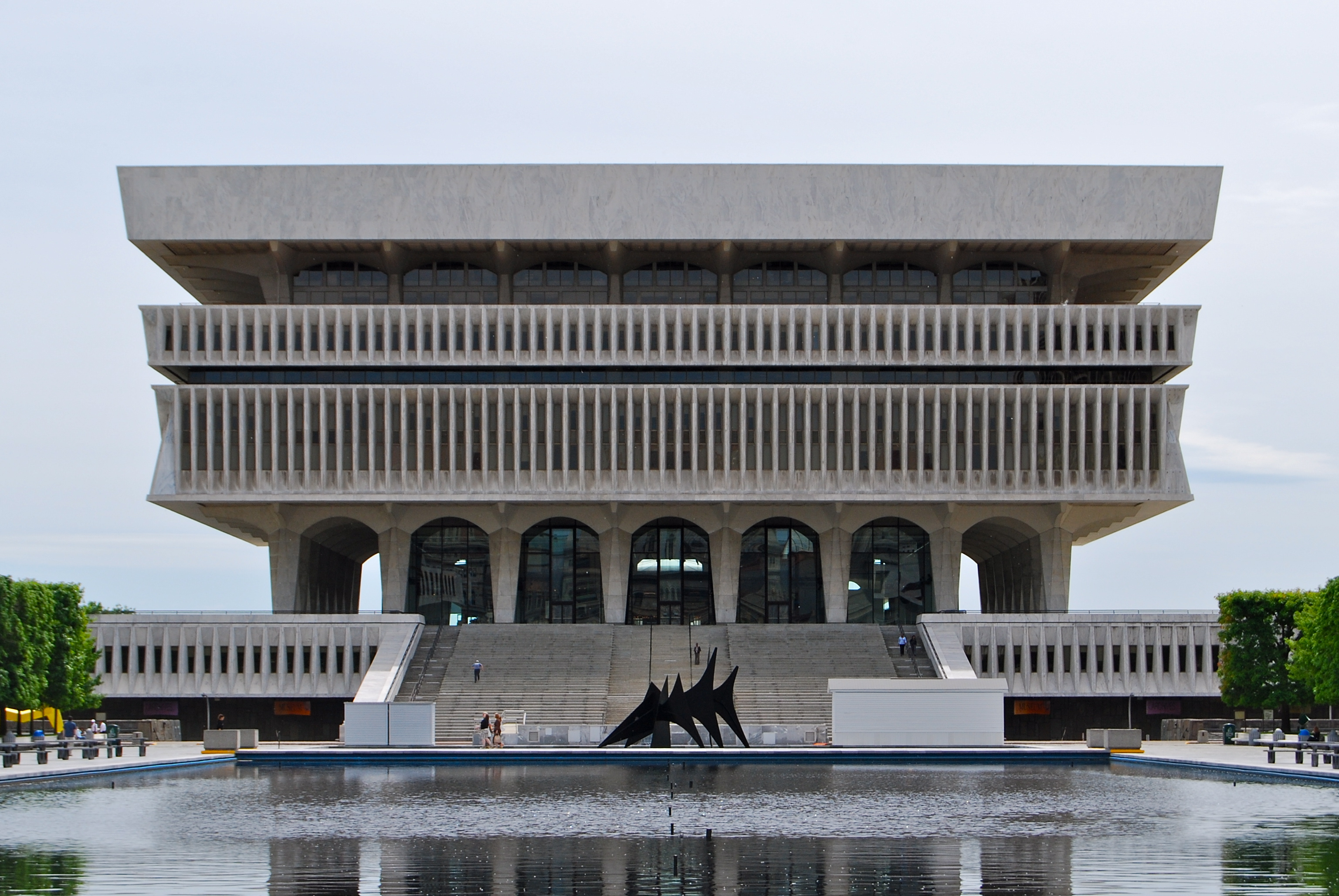
Cultural Education Center

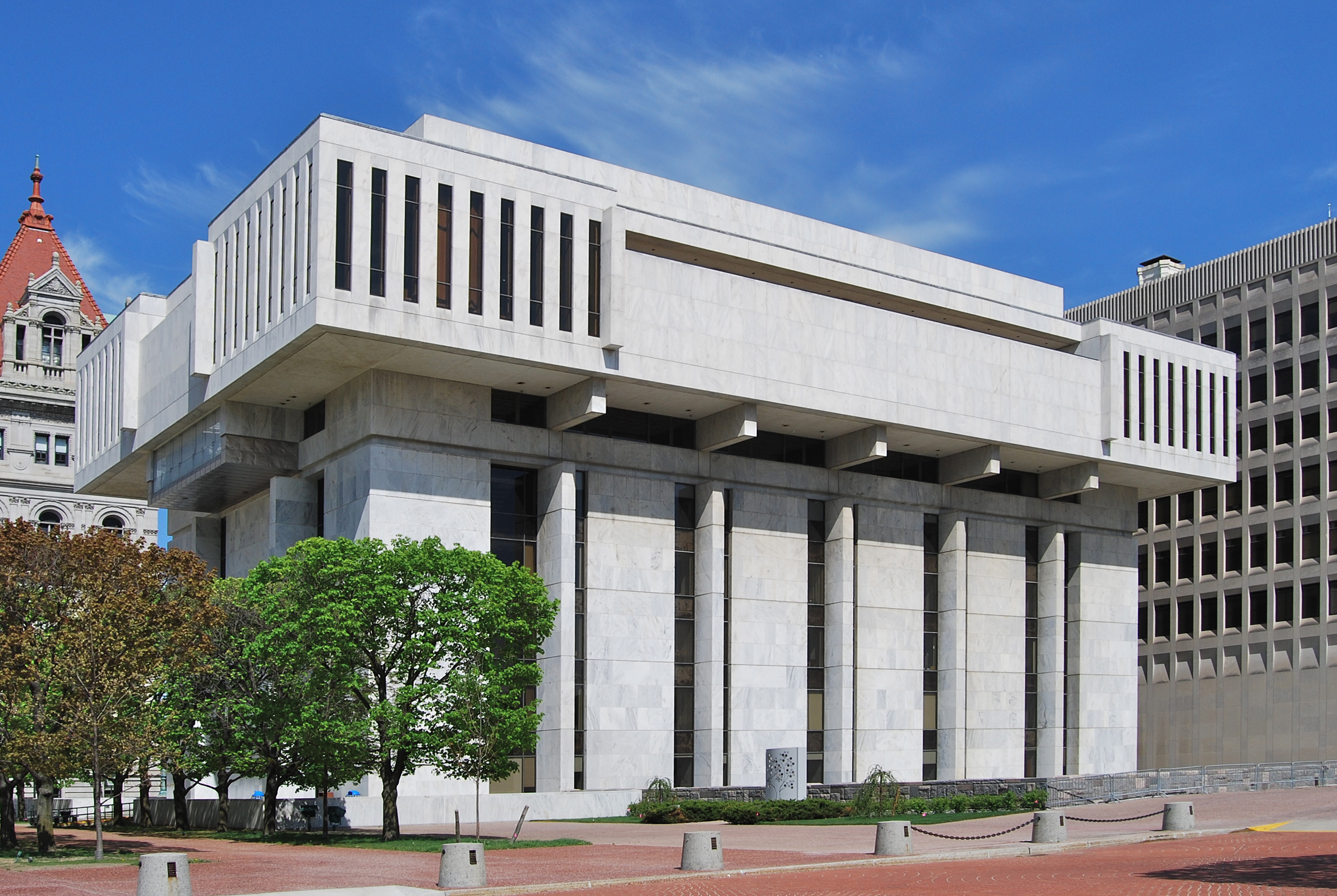
Robert Abrams Building for Law and Justice

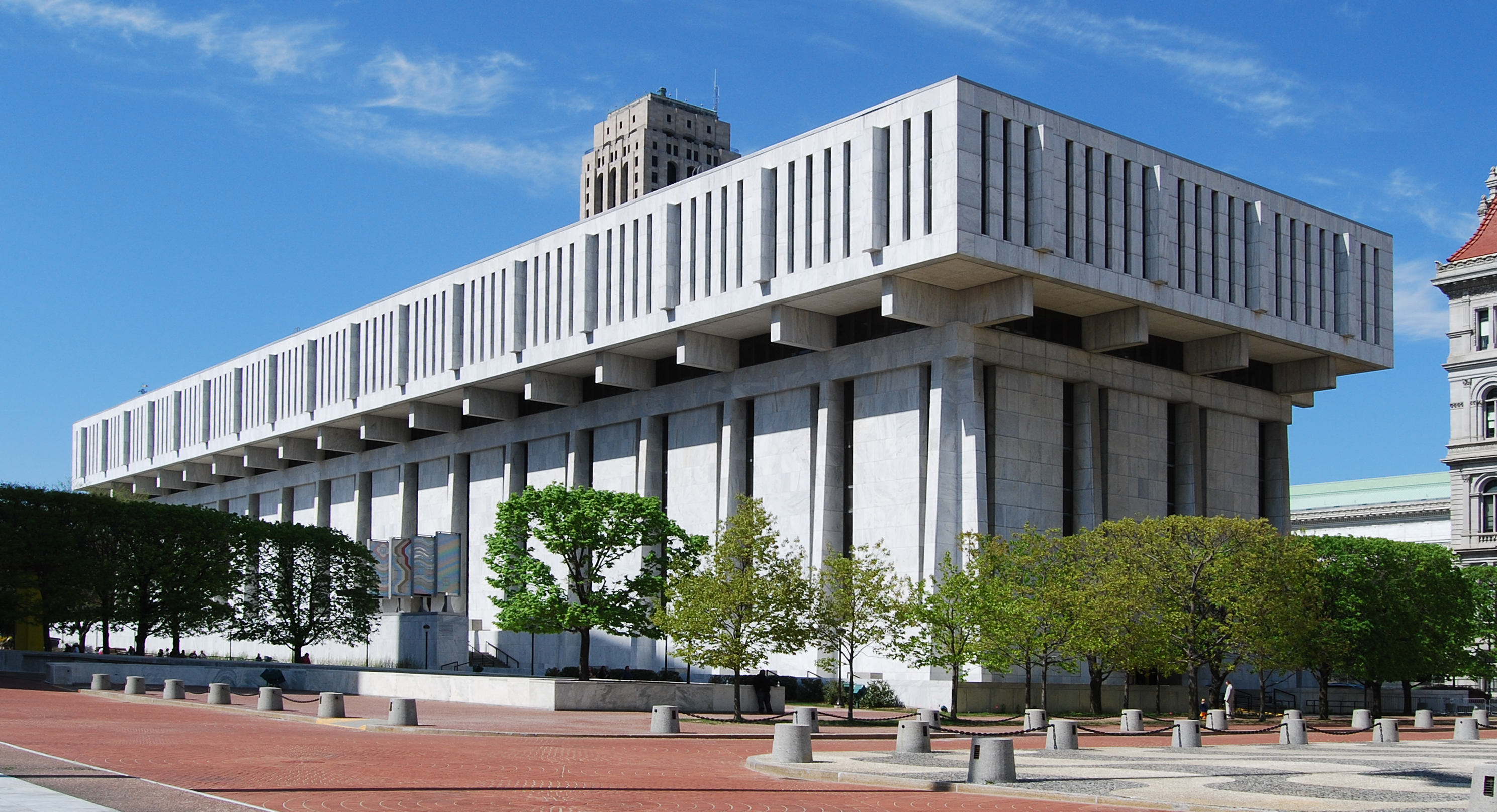
Legislative Office Building

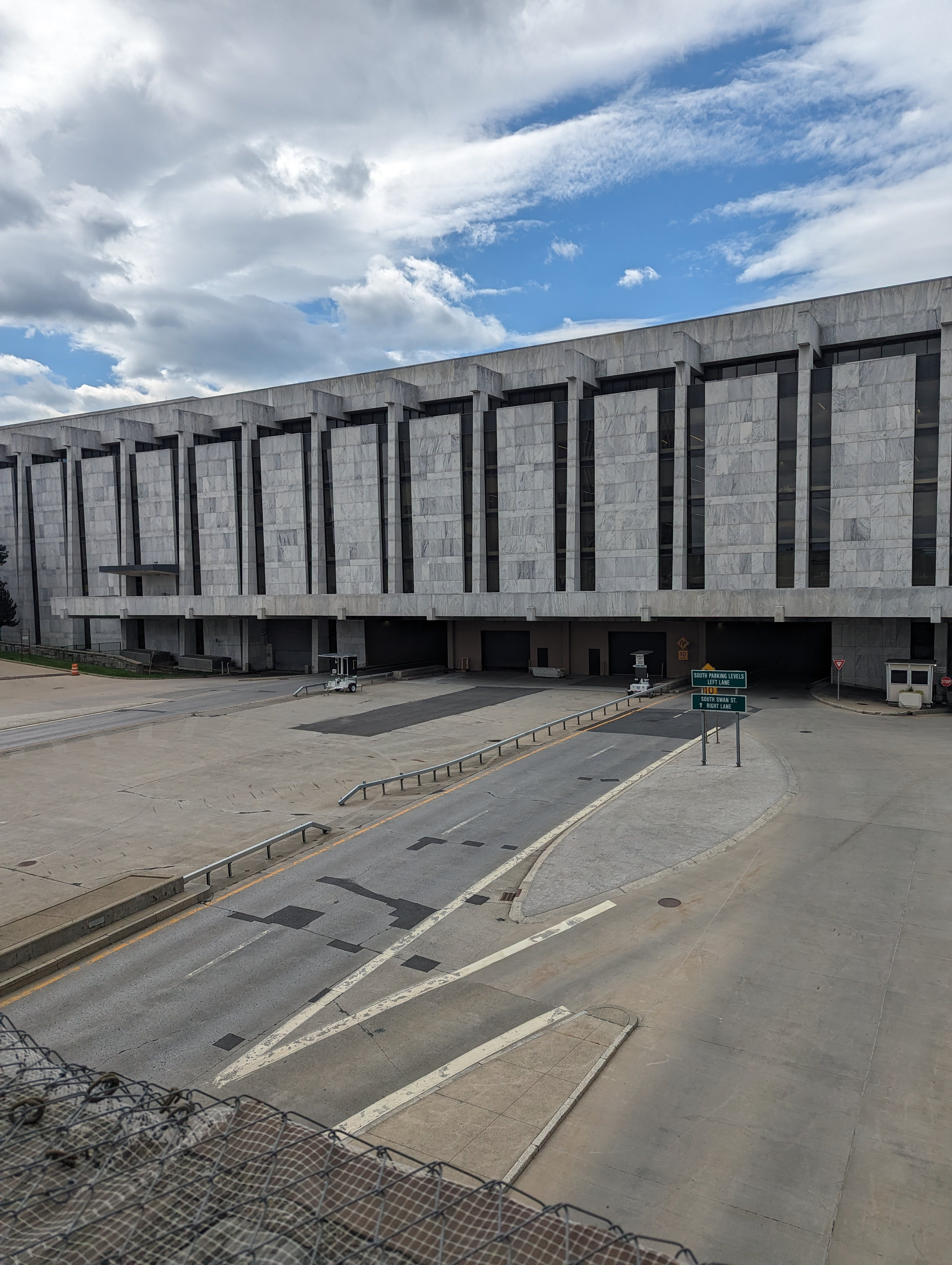
Swan Street Building (facing the plaza)

== Layout ==
New York State Capitol, which is at the north end of the plaza

The buildings are set around a row of three reflecting pools. On the west side are the four 23-story, 310-foot (94 m) Agency towers. On the east side is the Egg (Meeting Center) and the 44-floor (589-foot (180 m)) Erastus Corning Tower, which has an observation deck on the 42nd floor. On the south end is the Cultural Education Center, set on a higher platform; and on the north end is the New York State Capitol. While the Capitol predates the plaza, it is connected to the Concourse by an escalator which allows underground access to the rest of the plaza, most notably (to the New York State Legislature, at least), the Legislative Office Building.

The plaza is connected to the MVP Arena (a covered sports arena, known formerly as the Pepsi Arena, and originally named the Knickerbocker Arena) by a pedestrian bridge and to the New York State Capitol by a tunnel. Additionally a tunnel that runs under the West Capitol Park connects the Capitol building with the Alfred E. Smith Building at 80 South Swan Street.

The entire complex is wheelchair-accessible, except the State Street Capitol entrance and the Concourse tunnel to the Swan Street Building. An access map is available onsite or is downloadable.

== Transportation ==
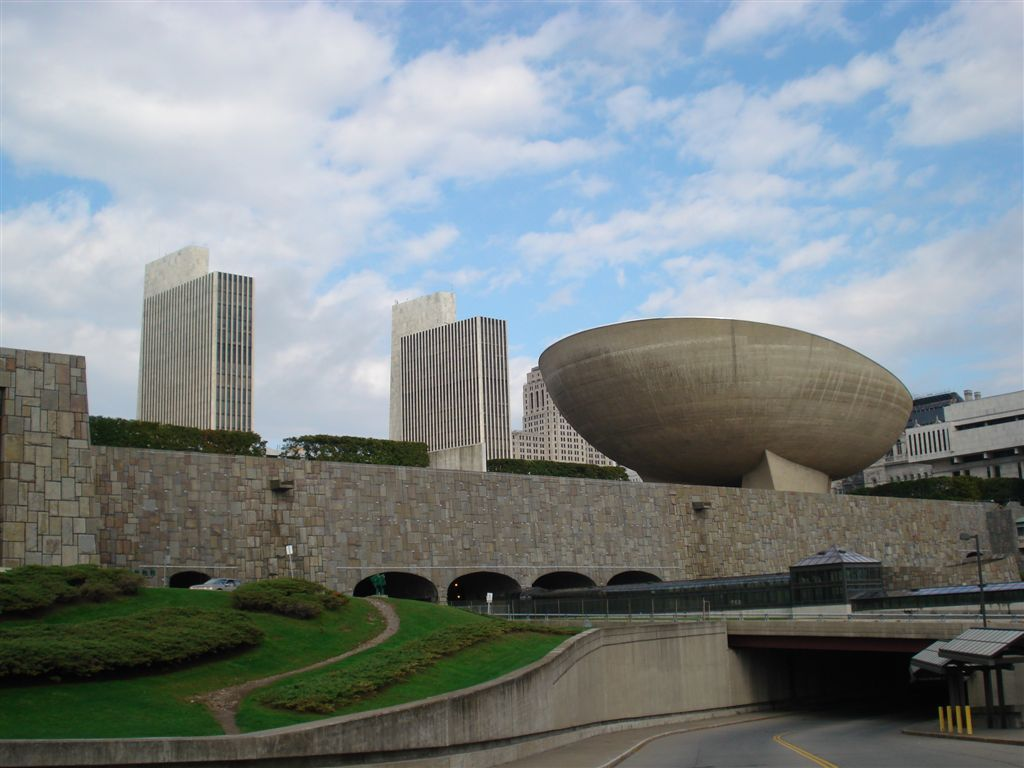
View of plaza bulkhead wall from Eagle Street, with access to parking garage

Crossing under the plaza is the South Mall Arterial, a short highway artery connecting to the Dunn Memorial Bridge. Construction of this highway destroyed many buildings of Albany's downtown. In the initial proposal, the highway was to go from Interstate 90 in North Greenbush (current exit 8 to NY Route 43), through Rensselaer, under the plaza, and connecting to the also-cancelled Mid-Crosstown Arterial, which would have extended from I-90 Exit 6, through the city, traveling underneath Washington Park, meeting with the South Mall Expressway in the process, and continuing on to the New York State Thruway at Exit 23.

The current South Mall Arterial ends abruptly in a loop at Swan Street, with both eastbound and westbound lanes using the two outer portals of the four-portal tunnel leading under the plaza. (The inner two were to be express lanes to the Mid-Crosstown Arterial/SME interchange underneath the park.) The only evidence of the original Mid-Crosstown Arterial is the four level stack interchange for I-90 at present day US 9.

There are multiple parking lots within the lower levels of the Main Platform.

There are several CDTA bus routes serving the plaza complex, including some with direct access to a bus station in the underground Concourse. Those routes that stop inside the plaza loop are: 214, 224, 233, 519, 523, 524, 525, 540, and 560. There are also 2 routes that stop at Madison Avenue outside the plaza, right in front of the NYS Library, routes 22 and 114.

== Concourse ==
The Concourse is Albany's "Underground City" with food courts, a former McDonald's restaurant, banks, a post office, a CDTA bus station, a visitor center, and several retailers. The Concourse connects all buildings of the state plaza, and many state workers spend their lunch hour there. The Concourse also features various works of art and sculptures, part of the State collection of modern abstract art.

== Art collection ==
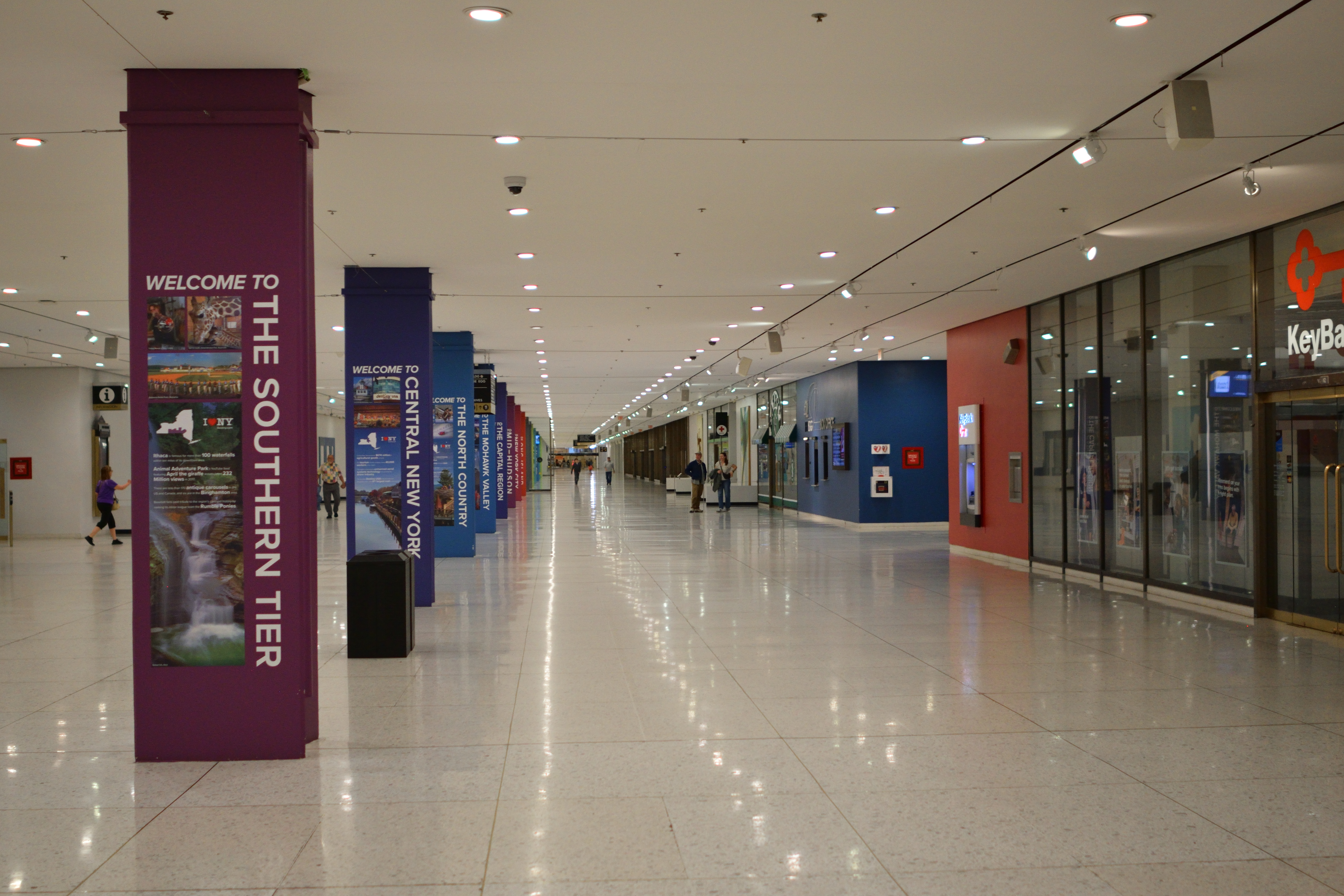
The 1/4-mile (400 m) underground corridor at the Concourse level of the plaza displays part of the Empire State Plaza Art Collection

The Governor Nelson A. Rockefeller Empire State Plaza Art Collection is located throughout the complex, within the underground Concourse, buildings, and outdoor areas. The Collection includes 92 large-scale paintings, sculptures, and tapestries at various locations. Glenn D. Lowry, director of the Museum of Modern Art in New York City, has termed the plaza's display of American art "the most important State collection of modern art in the country". The Collection has also been called "the greatest collection of modern American art in any single public site that is not a museum". The Collection represents a significant attempt to "integrate the fine arts into the lives of those who ordinarily might not be exposed to them".

The pieces in the Collection were selected by a commission appointed by Governor Nelson A. Rockefeller in 1965. The commission included Wallace K. Harrison; Robert M. Doty; René d'Harnoncourt; Seymour H. Knox, II; and (after 1968) Dorothy Miller. Governor Rockefeller reviewed and approved each artwork.

The Collection features modern artists who worked in New York State. In Rockefeller's words: "New York is the center of the contemporary movement in the (international) art world. ... [T]hese great artists should be represented in the state complex." Significantly, Rockefeller preferred modern art with no explicit social or political content: "I like strong, simple painting without a message".

There are 92 works created between 1952 and 1973 by 63 artists. Of these, 16 pieces are site-specific commissions. Artistic styles range from Abstract Expressionism to Minimalism, Pop Art, and Op Art. Thus, the Collection is "an encyclopedia of abstraction as practiced in the sixties".

Free guided tours for groups or individuals are available by appointment, and self-guided Acoustiguide tours are also available.

=== Artworks ===
Artist	Title	Year	Medium
Anuszkiewicz, Richard	Grand Spectra	1968	acrylic on canvas
Bladen, Ronald	The Cathedral Evening	1972	painted Cor-Ten steel
Bolomey, Roger Henry	Untitled	1969-71	bronze
Bolomey, Roger Henry	Untitled	1969-71	bronze
Bolotowsky, IIya	Large Tondo	1969	acrylic on canvas
Bontecou, Lee	Untitled	1966	paint, fiberglass, and leather on welded metal framework
Brooks, James	Chaco	1965	oil on canvas
Calcagno, Lawrence	Red-Black	1967	oil and acrylic on canvas
Calder, Alexander	Four at Forty-Five Degrees	1966	polychromed sheet metal
Calder, Alexander	Triangles and Arches	1965	painted steel
Callery, Mary	Z	1963	brass
Chryssa Vardea-Mavromichali	Arrow: Homage to Times Square	1958	painted cast aluminum
Coggeshall, Calvert	Touching	1968	casein on canvas
D'Arcangelo, Allan	American Landscape	1967	acrylic on canvas
Daphnis, Nassos	2-68	1968	epoxy paint on canvas
Davis, Gene	Sky Wagon	1969	acrylic on canvas
Duran, Robert	Untitled	1970	acrylic on canvas
Ferber, Herbert	Double One on C	1966	copper
Frankenthaler, Helen	Capri	1967	acrylic on canvas
Gabo, Naum	Construction in Space: Spheric Theme	1969	stainless and Cor-Ten steel
Glarner, Fritz	Untitled	1968	oil on canvas
Goodnough, Robert	Struggle	1966-67	charcoal, acrylic, and oil on canvas
Gottlieb, Adolph	Orange Glow	1967	oil on canvas
Guston, Philip	Smoker	1963	oil on canvas
Hadzi, Dimitri	Helmet V	1961	bronze
Hartigan, Grace	The-The #1	1962	oil on canvas
Held, Al	Rothko's Canvas	1969-70	acrylic on canvas
Horwitt, Will	Spaces	1969-70	cast aluminum
Jenkins, Paul	Phenomena: Mistral Veil	1970	acrylic on canvas
Jensen, Alfred	Kronos	1968	oil on canvas
Judd, Donald	Untitled	1968	stainless steel and amber plexiglass
Kelly, Ellsworth	Yellow Blue	1968	painted steel
Kelly, Ellsworth	Primary Tapestry	1968	handwoven wool
Kipp, Lyman	Wild Rice	1967	painted steel
Kline, Franz	Charcoal Black and Tan	1959	oil on canvas
Krushenick, Nicholas	Faster than Sunshine	1968	acrylic on canvas
Liberman, Alexander	Temple II	1964-69	aluminum
Lipton, Seymour	The Empty Room	1964	nickel-silver on nickel-copper
Louis, Morris	Aleph Series IV	1960	acrylic on canvas
Loving, Alvin D. Jr.	New Morning I	1973	acrylic on canvas
Lukin, Sven	Untitled	1969	enamel on wood
Mallary, Robert	Pythia	1966	plywood, fiberglass, epoxy, and painted steel
Marca-Relli, Conrad	Black Rock	1958	oil and canvas on canvas
Meadmore, Clement	Turn Out	1967	Cor-Ten steel
Meadmore, Clement	Verge	1971-72	painted Cor-Ten steel
Milkowski, Antoni	Salem 7, 1/3	1965-67	Cor-Ten steel
Mitchell, Joan	La Seine	1967	oil on canvas, quadriptych
Motherwell, Robert	Burnt Sienna	1968	handwoven wool
Motherwell, Robert	Dublin 1916, with Black and Tan	1964	oil and acrylic on canvas
Myers, Forrest	Untitled	1969-70	Cor-Ten and stainless steel
Nevelson, Louise	Atmosphere and Environment V	1966	aluminum, black epoxy, enamel
Noguchi, Isamu	Studies for the Sun	1959-64	travertine
Noguchi, Isamu	Studies for the Sun	1959-64	iron
Noguchi, Isamu	Studies for the Sun	1959-64	bronze
Noland, Kenneth	Via Ochre	1968	acrylic on canvas
Novak, Gyora	Links	1965	black lacquer on wood
Novros, David	Untitled	1968	acrylic lacquer on fiberglass
Okada, Kenzo	Hagoromo	1964	oil on canvas
Oldenburg, Claes	Geometric Mouse, Scale A, 1/6	1969	painted steel and aluminum
Parker, Raymond	Curling Red	1967	oil on canvas
Pepper, Beverly	Campond	1969-70	chrome-plated steel
Pettet, William	Untitled	1968	acrylic on canvas
Pollock, Jackson	Number 12, 1952	1952	mixed media
Rickey, George	Two Lines Oblique	1968-71	stainless steel
Rosati, James	Heroic Galley	1958	bronze
Rosati, James	Lippincott I	1967	painted Cor-Ten steel
Rosenthal, Tony	Duologue	1965	bronze
Rothko, Mark	Untitled	1967	oil on canvas
Ruda, Edwin	Tecumseh	1969	acrylic on canvas
Sander, Ludwig	Pawnee II	1968	oil on canvas
Schmidt, Julius	Untitled	1966	bronze
Segal, George	The Billboard	1966	plaster, wood, metal, and rope
Seley, Jason	Colleoni II	1969-71	welded steel
Sihvonen, Oli	Untitled	1968-69	oil on canvas
Smith, David	Voltri-Bolton III	1962	painted steel
Smith, David	VB XXI	1963	painted steel
Smith, David	Volton XIII	1963	painted steel
Smith, David	Volton XVI	1963	painted steel
Smith, David	Volton XVIII	1963	painted steel
Smith, Tony	The Snake Is Out, 1/3	1962-69	painted mild steel
Stahly, François	Labyrinth	1970-71	iroko wood
Stamos, Theodoros	Iberian Sun Box	1967	oil on canvas
Still, Clyfford	1964 (PH-558)	1964	oil on canvas
Sugarman, George	Trio	1969-71	painted aluminum
Sullivan, Jim	Sojourno	1969	aquatec on canvas
Tworkov, Jack	Wedding Flags	1965	oil on canvas
von Schlegell, David	West End	1966	aluminum
Voulkos, Peter	Dunlop	1967	bronze
Williams, William T.	Sweets Crane	1969	acrylic on canvas
Wines, James	Grey Disc	1968	painted cement and steel
Youngerman, Jack	Eastward	1967	acrylic on canvas
Zox, Larry	Gemini Series I	1968	acrylic on canvas

== Memorials ==
The Empire State Plaza has at least 15 memorials of various types, built by the New York State Office of General Services. An illustrated and annotated self-guided tour brochure is available for download.

The memorials on the plaza are as follows:

- Missing Person Remembrance
- Korean Veterans Memorial
- Women Veterans Memorial
- Purple Heart Memorial
- WWII Memorial
- Children's Memorial
- Police Officers Memorial
- Parole Officers Memorial
- Crime Victims Memorial
- Fallen Firefighters Memorial Emergency Medical Services Memorial
- Vietnam Memorial
- George Washington Memorial
- General Philip Henry Sheridan Memorial

== Controversy ==
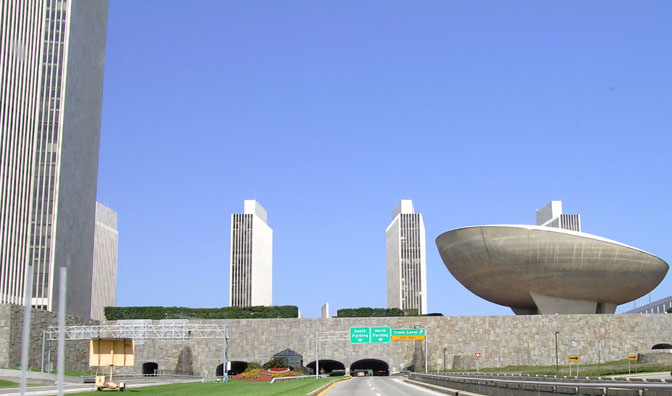
View of the plaza from the South Mall Expressway below

The complex was the subject of significant controversy around the time of its construction. About 7,000 people were evicted under eminent domain, mostly from working-class and poorer sections of older Albany. The construction of the plaza occurred during the decline of Albany's downtown shopping district, and the massive displacement of population allegedly hastened the process. Numerous restaurants, specialty shops, two major department stores, and downtown's last movie theater had shuttered by the end of construction. The majority of the displaced residents had not owned cars, and they had shopped locally. The construction of the elevated plaza separated the largely residential neighborhoods surrounding Washington Park and points west, from the largely commercial streets between the State Capitol and the Hudson River.

The plaza has also been criticized for the cost of its lavish architecture (marble and other imported stone are used throughout), its sheer size, and its period architecture. In a sharply critical 1976 The New York Times article, architectural reviewer Paul Goldberger described the complex as "a compendium of clichés of modern architecture". He further commented that "Ultimately, of course, one realizes that the entire mall complex is not so much a vision of the future as of the past. The ideas here were dead before they left the drawing board, and every design decision, from the space allocations to the overall concept, emerges from an outdated notion of what modern architecture, not to mention modern government, should stand for."

In his 1980 book, The Shock of the New, Robert Hughes refers to the buildings as being in "The International Power Style of the Fifties", comparing the buildings to those built by Fascist governments (Fascist architecture). Architecture critic Martin Filler, quoted in The Making Of Empire State Plaza, says "There is no relationship at all between buildings and site, neither at grade nor atop the podium, since all vestiges of the existing site have been so totally obliterated. Thus, as one stands on the Plaza itself, there is an eerie feeling of detachment. The Mall buildings loom menacingly, like aliens from another galaxy set down on this marble landing strip."

== Gallery ==
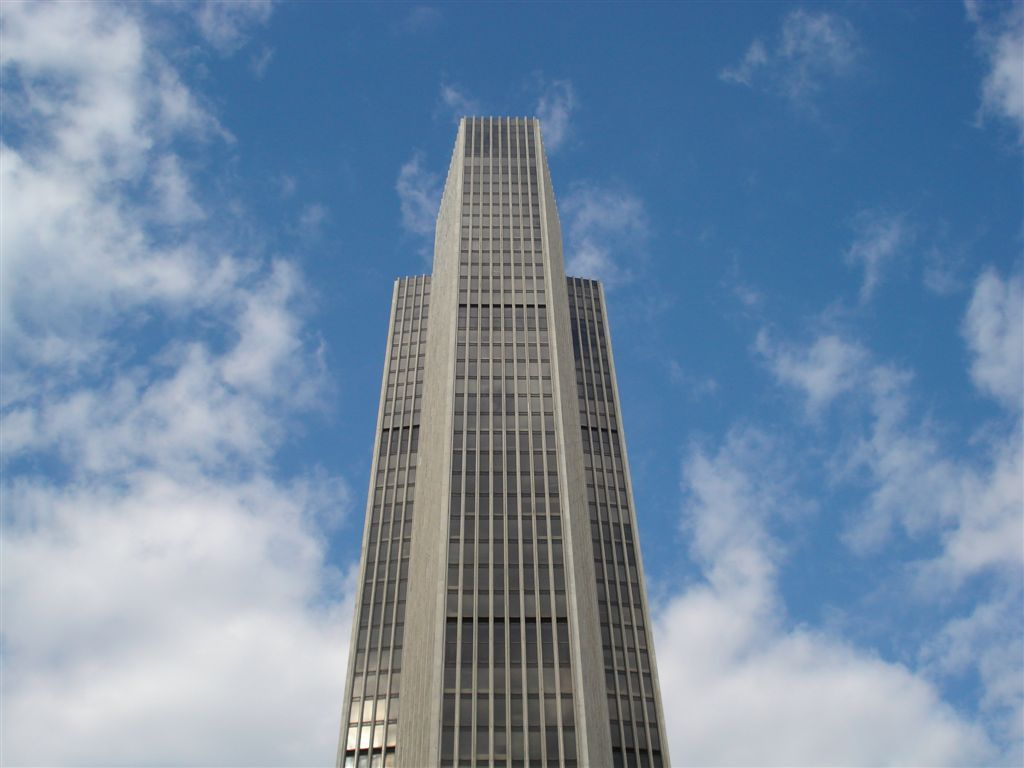
Erastus Corning Tower, viewed from Eagle Street

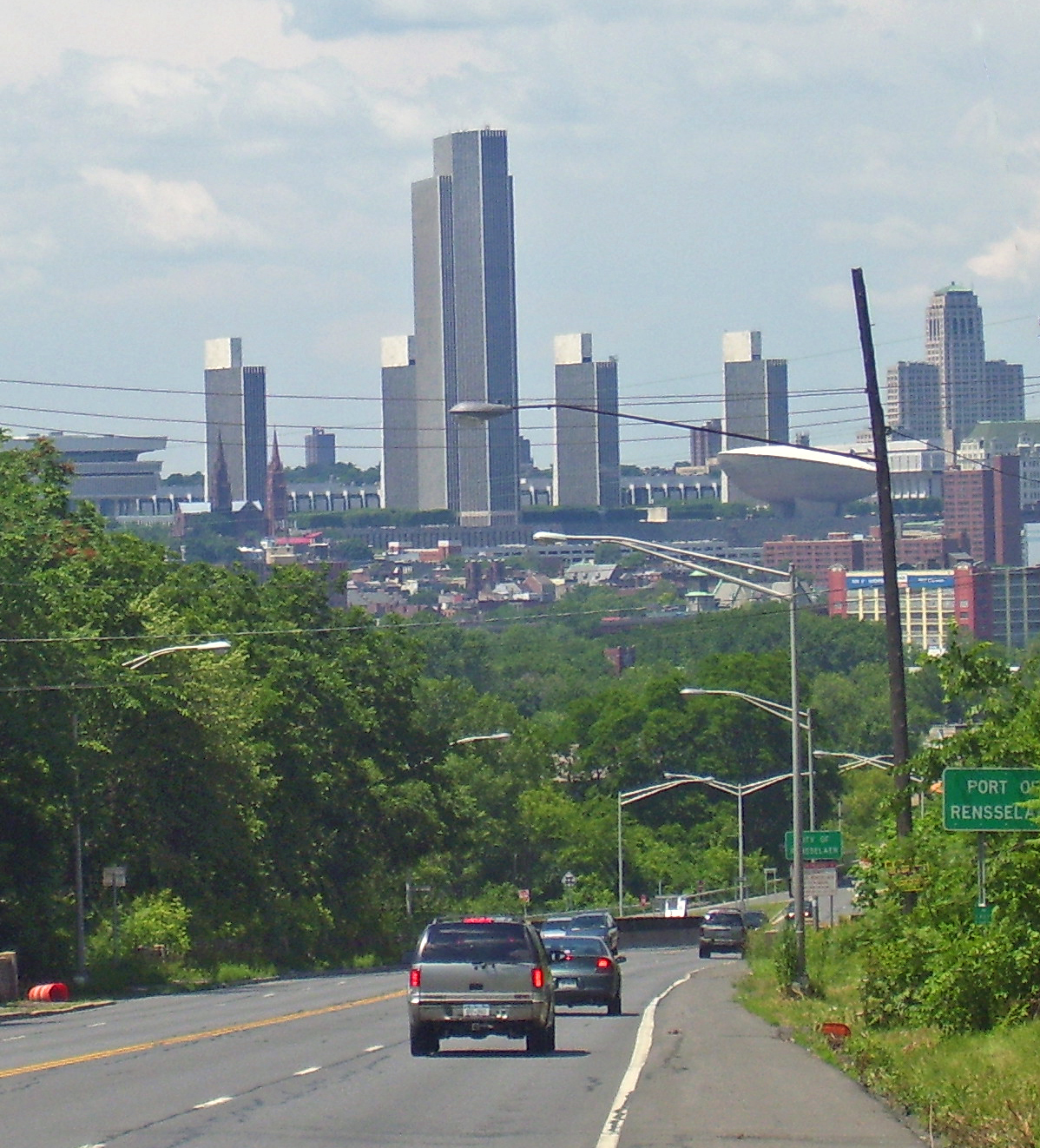
View from across river, heading west on US Route 20/north on US Route 9 in Rensselaer

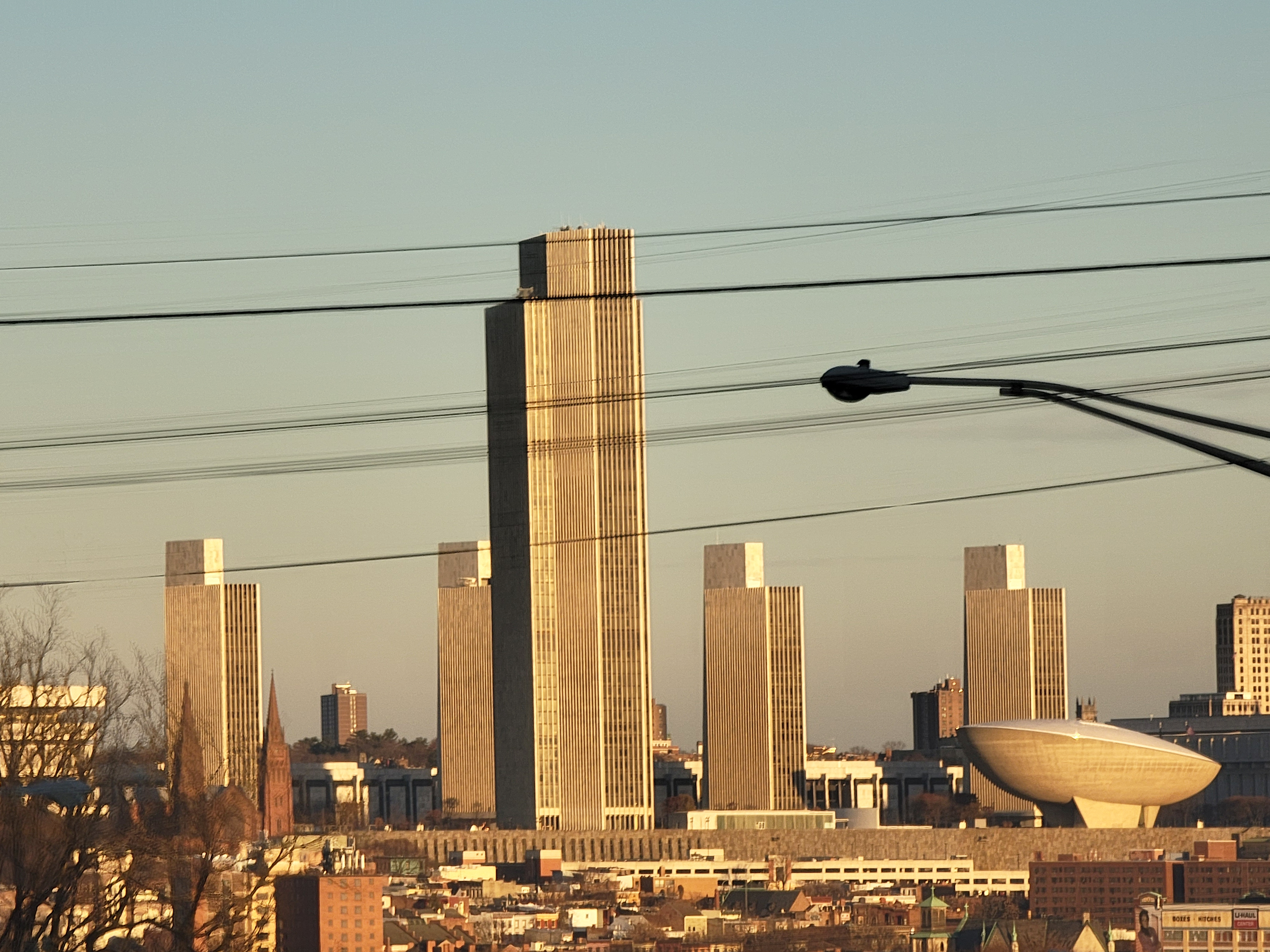
View from US Route 20 looking west from across the Hudson River in Rensselaer

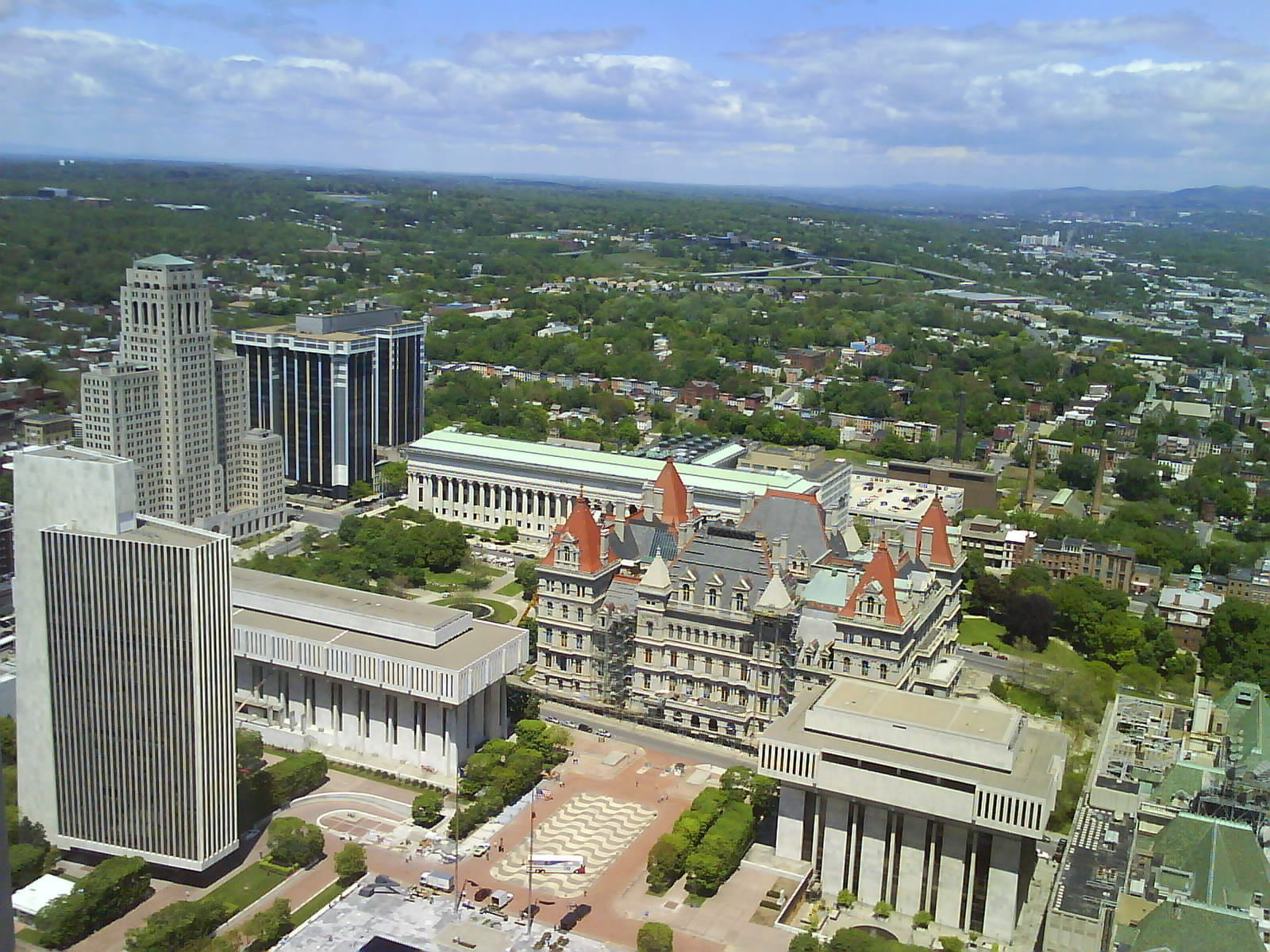
View from observation deck on the 42nd floor of the Corning Tower
Interior images of the Concourse
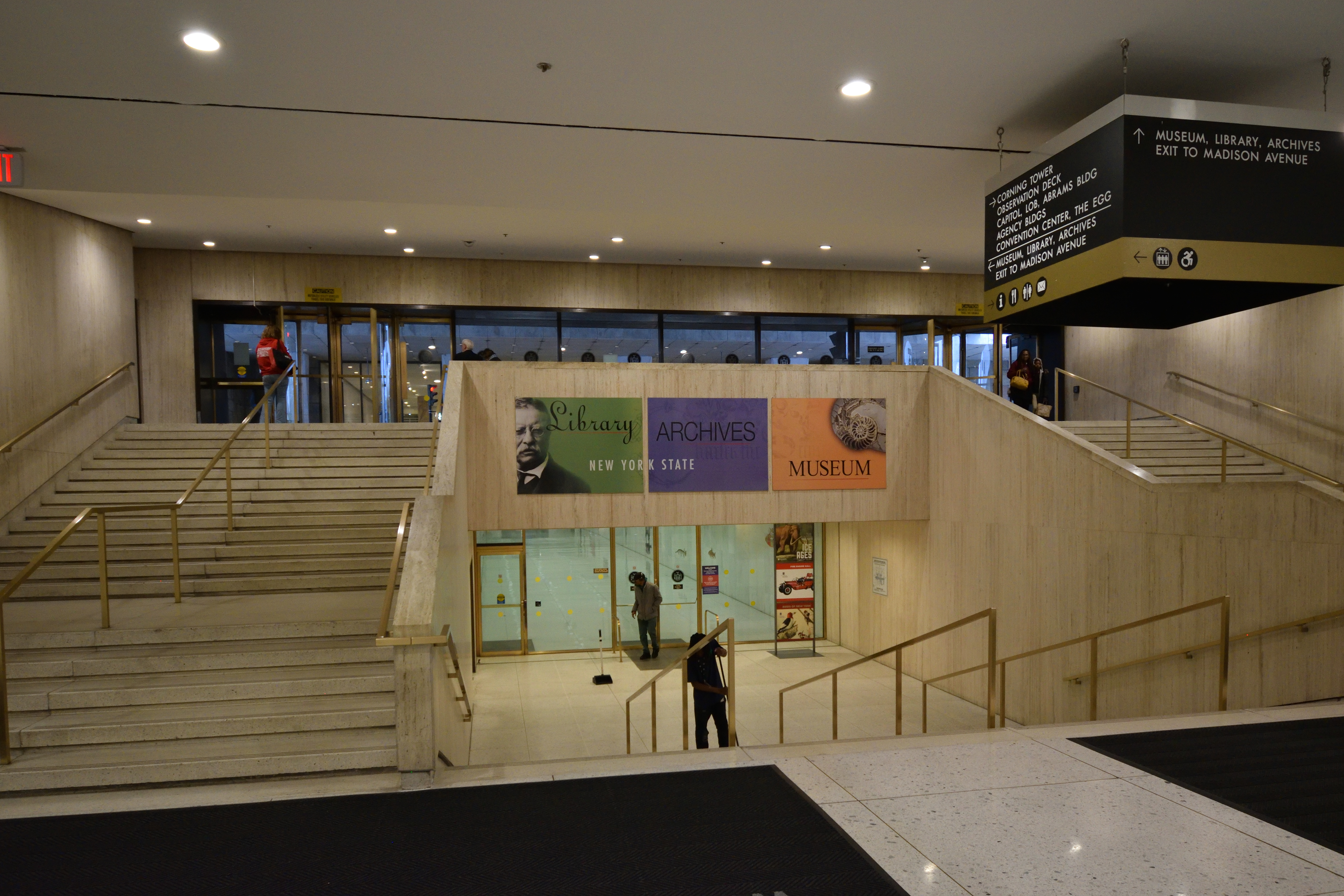
The entrance to the concourse from Madison Ave.

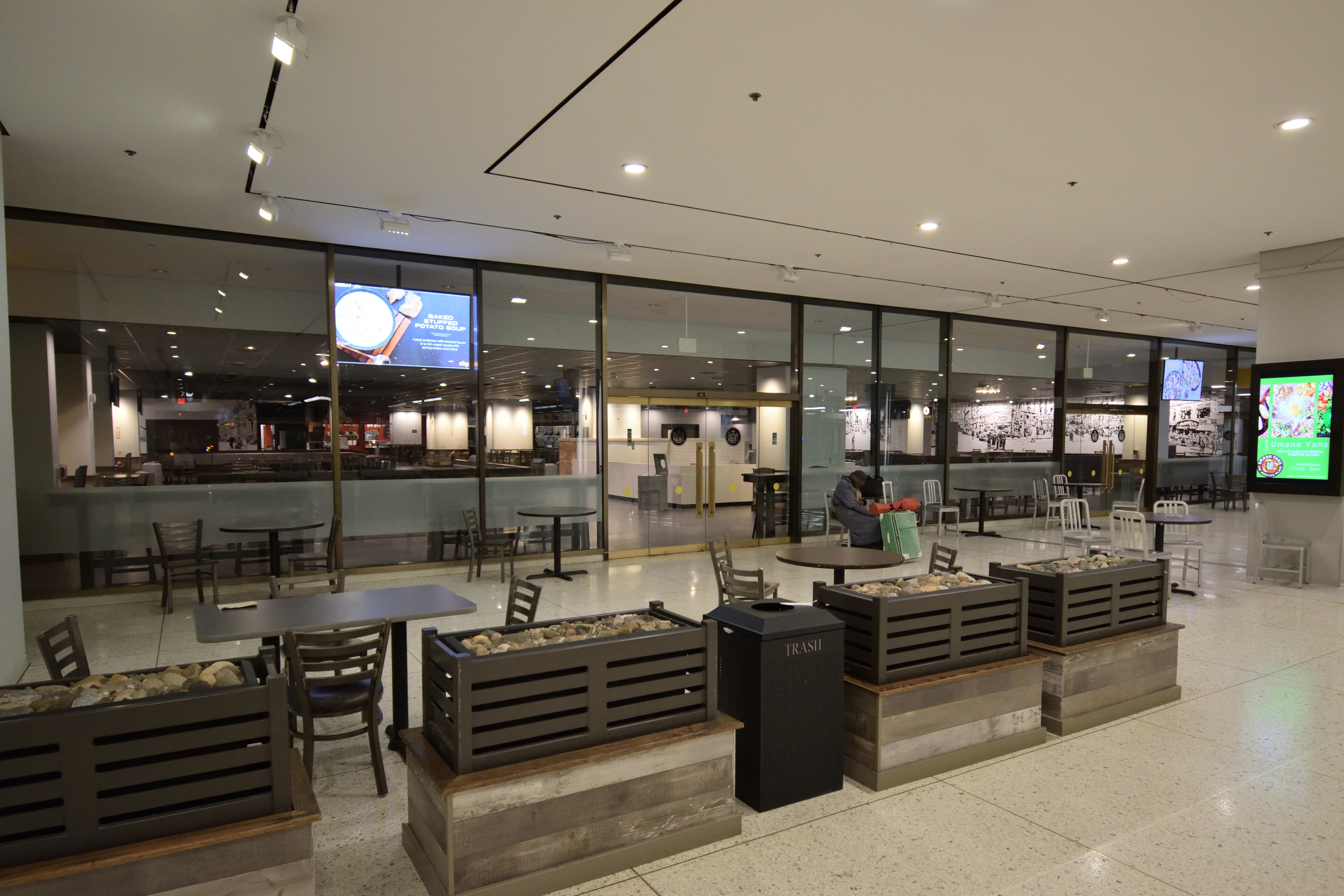
The food court in the Empire State Plaza Concourse

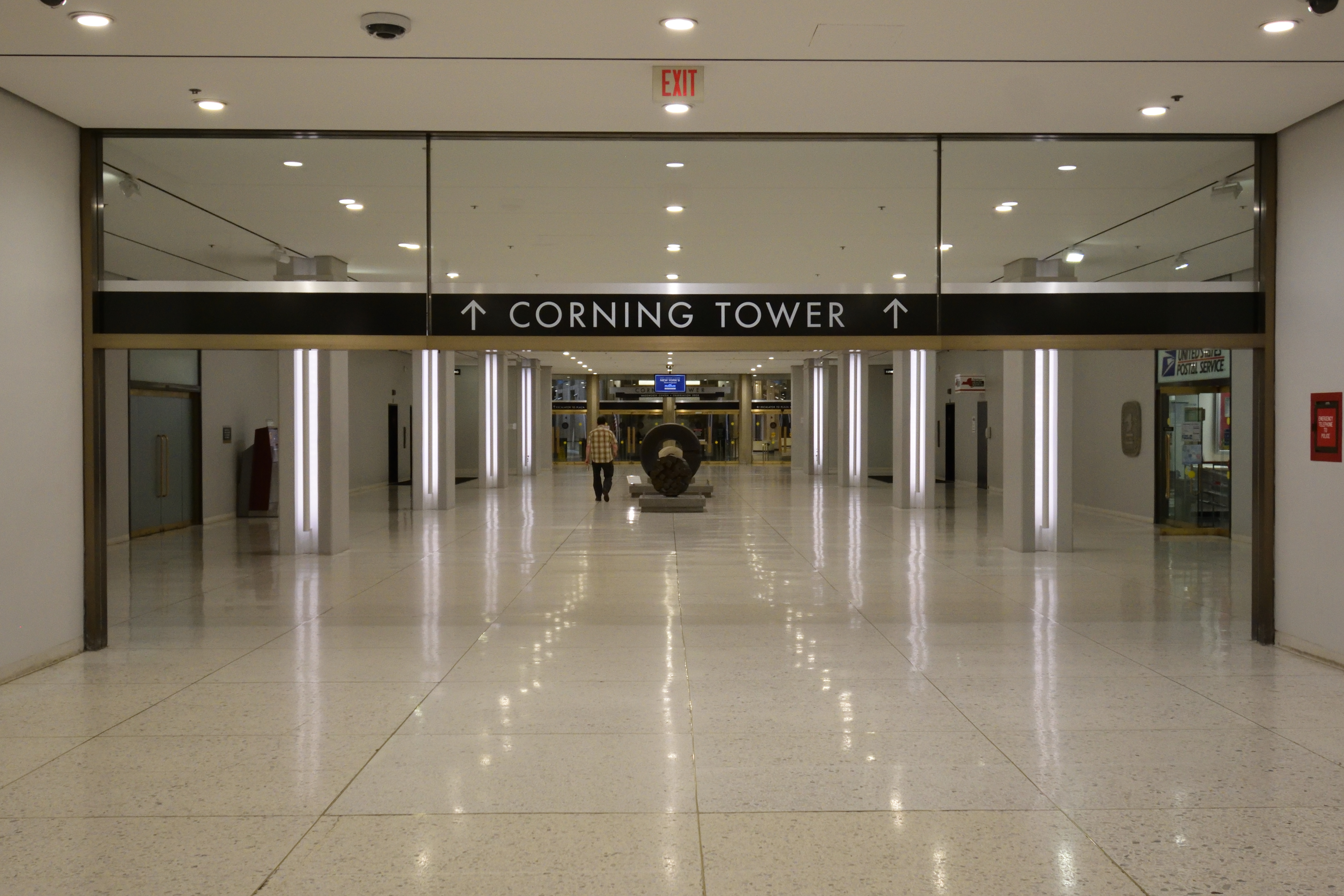
The entrance to the Corning Tower via the underground concourse

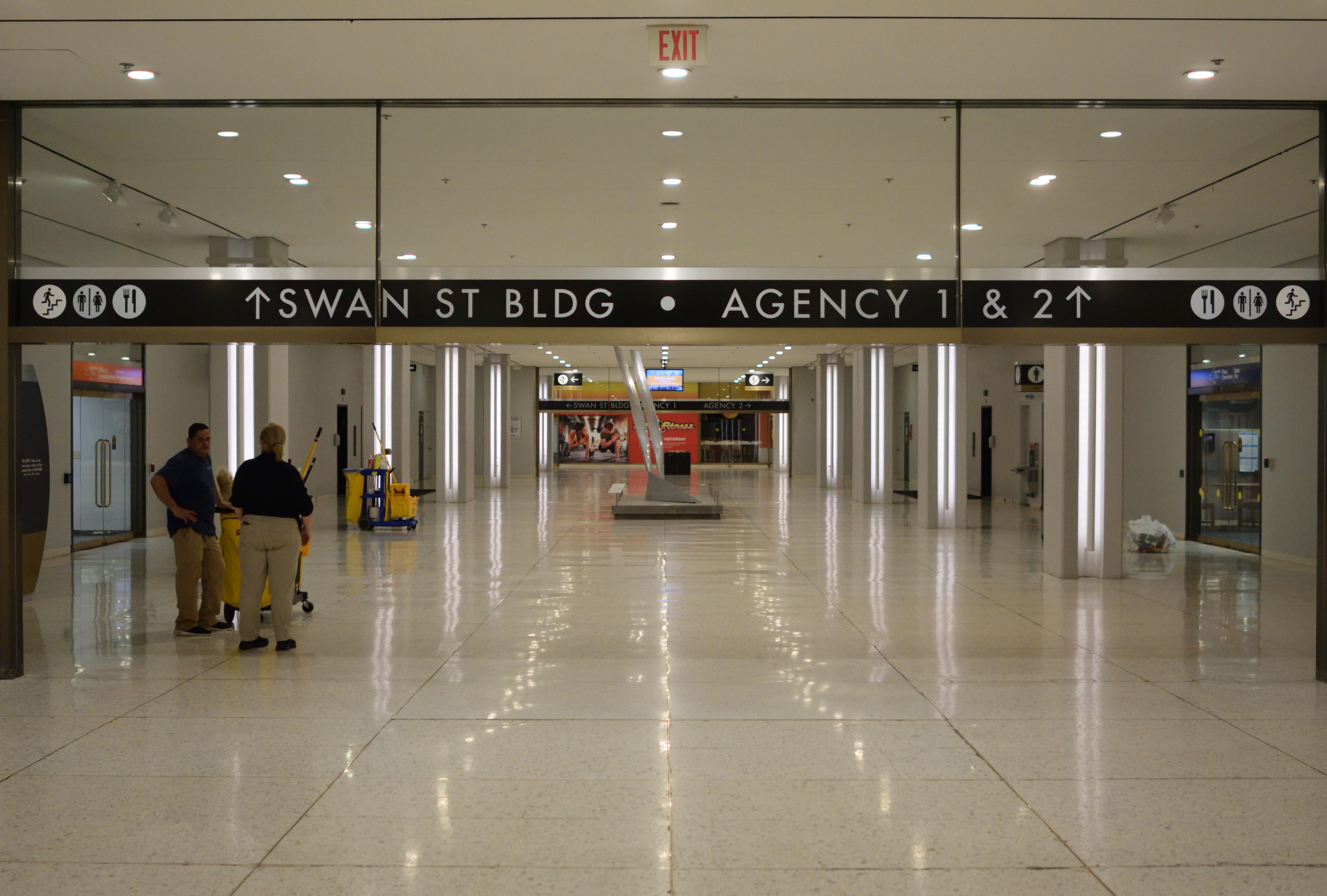
The hallway providing access to Agency Buildings 1 & 2

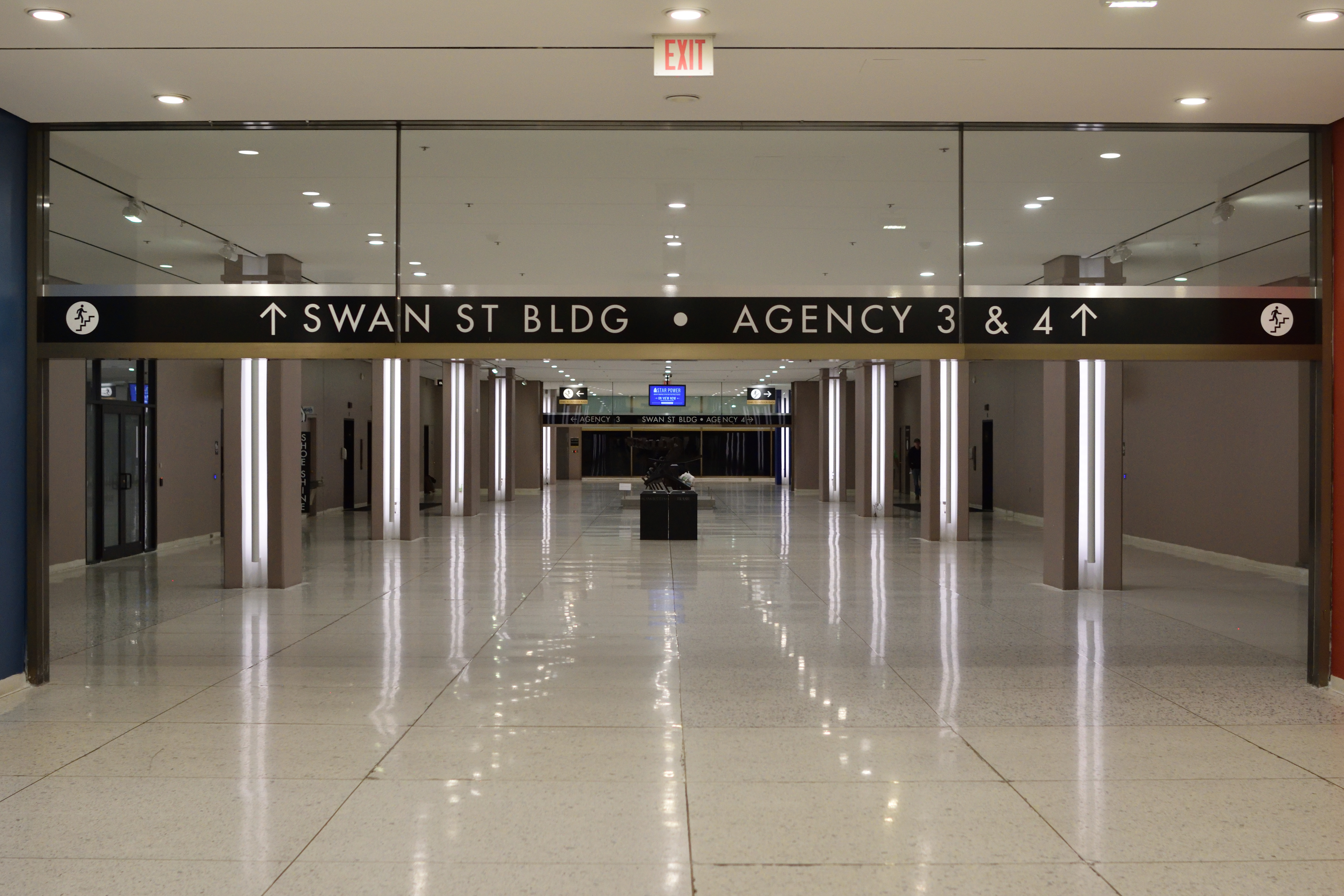
The hallway providing access to Agency Buildings 3 & 4

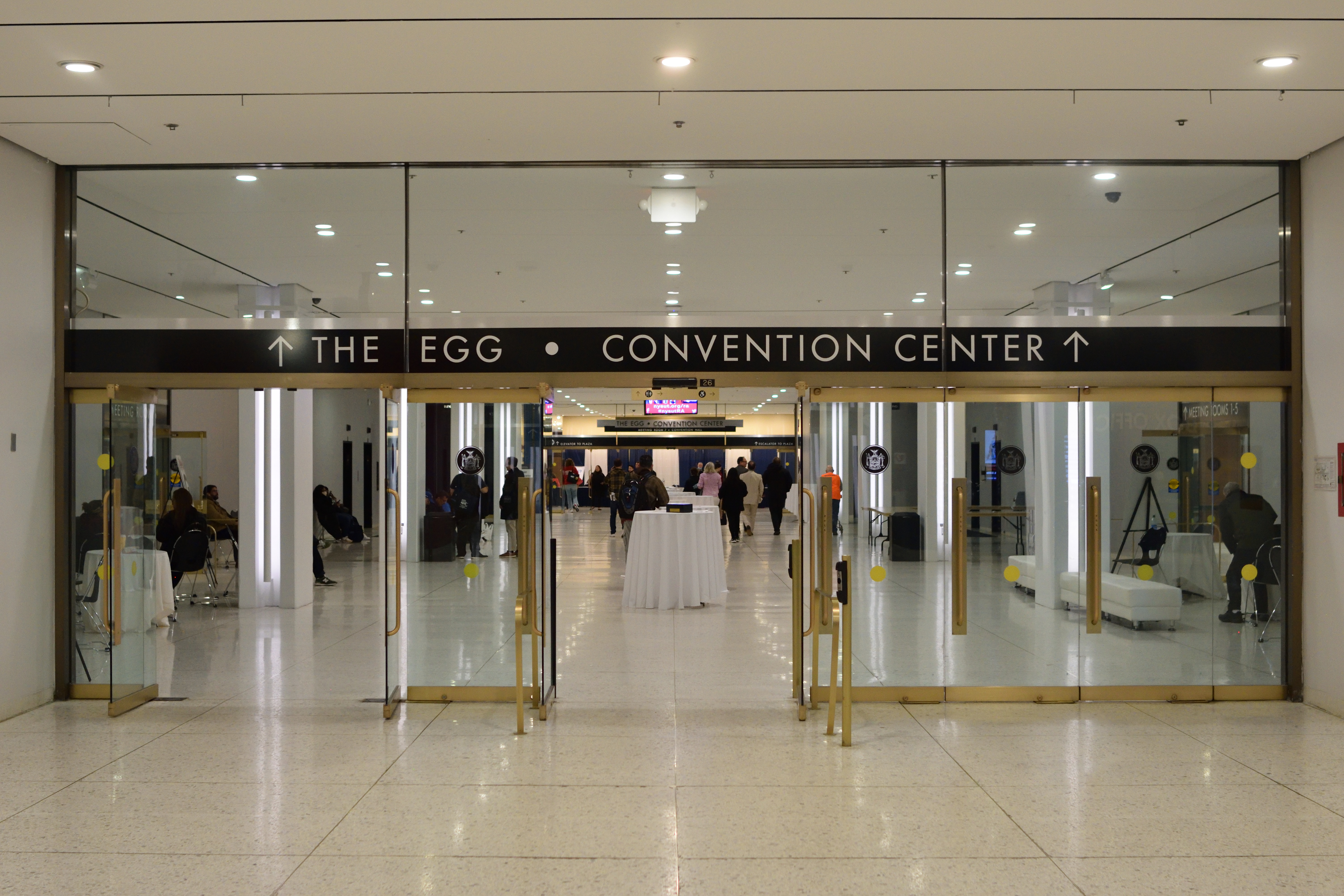
The entrance to The Egg via the underground concourse

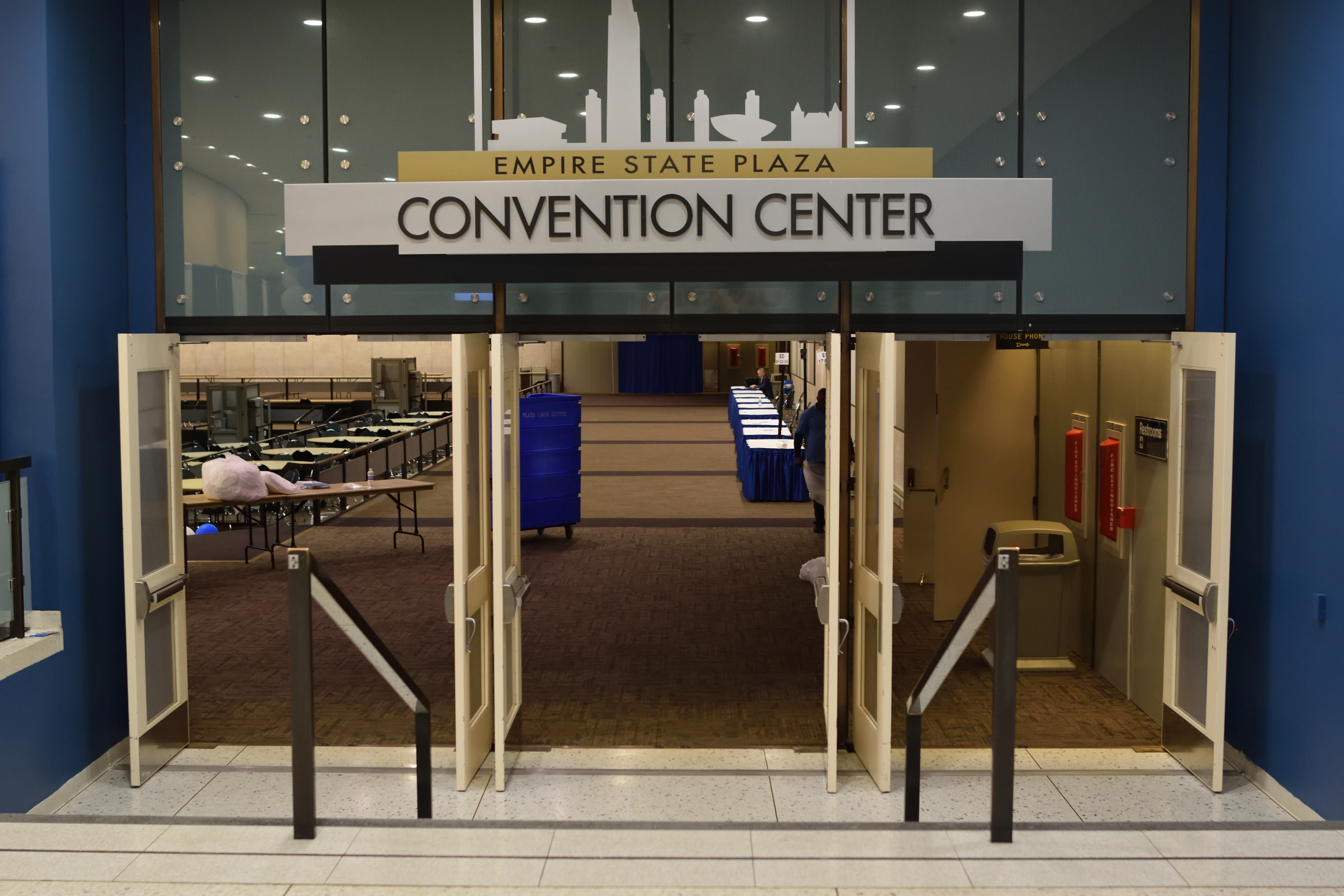
The entrance to the Empire State Plaza Convention Center

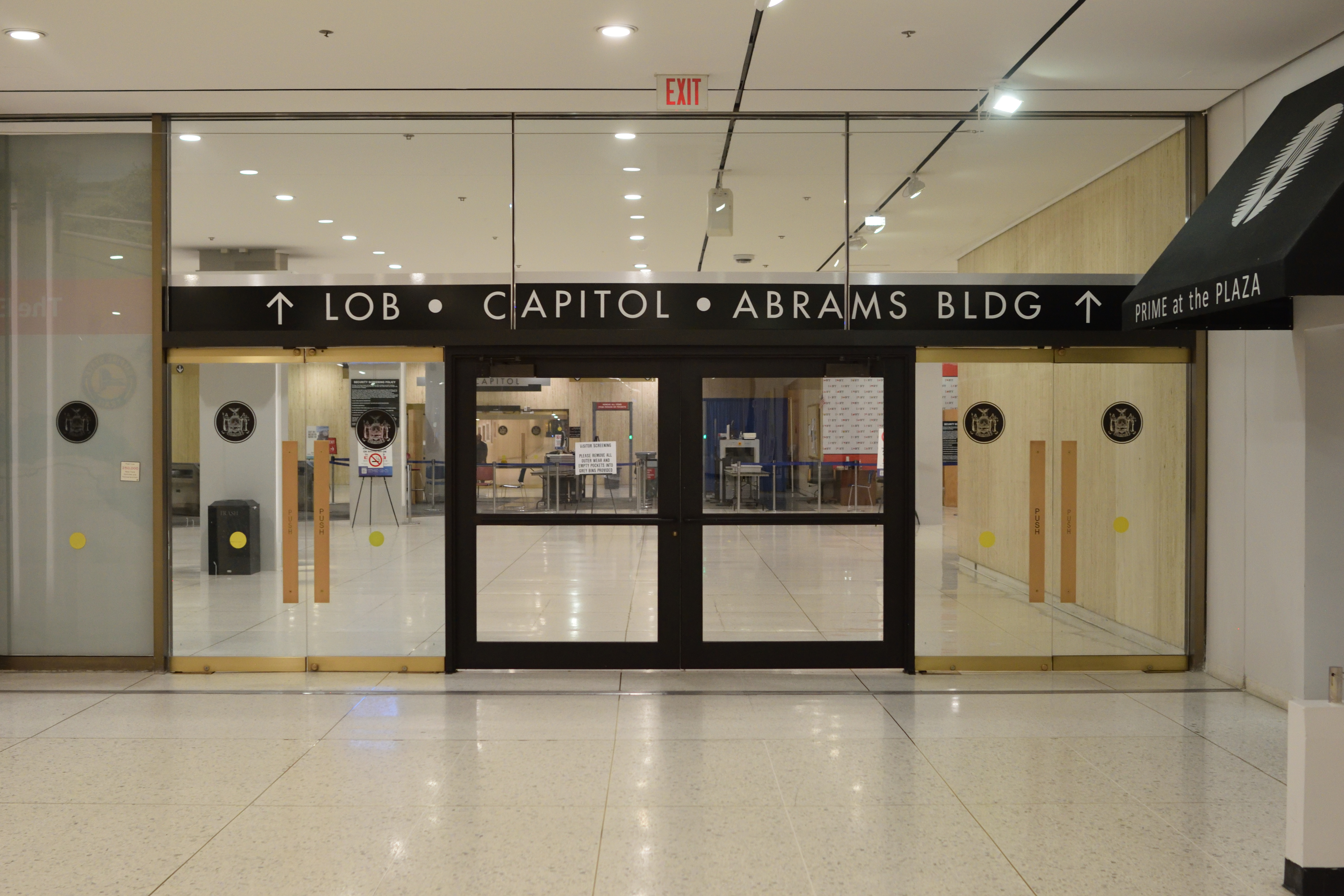
The door to access the State Capitol, Legislative, and Abrams buildings

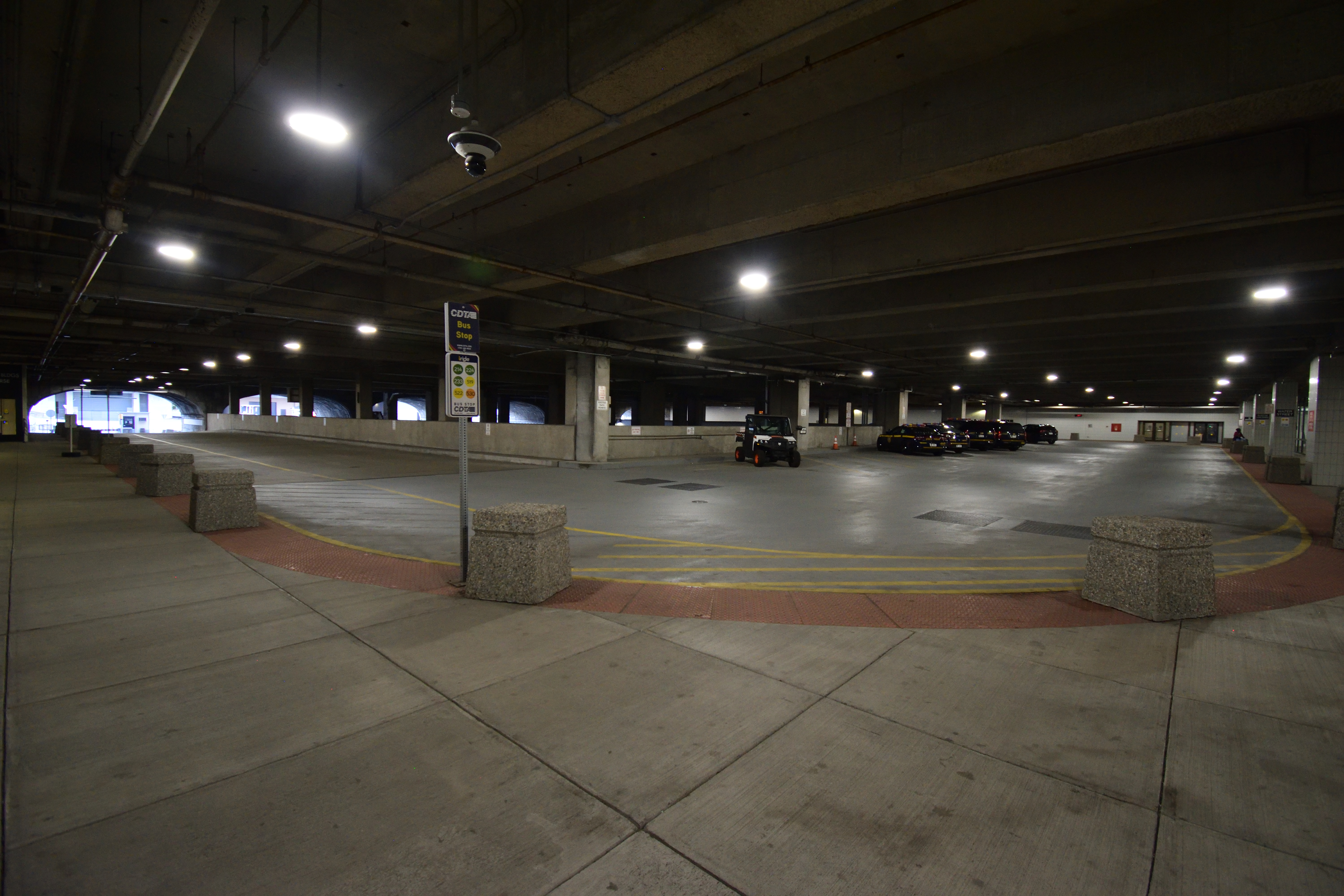
The bus station within the Empire State Plaza

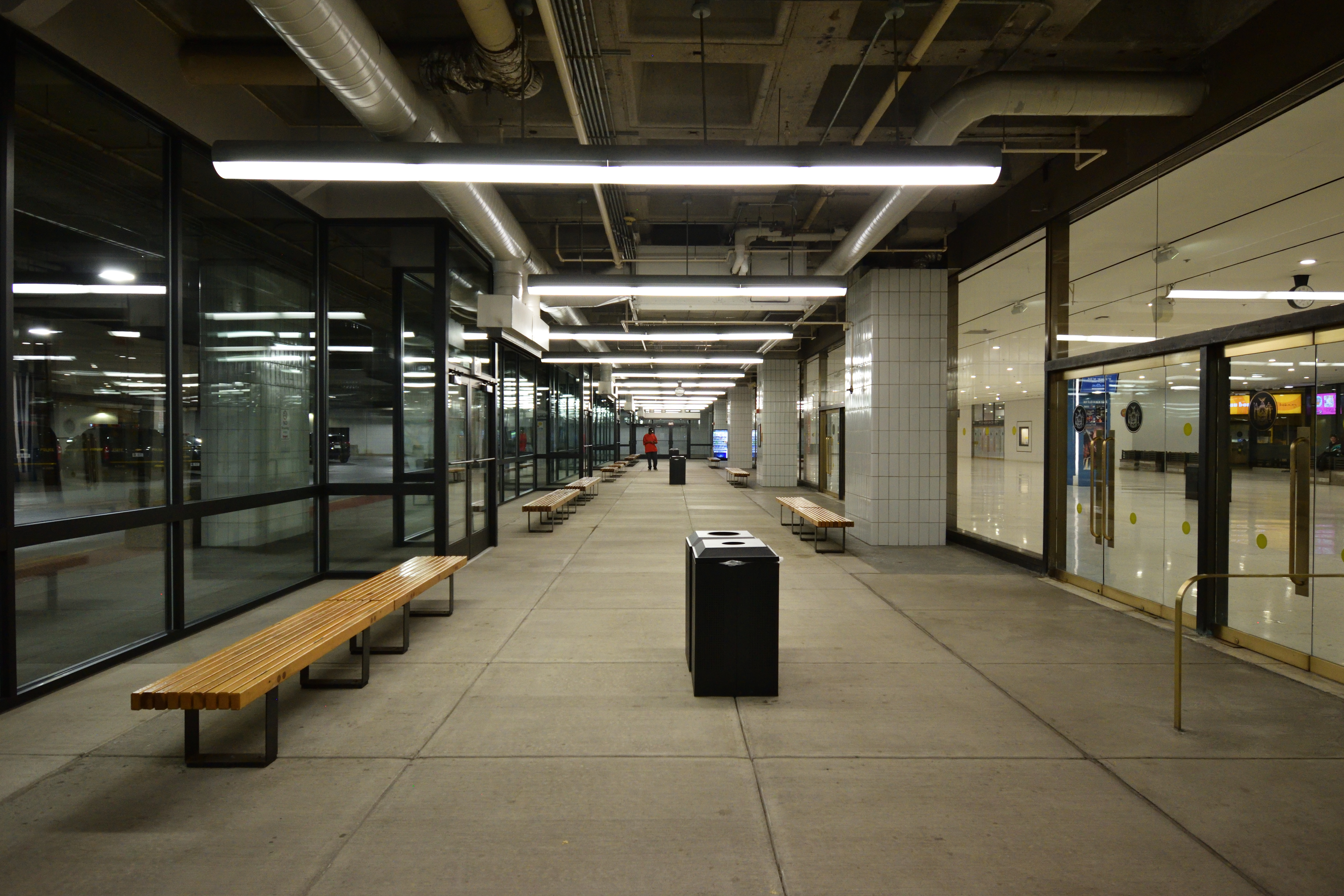
The interior of the bus station waiting area

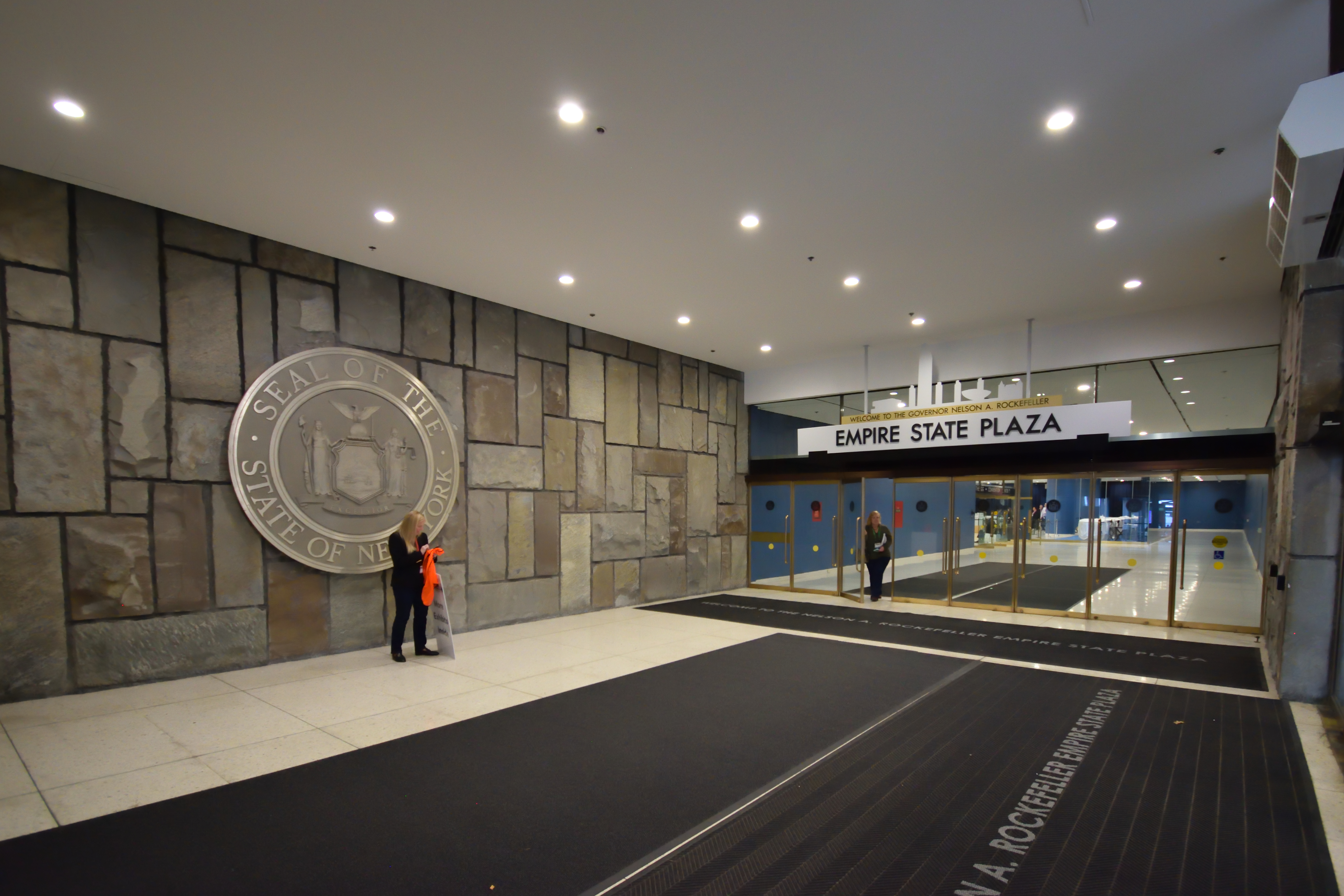
The Empire State Plaza entrance under the Egg

== See also ==
- Albany Convention Center
- Downtown Albany Historic District, adjacent area
- Hudson River–Black River Regulating District
- Port of Albany-Rensselaer
- Public art
- Underground city
- Urban renewal
