= Cultural Education Center =

Building in Albany, New York

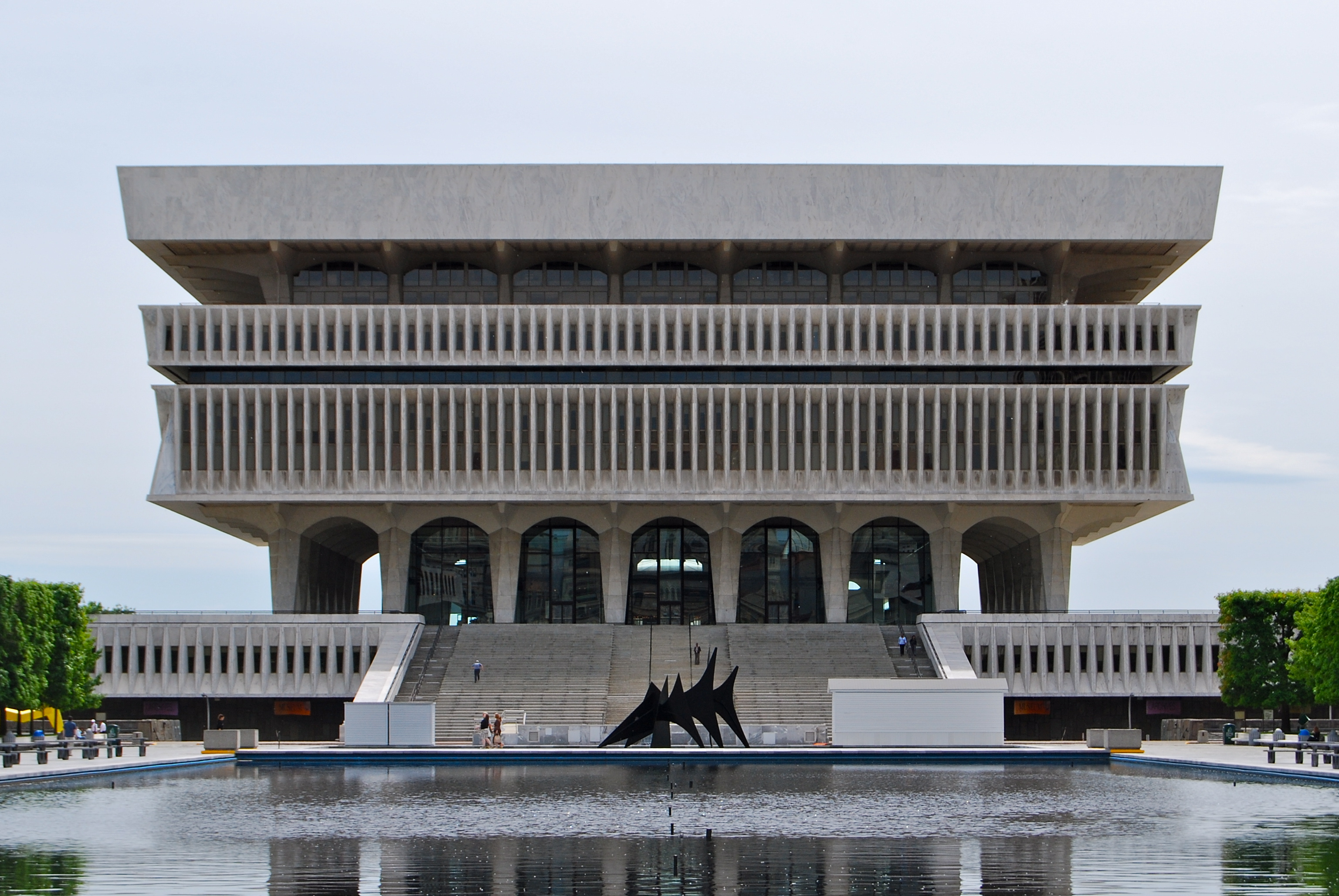
- Interactive map of the Cultural Education Center area

General information
- Architectural style: New Formalism
- Location: 310 Madison Avenue, Albany, New York, United States
- Coordinates: 42.648311°N 73.761848°W
- Construction started: 1976
- Completed: 1978

Height
- Height: 155 ft (47 m)

Technical details
- Floor count: 12

Design and construction
- Architects: Harrison & Abramovitz; Carson, Lundin & Shaw; James, Meadows and Howard

The Cultural Education Center is on the south side of the Empire State Plaza in Albany, New York. Located on Madison Avenue, it faces northward towards the New York State Capitol building. Construction of the building, which was designed in the New Formalist style, was completed in 1978.

The eleven story, 1.5 million square foot (135,000 m³) building houses the main offices of the New York State Office of Cultural Education (part of the New York State Education Department), which include the New York State Museum (floors 1-4), the New York State Archives (floor 9), and the New York State Library (floors 5-8 and 11).

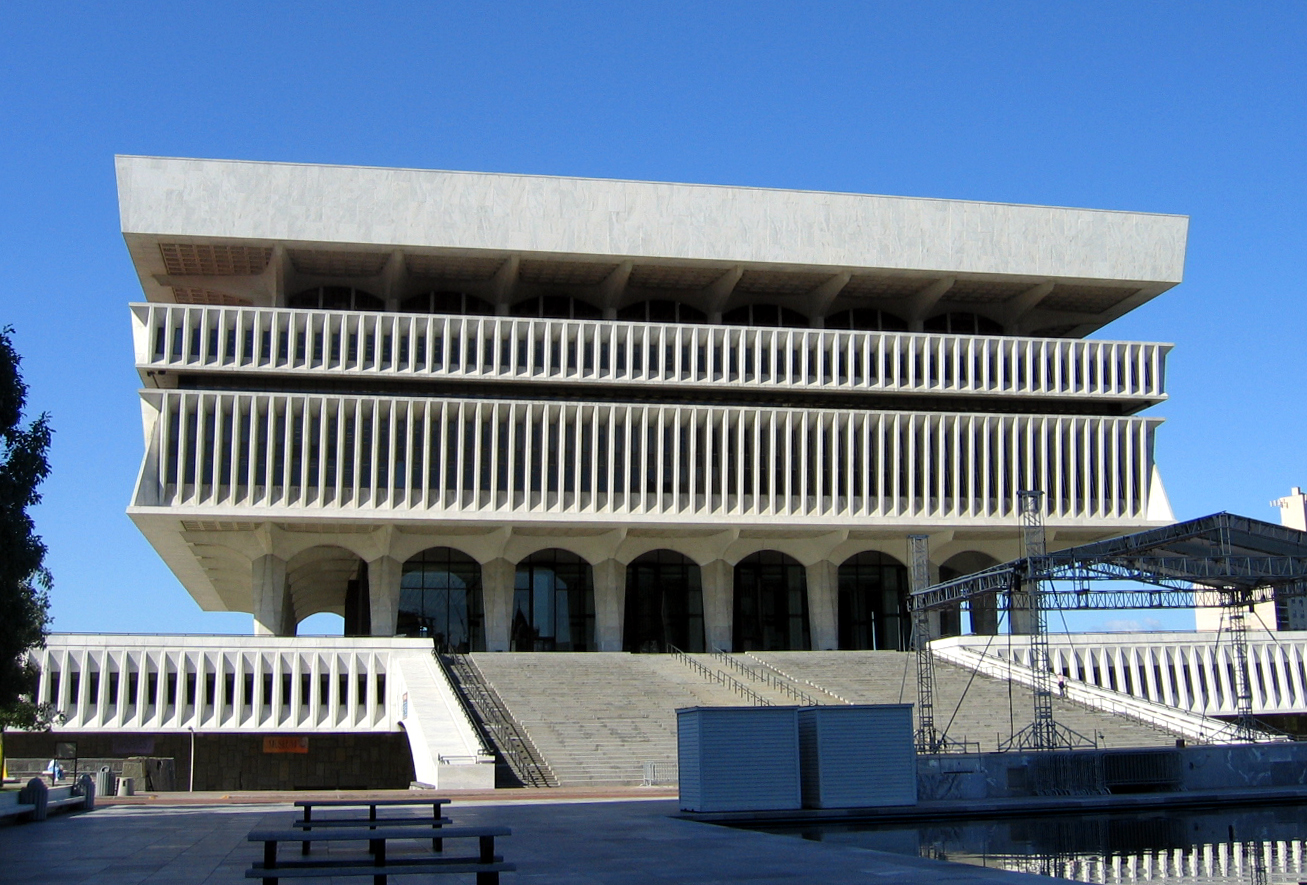
Another view of the Cultural Education Center

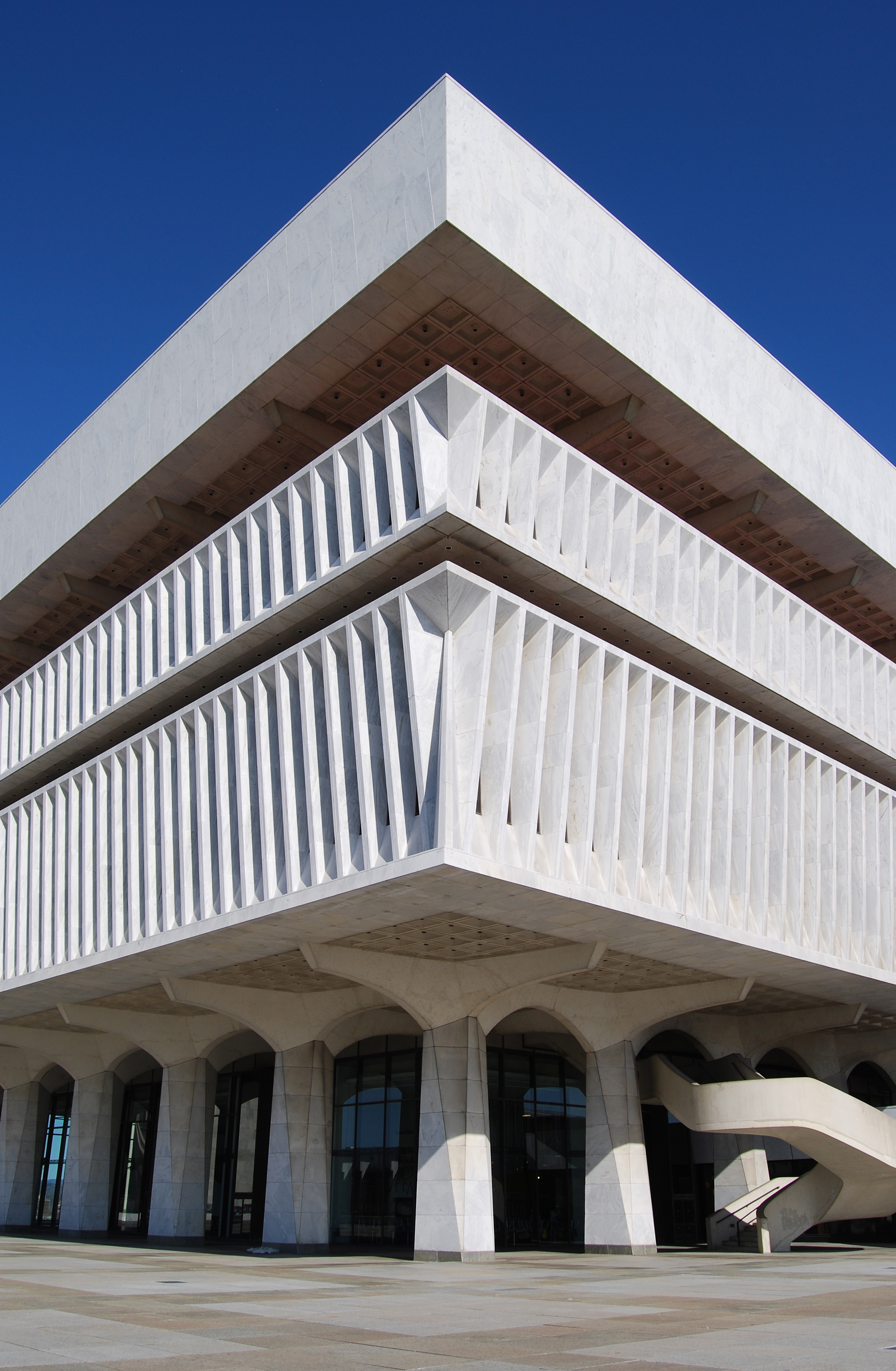
Details of New York State Museum, Albany.
