= Acoustiguide =

Coordinates: 40°45′9″N 73°59′11″W

Acoustiguide is a provider of interactive museum guides for museums, art galleries, heritage sites, and other public displays. In 2005 it merged with the Israeli company Espro Information Technologies. After Espro suffered from financial difficulties, Acoustiguide was sold to the French company Orpheo in 2025.

== History ==
Acoustiguide launched an early mobile interpretation guide in 1957, with a tour of Franklin D. Roosevelt's Hyde Park narrated by his wife, Eleanor Roosevelt. Audioguides in museums had been available in the United States since 1954, with the Guide-A-Phone system at the American Museum of Natural History. Available on then-new portable reel-to-reel players, the tour led visitors through the estate's public and private spaces, and told stories of day-to-day life and special visits by dignitaries.

In 1959, the Phoenix Art Museum was the first museum to use an Acoustiguide to interpret their permanent collection, which was narrated by Vincent Price. Cassette players were used though the 1960s and infrared and radio frequency tour systems were used in the 1970s with a specific cassette model, called the M1 player. Concurrently, AM and FM wands were introduced at Centrepoint Tower in Sydney, Queen's House (National Maritime Museum), and the Mary Rose Trust.

Acoustiguide gained popularity in museum education with "blockbuster" exhibitions in the 1980s. P2s or Panasonic XBS cassette players were bought off-the-shelf and the company built a mass charging system with custom made charging racks, in order to satisfy the increasing needs by museums.

With this increase in demand, the company opened offices in Europe and Asia, which included one of the first American-based companies to be opened in Mainland China (at Beijing's Forbidden City). In 1993, Acoustiguide created digital wands with "random access tours" which allowed visitors to choose the objects they wanted to learn more about and to go at their own pace in a sequence of their own choosing. These players debuted at the Louvre, in Paris.

== Current technology ==
Acoustiguide offers digital audio and multimedia interpretative tours via a variety of platforms including smartphones, multimedia MP3 players, radio transmission systems and the internet, as well as proprietary hardware and software guiding solutions designed and manufactured specifically for the cultural and tourism markets. Acoustiguide also offers Acoustiguide Mobile, a multimedia app for iOS and Android smartphones and tablets. Acoustiguide's products are solid state and include keypads to allow visitors to choose content appropriate to their location in the exhibit, as well as additional material such as multimedia and video vignettes. Acoustiguide technology is in use at hundreds of sites worldwide

=== Inform ===
The first digital wand player which allowed for 'random access' tours. Still used in some institutions throughout the United States.

=== Denon ===
In 1996, Acoustiguide and Denon co-created the second generation of digital players. These are used infrequently.

==== AG 2000 ====
The third generation of digital random access audio equipment was launched in 2000. It came with the ability to use it as a wand or with headphones, increased memory capacity, MP3 sound, customized data collection, LCD screens, features for individuals with disabilities and the ability to update via the internet. This model is no longer available for new purchases, but can be found in a few locations throughout the United States.

==== exSite ====
Four models of exSite have been launched since 2000. Each exSite unit is wand-based and capable of collecting data about the use of the tour via a survey. exSite units are still sold by Acoustiguide.

==== Opus ====
Launched at the Museums and Heritage Show in 2007, it comes in two models: Click (with keypad) and Touch (with touch screen). Both have color screens and provide audio content, images, video, photos, animation and maps. Both can be used as a wand or a headset player. This is the most popular unit available as of 2016.

== Offices ==
Acoustiguide is owned and managed by the Orpheo Group. The Group operates worldwide through 7 subsidiaries and a network of distributors with offices in New York, London, Paris, Brussels, Berlin, Amsterdam, Salzburg, Madrid, Tel Aviv, Taipei, Sydney, St. Petersburg, Prague, Mexico City, Shanghai, and Tokyo. The company's list of clients include New York's MoMA and the UN visitor center, San Francisco's Asian Art Museum, Paris’ Musèe du Louvre, Musée d’Orsay, and Galeries Nationales du Grand Palais, London's Westminster Abbey and the Tower of London, Jerusalem's Israel Museum, Taipei's 101 Tower, Beijing's National Museum of China, and Sydney's Opera House.

== Celebrity narrators ==
- Laurie Anderson, American experimental performance artist, composer and musician
- Mario Batalli, American chef, writer, restaurateur and media personality
- David Bowie, English musician, actor and record producer
- Tom Brokaw, American television journalist and author
- Steve Buscemi, American actor, writer and film director
- Jimmy Carter, 39th President of the United States and 2002 Nobel Peace Prize recipient
- Joan Chen, Chinese actress, film director, screenwriter and film producer
- Bill Clinton, 42nd President of the United States from 1993 to 2001
- Walter Cronkite, anchorman for the CBS Evening News for 19 years
- John Goodman, American film, television, and stage actor
- Neil Patrick Harris, American actor, singer, director, producer and magician
- Dustin Hoffman, American actor with a career in film, television, and theatre
- Jeremy Irons, English actor
- Steve Martin, American actor, comedian, author, playwright, producer, musician and composer
- Vincent Price, American actor, well known for his distinctive voice
- ?uestlove, American drummer, DJ, music journalist, record producer and frontman for The Roots
- Eleanor Roosevelt, longest serving First Lady of the United States from 1933 to 1945
- Liev Schreiber, American actor, producer, director, and screenwriter
- Sissy Spacek, Academy Award-winning American actress and singer
- DJ Spooky, electronic and experimental hip hop musician
- Meryl Streep, American actress who has worked in theater, television, and film

== Competitors ==
Systems such as Acoustiguide's, and those of competitors Tour-Mate, ArtTours , and Cuseum, are identified as providing "industrial-strength systems that can be used as audio guides in museums and other cultural heritage sites and support typically a very wide range of human languages (reaching 20 or more.)"

Among competitors, there is another company, which was set up in Italy in 1959, almost at the same time as Acoustiguide and which is still active in the digital interpretation field: D'Uva www.duva.eu. Even later in 2017 the small start-up in Hamburg named iridea is founded which creates innovative guides for audio, video or AR using object or picture recognition as well as beacon- or GPS-signals for triggering the content of the POI.
