= Port of Albany–Rensselaer =

Port in United States

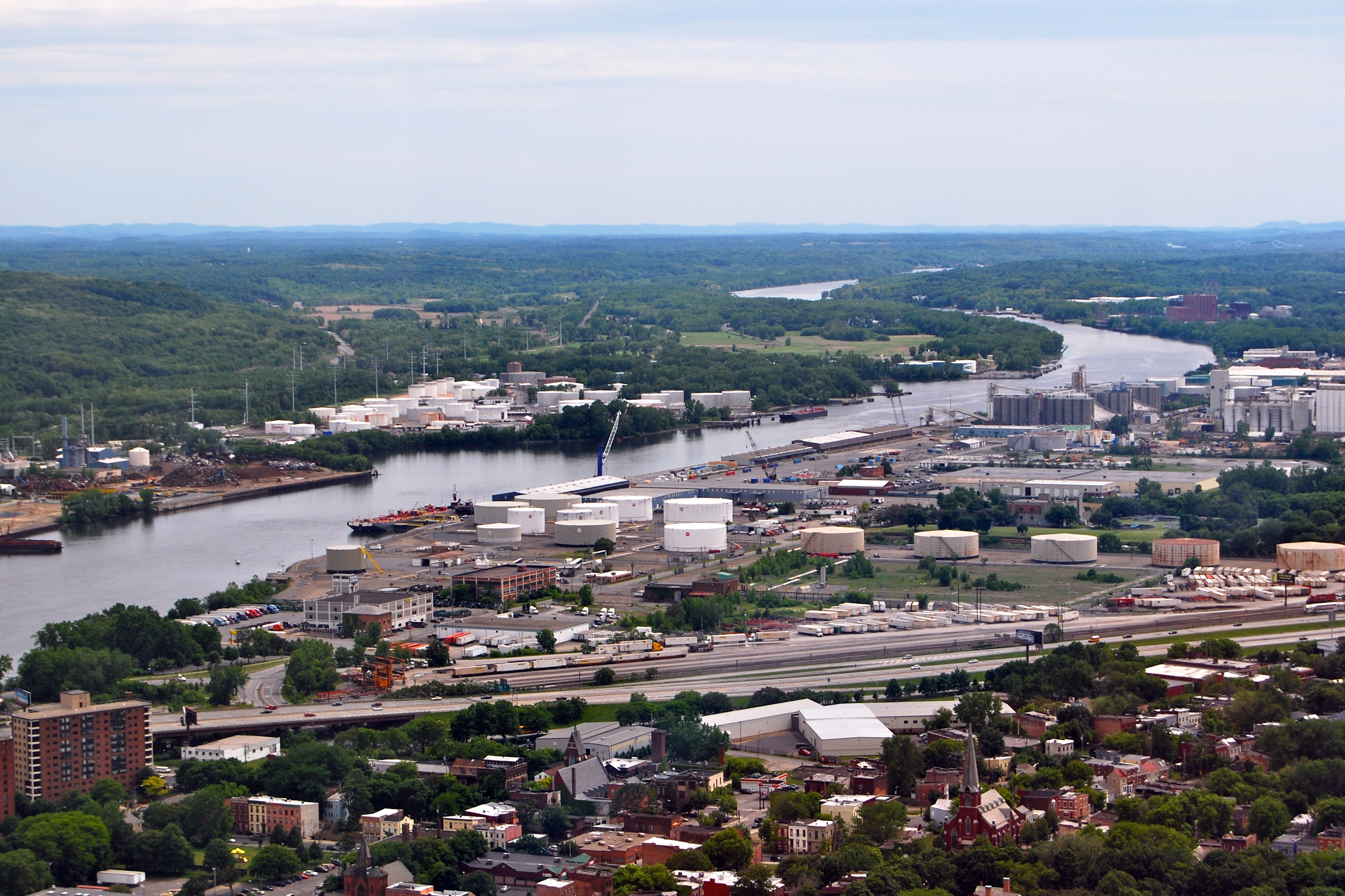
- View of Port of Albany–Rensselaer from the Corning Tower
- Interactive map of Port of Albany–Rensselaer
- Location within New York

Location
- Location: Hudson River; Albany and Rensselaer, New York
- Coordinates: 42°37′41″N 73°45′27″W
- UN/LOCODE: US ALB

Details
- Opened: 1932
- Operated by: Albany–Rensselaer Port District
- No. of berths: 18
- Draft depth: 38 ft.
- Commission Chairperson: Georgette Steffens
- Secretary: Dominic Tagliento
- Treasurer: Joseph E. Coffey, Jr.
- Manager: Richard Hendrick

Statistics
- Annual cargo tonnage: 7,540,535 (2004)
- Website www.portofalbany.us

The Port of Albany–Rensselaer, widely known as the Port of Albany, is a port of entry in the United States with facilities on both sides of the Hudson River in Albany and Rensselaer, New York. Private and public port facilities have existed in both cities since the 17th century, with an increase in shipping after the Albany Basin and Erie Canal were built with public funds in 1825.

The port's modern name did not come into widespread use until 1925; the current port was constructed in 1932 under the governorship of Franklin D. Roosevelt during the Great Depression. It included the largest grain elevator in the world at the time. Today the grain elevator is the largest in the United States east of the Mississippi River; the port has the tallest harbor crane in the state of New York.

The port has rail connections with the Albany Port Railroad, which allows for connections with CSXT and CP Rail. It is near several interstates and the New York State Canal System. The port features several tourist attractions as well, such as USS Slater, the only destroyer escort still afloat in the United States.

== Geography ==
The Port of Albany consists of roughly 236 acres (96 ha), including about 202 acres (82 hectares) in Albany and 34 acres (14 hectares) in Rensselaer. It is 124 nautical miles (230 km) north of New York Harbor. From New York Harbor to the Federal Dam three miles (4.8 km) north of Albany, the Hudson River is an estuary of the Atlantic Ocean. The Hudson has a deep water shipping channel 400 feet (120 m) across, and at Albany the river is 700 feet (210 m) across with a maximum 31 feet (9.4 m) fresh water draft and a mean range of tides of 4.7 feet (1.4 m). The port is at sea level.

== History ==
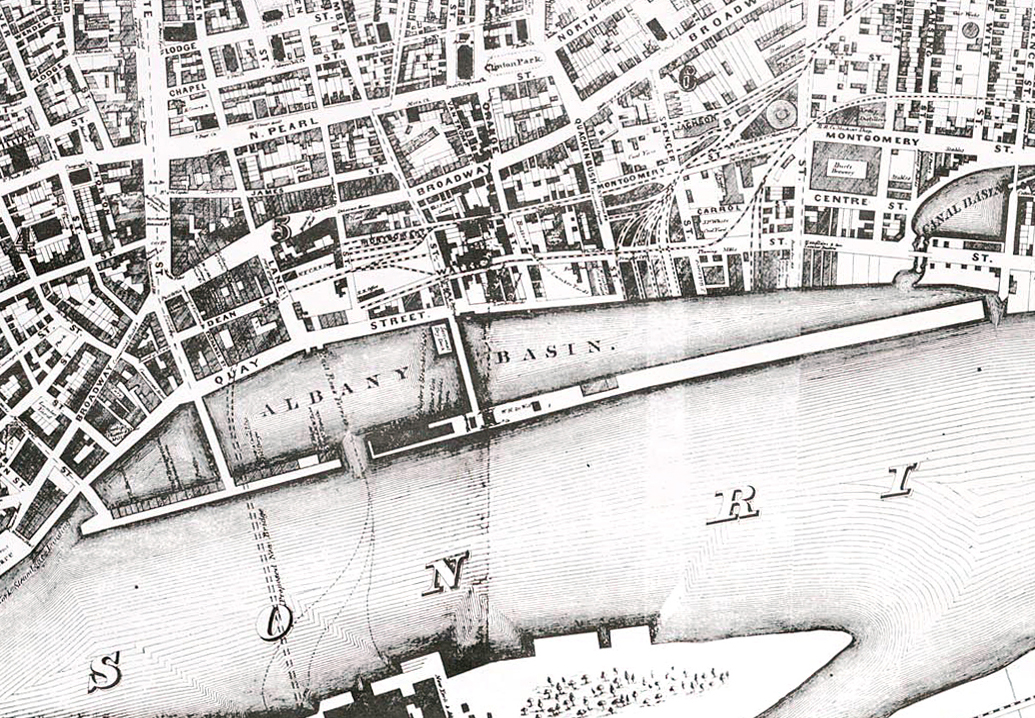
Map of the Albany Basin in 1857

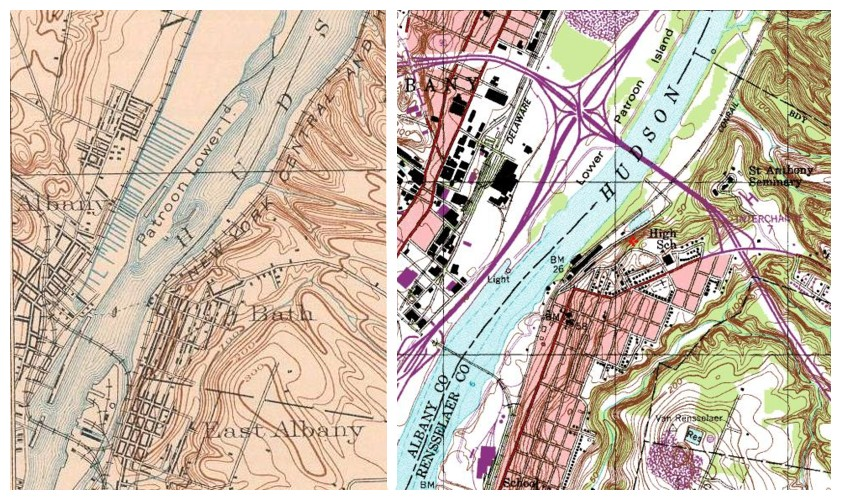
Albany Basin and Erie Canal before 1960 on left/I-787

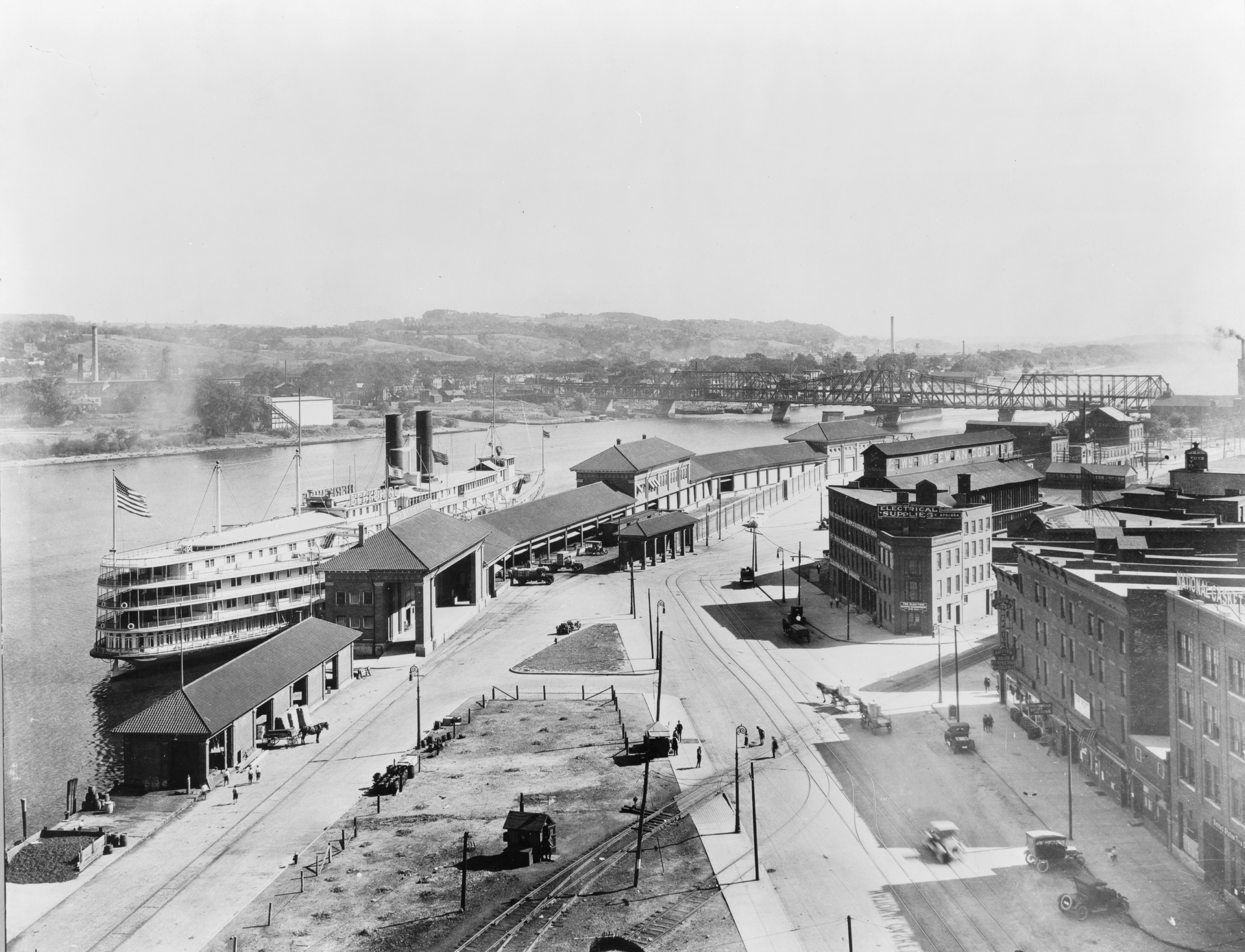
Steamboat at Albany in 1921, Dunn Memorial Bridge in distance

Since the founding of Albany in 1614 as a trading post, shipping has been important to its growth and prosperity. Furs (especially beaver), timber, and farm produce were important exports while European people and goods were shipped in. The Dongan Charter, which established Albany as a city, made Albany the exclusive market town in the upper Hudson River Valley. From its beginning, the port consisted of hastily built docks built every spring and destroyed every winter by erosion, flooding, ice, and tidal action. Three city-owned docks were established in 1766, the northern and southern ones later being expanded into wharves.

Many historically significant ships used Albany as their home port. Experiment left Albany in 1785 to become the second American ship to sail to China. In 1809 Robert Fulton's Clermont became the first commercially viable steamboat when it left Albany and sailed down the Hudson to the city of New York. In 1825 a 4,300-foot (1,300 m) long and 80-foot (24 m) wide pier was constructed 250 feet (76 m) from, and parallel to, Albany's shoreline. Along with two bridges the pier enclosed roughly 32 acres (13 ha) of the Hudson River as the Albany Basin. The construction of the pier and bridges cost $119,980. The basin was located where the Erie Canal, constructed between 1818 and 1825, met the Hudson River. The basin could accommodate 1,000 canal boats and 50 steamboat moorings. Along the Erie Canal within the city's North Albany neighborhood private wharves and slips were constructed for use in the lumber trade, this soon became the large and prosperous Albany Lumber District of national importance. In 1860 Albany, along with nearby Watervliet and Troy, was the largest lumber market in the state. The Maiden Lane Bridge was constructed in 1871 over the basin to connect Albany with the east side of the river, it was open to railroad traffic only.

The Albany Port District was established in 1925 under New York law Chapter 192. This was only four years after the interstate compact that created the Port of New York Authority (later renamed the Port Authority of New York and New Jersey). In 1932 Governor Franklin D. Roosevelt unveiled a modern port to replace the aging infrastructure of the Albany Basin and the lumber district along the Erie Canal in the North Albany neighborhood. The port was constructed on around 200 acres (0.81 km^{2}) on Westerlo Island in the southern end of Albany along with approximately 34 acres (140,000 m^{2}) across the river in the city of Rensselaer. The grain elevator at the port, built during the original construction in 1932, was the largest in the world and as of 2008 is still considered to be the largest in the United States east of the Mississippi River. The area of Albany's original port (the Albany Basin) has been covered by Interstate 787 and the Corning Preserve (Riverfront Park) since the very early 1970s. In 1979 remnants of the basin wall were excavated from the preserve's lagoon by Phillip Lord working for the New York State Museum.

A Master Plan adopted in 2000 called for the port to be transformed into a container port, which led to the purchase of the largest harbor crane in the state. In 2002, the Port District Commission took the lead in the development of Albany's Riverfront Park in the Corning Preserve as part of a development to enhance Albany's access to the river. The port helped in financing the project and in the construction of two bulkheads which have seasonal floating docks attached. In a 2005 audit, the Office of the State Comptroller questioned the port's involvement in the construction and financing. Two issues raised were the port district's lack of authority to build docks for non-commercial use and that the port would receive no income for facilities it was financing. The port received $3.3 million in 2002 to upgrade and become a member of the Inland Distribution Network, a select group of ports that are used as satellite locations for the distribution of container cargo from the Port Authority of New York and New Jersey, resulting in less congestion at downstate ports and highways.

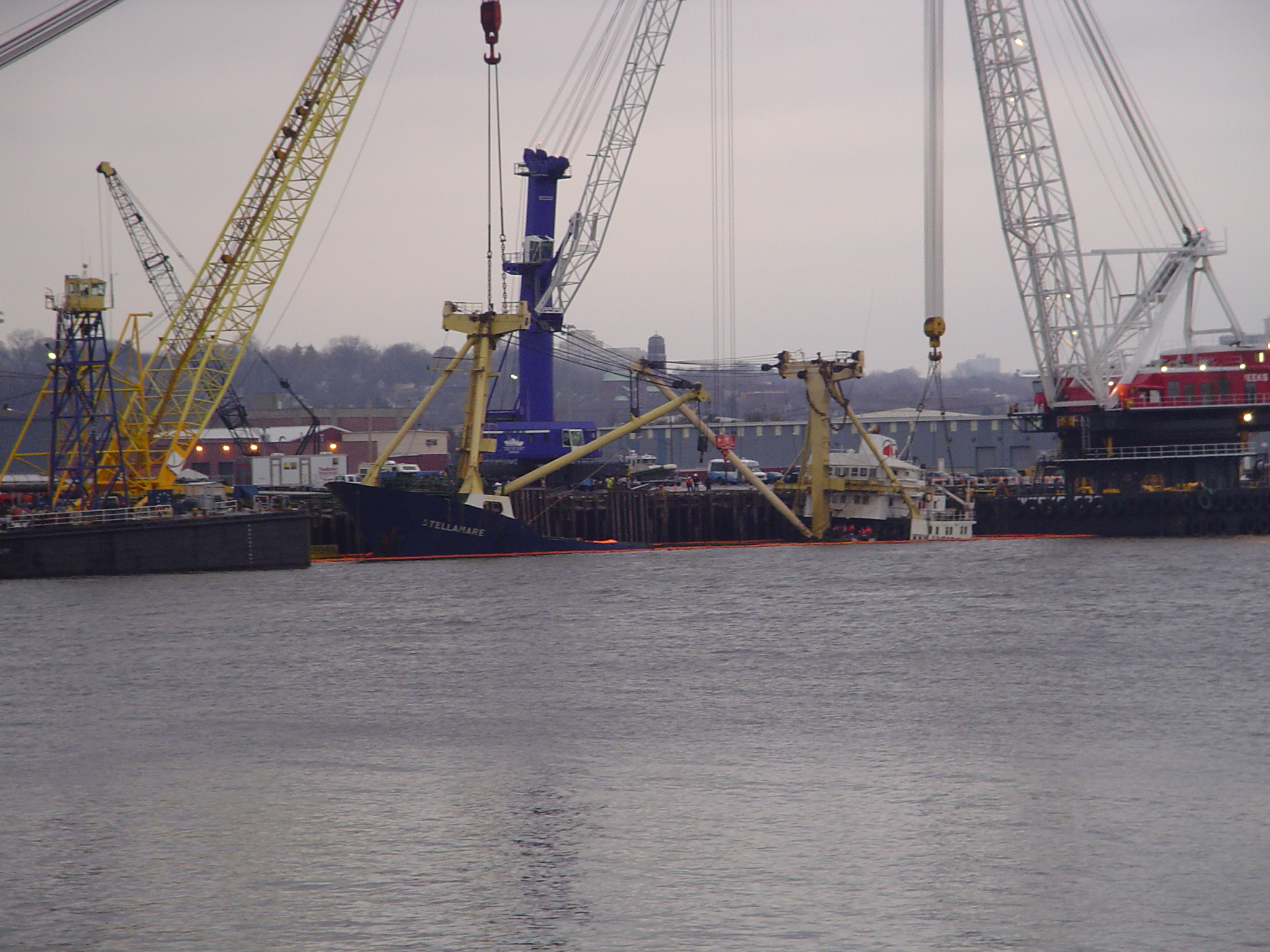
Stellamare capsized at the Port of Albany–Rensselaer.

On December 9, 2003, the Dutch-owned ship Stellamare capsized at the port, killing three Russian crewmembers. The ship was hauling General Electric generators when it overturned. The United States Coast Guard determined that poor communication resulting from the supervisors speaking Dutch while the crew spoke Russian, with English being used as a relay, was a contributing factor to mismanagement of ballast tanks. In the early spring of 2008 a port employee was arrested for stealing copper. This in turn led to investigations of employee theft which resulted in the arrest of an operations manager and a maintenance foreman for larceny. In 2008 the port received two awards from the Railway Industrial Clearance Association. One award was for customer satisfaction and the other for being the most improved port in the United States for handling heavy lift cargo.

=== Future ===
The Port of Albany is replacing 500 feet (150 m) of wharves at a cost of $7.6 million in 2008 and 2009. In late March 2008 a proposal for a $350 million ethanol plant was approved by the Albany Port District Commission, but the project has been held up due to financing issues.

As of 2021, the site was scheduled as a potential assembly area for offshore wind turbine towers.

== Governance ==
The Albany Port District Commission is a New York State public-benefit corporation created by the state of New York to develop and manage port facilities anywhere in the cities of Albany and Rensselaer. The commission has five members, four of which are nominated by the mayor of Albany and one is nominated by the mayor of Rensselaer. The governor of New York then appoints them to three-year terms. The commissioners serve without pay, but are compensated for business related expenses. The General Manager of the port commission is Richard J. Hendrick. The commission is considered to be a unit of the city of Albany and is included in the city's financial statements. Any deficit in the finances of the port commission are assessed against both Albany and Rensselaer. In 1932 the state decided that any deficit assessment would be based on Albany owing 88% of the total and Rensselaer 12%. In 2017, the commission had operating expenses in the amount of $5.98 million, no outstanding debt, and a staff level of 55 people. In 2005 the commission had a staff of 35 employees: eight in administrative duties, five in maintenance, and 22 as part-time security.

== Economy ==
The Port of Albany and the private companies located there bring to the Capital District's economy $428 million in direct spending and 1,382 jobs; in 2015 the Port was supporting 4,500 jobs across the state and contributing $800 million to the economic output of the region. The port has a U.S. Customs office as it is a port of entry. The Albany Port Customs District includes all of the following counties: Albany, Columbia, Delaware, Fulton, Greene, Montgomery, Otsego, Rensselaer, Saratoga, Schenectady, Schoharie, Warren, and Washington; along with the parts of Dutchess, Sullivan, and Ulster counties north of 41° 42' N. latitude. The 35 acres (140,000 m^{2}) on the Rensselaer side of the port is site C of Foreign Trade Zone number 121. A significant amount of the port is part of New York's Empire Zone program, which gives port tenants breaks on state income tax along with various benefits and tax breaks from the city of Albany.

== Connections ==
The Port of Albany is roughly 260 miles (420 km) east of Buffalo, 225 miles (362 km) south of Montreal, 175 miles (282 km) west of Boston, and 135 miles (217 km) north of the city of New York which makes it a location for regional distribution in the Northeastern United States and parts of Canada. As part of the Inland Distribution Network, the Port of Albany has a twice-weekly barge service to and from the Port Authority of New York and New Jersey terminals. Shipments into the port can leave through many modes of transportation, including by truck and rail. Albany International Airport is 15 minutes away with cargo facilities. Canals allow for further water transportation on barges further into the interior of North America. The port also handles commodities that are not carried on ships. Grain, molasses, animal feed, wood pulp, and steel often go from inbound trains to outbound trucks.

=== Rail ===
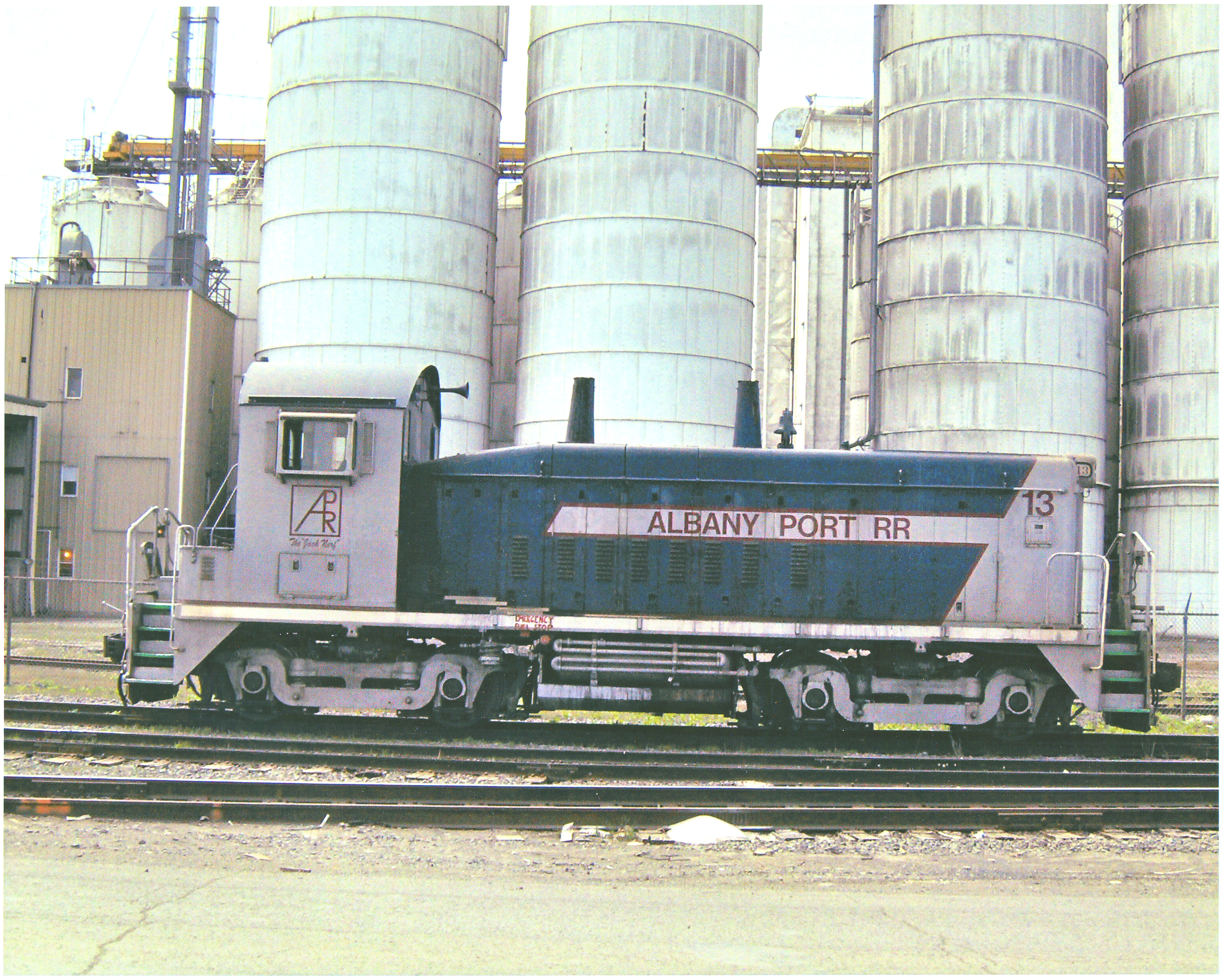
A switch Engine SW-9 train of the APRR stands in front of the Cargill Silos at the Port of Albany–Rensselaer.

The Albany Port Railroad (APRR), owned jointly by CSX and Canadian Pacific Railway (CP Rail), has 18 miles (29 km) of track inside the port. The APRR ties into CP Rail's Colonie Mainline and CSX's Port Subdivision for rail traffic out of the port. Norfolk Southern has an intermodal yard at the port. CP Rail's Kenwood Yard is adjacent to the port. The North Albany–Erie Street Yard, also owned by CP Rail, is a few miles north of the port and still in the city of Albany. CSX owns two nearby yards: the Selkirk Yard is eight miles (13 km) south of the port, and the West Albany Yard is four miles (6.4 km) north.

=== Truck ===
Major Interstates in proximity are:

- New York State Thruway, a toll-road (west from Albany it is Interstate 90 to Buffalo and beyond; south the Thruway is Interstate 87 to the New York Metro Area);
- I-787 connects Albany to Troy, New York;
- I-87 (south of Albany it is the Thruway, to the north the Adirondack Northway then at the Canada–US border it becomes Autoroute 15 to Montreal);
- I-90 (west of Albany it is the Thruway, to the east toll-free until rejoining the Thruway on its Berkshire Spur and continuing to Boston as the Mass Turnpike);
- I-88 connects Albany to Binghamton, New York.

=== Water-to-water ===
The Port of Albany is just south of where the New York State Canal System begins at the Federal Dam in Troy. The Erie Canal allows for water navigation to the Great Lakes, and the Champlain Canal connects the Hudson River to Lake Champlain. The Richelieu River/Chambly Canal then connects Lake Champlain to the St. Lawrence Seaway and Montreal.

== Facilities ==
The Port of Albany includes:

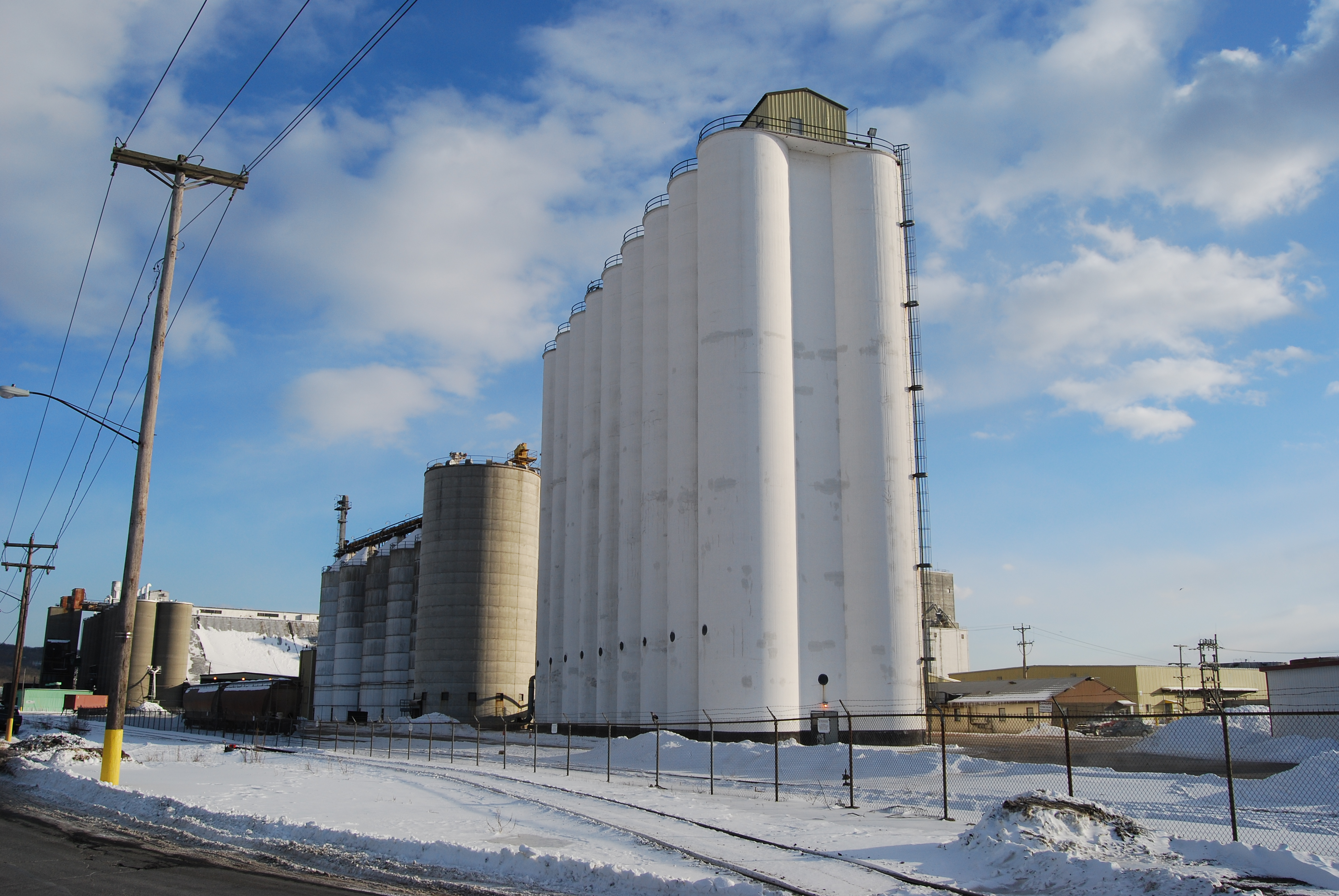
Cargill grain elevator

- Deep water facilities located on both banks of the river;
- two wharves: wharf length on the Albany side of the river is 4,200 feet (1,300 m) with four berths, and on the Rensselaer side the length is 1,100 feet (340 m) with one berth;
- 20-acre (8.1 ha) open storage yard;
- Customs and U.S. Department of Agriculture offices;
- Four transit sheds and two backup warehouses totaling 300,000 square feet (28,000 m^{2}) of storage;
- 13,500,000 US bushels (480,000,000 L; 108,000,000 US dry gal; 105,000,000 imp gal) capacity grain elevator;
- 18-million-US-gallon (68,000 m^{3}) capacity bulk liquid storage between two terminals;
- Heavy lift on-dock rail capability;
- Super-sacking and debagging operation;
- 12-acre (4.9 ha) road salt depot;
- 12-acre (4.9 ha) scrap yard;
- a 225-short-ton (201-long-ton; 204-metric-ton) capacity crane and a mobile harbor crane, which is the largest harbor crane in the state of New York.

=== Maritime services ===
Stevedoring operations at the Port of Albany are managed by Federal Marine Terminals, Inc. and Port Albany Ventures, LLC. The Hudson River Pilots Association handles pilotage on the Hudson River.

=== Tenants ===
The rent from the 32 businesses at the port in 2008 contributes $2.76 million in revenue for the port. As of 2015 there are 23 businesses in 21 buildings occupying 97% of the space available at the port. Tenants include Ardent Mills, Buckeye Partners, Callanan Industries, Cargill (the oldest tenant at the port), Cargill Nutrena, CCI Rensselaer, Durham School Services, Federal Marine Terminals, Gorman Brothers, Mohawk Paper, Newcastle Construction, NYS Department of Environmental Conservation, Normal Truck and Trailer, Rensselaer Iron and Steel, San Greco Construction, Upstate Shredding, Waste Management, Inc. of New York, Westway Feed Products, and W.M. Biers.

== Cargo ==
Some commodities come through the port on a regular basis, others are special cargo for a limited time. Such limited time cargo includes subway cars shipped to Albany from Brazil in 2006 for six months and most recently subway cars from China bound for Springfield and Boston's MBTA, and 30-inch (760 mm) diameter pipes with associated materials from Italy first shipped in May 2007. The pipes were for a 186-mile (299 km) long natural gas pipeline and included 60,000 short tons (53,571 long tons; 54,431 t) of material in about a dozen ships. In 2015 69 ships and barges called at the port, a 15% increase over 2010. Commodities shipped to or from Albany on a regular basis include:

- Animal feed;
- Cement;
- Cocoa beans;
- Grain (including corn and wheat);
- Gypsum;
- Ethanol;
- Heavy lift items (including turbines, generators, heat exchangers, and rotors);
- Liquid fertilizer;
- Millscale and scrap metal;
- Molasses;
- Petroleum distillates (including diesel, gasoline, heating oil, and kerosene);
- Salt;
- Steel;
- Sugar;
- Wood pulp and logs.

== Tourism ==
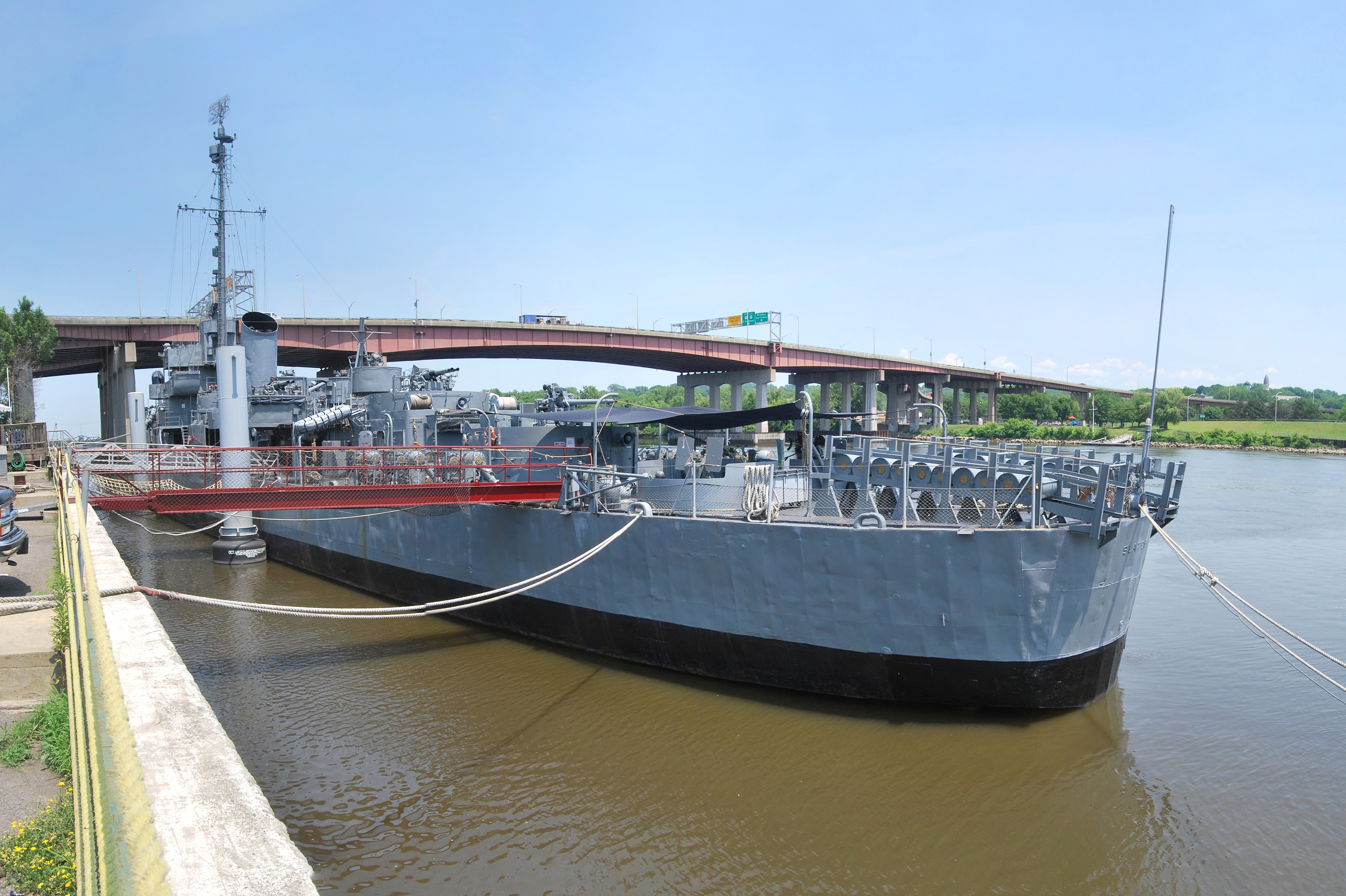
Stern quarter view of USS Slater

Along with commercial activities the Port of Albany has non-industrial uses along the river. A ship museum and a tourism cruise ship are docked at the Steamboat Square. Steamboat Square was, until 2010, named the Snow Dock for being where city trucks dumped into the Hudson River snow plowed from the streets. A PortFest was held in 2007 to commemorate the 75th anniversary of the Port of Albany-Rennselaer and the 10th anniversary of USS Slater as a museum ship docked at Albany. National Maritime Day is celebrated with free trolley rides of the port and free rides aboard the Dutch Apple Cruise.

USS Slater, which is the only destroyer escort still afloat in the United States, sits at Steamboat Square near the foot of Madison Avenue. The ship is open from April to November to the public. The destroyer closes to the public from December to March and moves from the Steamboat Square to the port's Rensselaer side. In August 2008 part of the Japanese film Orion in Midsummer (scheduled for release in spring 2009) was filmed on board.

Dutch Apple Cruises, a private company which gives day cruises on the Hudson River and Erie Canal, also operates at the Steamboat Square. The city of Albany has a public boat launch and boat house along the Hudson in the Corning Preserve. The boat house and launch are used by the Albany Rowing Center, a non-profit rowing organization. On the Rensselaer side of the Hudson is the Albany Yacht Club. The club was founded in the city of Albany in 1873 and is one of the oldest yacht clubs in the nation. In 1954 the club moved to the Rensselaer side and since 1971 has been at its current location just south of the Dunn Memorial Bridge. Facilities are open to the public at large and not just to members.

== See also ==
- Albany Convention Center
- Capital District
- Capital District Transportation Authority
- History of Albany, New York
- Hudson River–Black River Regulating District
- List of North American ports
- List of ports in the United States
- New York State Archives
- Ogdensburg Bridge and Port Authority
- Port Authority of New York and New Jersey
- Port of Oswego
- The Egg
