= New York State Archives =

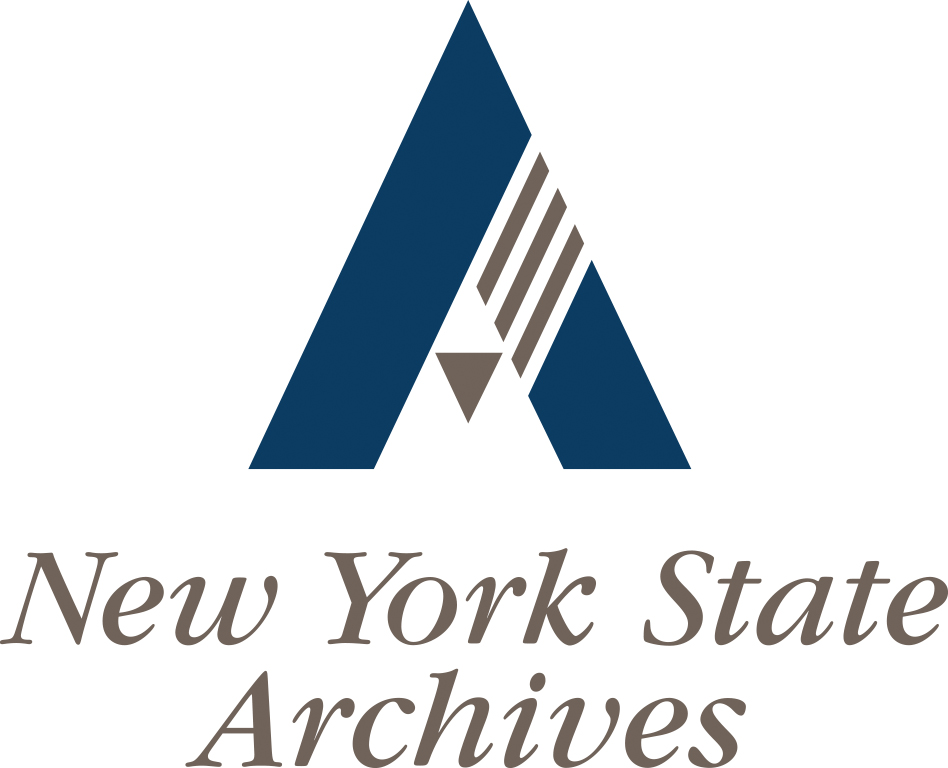
Logo of the New York State Archives

The New York State Archives is a unit of the Office of Cultural Education within the New York State Education Department, with its main facility located in the Cultural Education Center on Madison Avenue in Albany, New York, United States. The New York State Library and the New York State Museum are also located in the Cultural Education Center.

== Organization ==
The New York State Archives was established in 1971 to preserve and make accessible recorded evidence documenting New York State's history, governments, events, and peoples from the 17th century to the present. Full operations began in 1978 when the organization's storage and research facility opened in the Cultural Education Center.

== Collections ==
The Archives preserves and provides access to over 270 million documents dating from the period of Dutch and British colonial rule during the 17th and 18th centuries through the modern day. The State Archives preserves records from the legislative, judicial, and executive branches of state government. Topics covered in those records include relations with Native Americans, the Erie Canal and westward expansion, industrial development, labor, the rise of the modern social welfare system, public education, public health, the environmental movement, and New York State citizens' participation in numerous military conflicts. The collection includes nearly 13,000 documents relating to the administration of the colony of New Netherland. In addition, the archives maintains the records of the construction of the Erie Canal and New York State Barge Canal including maps, engineering drawings and glass plate negatives. Finally, the collection includes over 50,000 motion picture film scripts from the 1920s to the 1960s. There is an online, searchable index to the film scripts available through the Archives' web site. The Archives' web site provides online access to over 100,000 digital images of maps, photographs and other materials of interest as well as an on-line catalog and online finding aids with descriptions of all records in the collection.

== Statewide programs ==
In 1987 the New York State Archives assumed the responsibility for overseeing management and disposition of state government records, including operation of the State Records Center in Albany. Legislation in 1988 created the Documentary Heritage Program that provides technical advisory services and competitive grants to historical societies, museums, libraries, and other nonprofit organizations holding historical records. Technical advisory services and training are now provided, free of charge, through the Archives' Documentary Heritage and Preservation Services for New York (DHPSNY) program. A local government records law in 1987 required the appointment of records management officers in 4300 local governments, including every county, city, town, village, and school and special district. A Local Government Records Management Improvement Fund was established in 1989 to support technical advisory services and competitive grants to local governments to help them develop and maintain records management programs. Through this program the State Archives provides archives and records management advice and technical support to every area of the State. Over $250 million in grant funds have been distributed since the program's inception.

The New York State Archives serves students and teachers, scholars and community researchers, government officials, the legal and business community, and the general public. It encourages students through awards, grants, and internships; helps teachers use historical documents as primary source material in the classroom; and offers stipends for research using State Archives’ records. The annual Student Research Award provides a cash award to New York State students in grades 3-5, 6-8 and 9-12 for projects that use historical records. The Archives maintains an online resource for teachers to support use of primary sources in the classroom. The Consider the Source online system contains thousands of images of primary sources as well as curriculum support resources developed by teachers. The Hackman Research Residency program provides travel grants to scholars to come to Albany to use the resources of the State Archives to conduct research and develop new knowledge using primary source materials. The nonprofit New York State Archives Partnership Trust, established in 1992, provides support for preservation of and access to the treasures of the State Archives, educational projects that make historical records available to teachers and students and programs that promote New York State’s archives and history and publishes a quarterly magazine New York Archives with articles and photographic essays on New York state history.

== New York State Archives Partnership Trust ==
The New York State Archives Partnership Trust is a New York State public-benefit corporation located within the Cultural Education Center whose mission is to create an endowment to preserve archival records. The Archives Partnership Trust is governed by a board of trustees and supports a wide variety of preservation, education and outreach programs in support of the work of the State Archives. It is not listed within the 2018 New York State Authorities Budget Office report.

== See also ==
- Albany Convention Center
- Capital District Transportation Authority
- The Egg, Albany
- Port of Albany-Rensselaer
