= Port of Oswego =

Coordinates: 43°27′50″N 76°30′37″W

The Port of Oswego is the main waterfront area of the City of Oswego in Oswego County, New York. Over the course of its history, the Port of Oswego has been the focus of military conflict and conquest, a site of record trade revenue, and a significant part in the History of American expansion and industrialism. Today the Port of Oswego is a shadow of its once-powerful self but still proves to be useful as trade continues in the central New York region.

Early explorers in the 17th century of Dutch, French, and English origin realized the value of an all-water route connecting the French settlements along the St. Lawrence River with the Dutch settlement of New Amsterdam. This would create a trade route that would stretch well over 500 miles (800 km) and give the controller of this route a significant advantage for turning profits in the New World. The Port of Oswego would become the focal point of this perceived route and bring the country that owns it almost infinite resources for constructing an empire in the New World.

The history of activity at the Port can be divided into four great periods of development: The Fur Trading Era, The Salt Era, The Lumber and Grain Era, and The Coal Era.

== Governance ==
The Port of Oswego Authority is a New York State public-benefit corporation that operates the port facilities and regulates development in the Oswego Port District. William Scriber acts as its Acting Executive Director and reports to a 6-member board of directors. In 2016, the authority had operating expenses of $4.84 million, an outstanding debt of $1.05 million, and a level of staffing of 117 people.

Currently, as of April 1, 2026, the new director is Tom Drumm. Operating a staff of around 100 to 200 people, between part time, full time and temporary workers.

== History ==
=== Fur Trading Era (1610-1796) ===
The era of the fur trade saw the Port of Oswego change hands four different times. The port was controlled at the beginning of the era by the Dutch from 1610 until 1650, although there is a very minimal record as to what activity was taking place at the port while under Dutch control. The second major power to control the port during The Fur Trade Era was the French, who held control of the port from 1650 to 1700. The British were the next to have the Port of Oswego under their control, as they controlled it from 1700 until 1775. The port wasn't handed over to the United States until 1796 and since then has been under the jurisdiction of the United States.

Throughout the beginning of The Fur Trading Era the port was split between the French, the Iroquois (the Native American society indigenous to central New York), and the English. During the early 18th century the French were under the impression that the English would be able to penetrate westward into the North American continent by way of Oswego and threaten the main stream of the French fur trade in the Northeast. The Iroquois, whose home was Oswego, wanted to maintain possession of it for obvious reasons. The English recognized Oswego as a key position in waterway traffic which they must possess if they hoped to dominate the growing Western fur trade market as well as try and convert the local Iroquois to the cause of the English Crown.

The fur trade at Oswego subsequently boomed mainly due to the items exchanged at its port. The fur trade being conducted at the Port of Oswego during The Fur Trade Era was primarily an exchange of beaver pelts for rum. When the Native American groups from the west got word that a fully loaded canoe would bring twice the amount of "fire water" at Oswego than other ports like the one at Niagara, they quickly ditched their French beneficiaries and flooded the port at Oswego with canoe after canoe of pelts. It wasn't long before the average annual revenue of the 18th century port reached $100,000.

During the Seven Years' War (1756-1763), The French objective was to destroy the English dockyards at Oswego, as well as the partially completed forts guarding the port at the time. It was around this same time that contract labor was used to build the first naval vessel ever built by the English in a fresh water port. The boat, named Oswego, was sunk in the harbor by attacking French forces during the early months of The Seven Years' War in 1755. Later in the war, the docks were rebuilt by the English and used primarily for launching campaigns on French forces at Fort Frontenac and Montreal. The peace treaty that brought The Seven Years' War to an end changed the status of Oswego as a Port. With the English's acquisition of Canada, fur trading in Oswego was practically non-existent. The surrounding ports of Niagara, Toronto, and Montreal eclipsed Oswego as dominant ports on the great lakes.

During the years following the American Revolution, the British maintained possession of The Port of Oswego and saw an estimated 7,000 loyalists pass through it on their way to British held Canada. At this time, no American vessels were allowed to pass through the port if they carried any cargo that was produced in the United States other than grain, flour, cattle or provisions. On top of this, all American traders were stopped at the port and their goods were confiscated.

By the time the British handed the city and the port at Oswego over to the Americans on July 14, 1796, The Fur Trading Era was long over. However, a growing salt industry out of the Onondaga River area to the south would come to benefit the Port of Oswego.

=== The Salt Era (1796-1873) ===
As the tide of civilization moved westward and the ever-changing frontiers were pushed back by the swelling throng of immigrants, so also did New York's first great industry expand. In the first few years of the 19th Century, over 600,000 bushels of salt passed through Oswego alone. In 1799 Oswego was made headquarters of its district and became the first port of entry in the United States west of the Atlantic Seaboard. Around this time an average of 150 complete trips per year were made between Oswego and Niagara by vessels weighing 40 to 100 tons. Also at this time, the first commercial sailing built at Oswego was a schooner of 90 tons named the Fair American. It was launched in 1804 and sold to the United States Government for use during the War of 1812. Between the period of 1807 and 1817, 23 known sailing vessels were built in Oswego Harbor. In 1810, 31 out of 60 sailing ships trading on Lake Ontario were registered in Oswego.

Under the Jefferson Embargo Act of 1807, the Port of Oswego saw its first hurdle as an American port. Oswego, a main shipping center for salt, potash, and general merchandise to Canada was so affected by the Act that in 1808, local opposition had almost reached the level of armed insurrection.

Just prior to the War of 1812, the United States government designated Oswego as its official naval base on Lake Ontario. This meant that naval supplies were stored at the Port of Oswego and transferred onto ships to be delivered north to Sackets Harbor. This made Oswego a prime target for the British during the War of 1812 and it was eventually destroyed in the Battle of Fort Oswego of 1814.

The construction of the Erie Canal diverted trade away from Oswego and brought it to Buffalo instead. The Oswego Canal Corporation sought to improve the waterway from Oswego to Onondaga Lake to counter this. Within a few years, New York State was persuaded to take over the work begun by the Oswego Canal Corporation and on April 28, 1829 the Oswego Canal was completed. On August 4, 1830 the first vessel cleared from Cleveland to Oswego with the construction of the Welland Canal.

The combination of the Oswego Canal and the Welland Canal proved to be just as effective as the Erie Canal. From 1830 to 1836 the number of vessels arriving at Oswego rose annually from 546 to 2,004. And the tonnage coming through the port increased from 521 in 1830 to 21,079 in 1848. Also, the total value of the lake trading business at Oswego in 1830 was $277,000 but due to the canals' effect on Oswego, by 1848 revenues had exploded to almost $20 million.

However, discovery of new salt deposits in Canada, Michigan, and West Virginia, together with changes in salt manufacturing techniques, crippled business for the Port of Oswego.

=== The Lumber and Grain Era (~1840-1928) ===
Lumber had always been a key export for England during the colonial era but the importation of lumber was always more valuable. There was tremendous growth in the importation of lumber at the Port of Oswego from 1840-1870:

- 1840: 19,560,497 board feet
- 1850: 67,586,985 board feet
- 1860: 190,402,228 board feet
- 1870: 284,539,533 board feet

It was during this period of great growth that the grain trade was born. Western prairies shipped grains into Oswego and trade reached its peak in 1856 when 18,646,955 bushels were received at Oswego. Flour milling expanded as well for manufactured shipments east for consumption and exportation. In the 1850s Oswego ranked with Baltimore, Rochester, and St. Louis as the most important flouring centers in the United States. In 1860, the largest flouring mill in the country was built in Oswego and shipped an average of 300,000 barrels of flour per year through the Port of Oswego.

In 1855, the Canadian–American Reciprocity Treaty allowed the Port of Oswego to achieve milestone such as the greatest tonnage ever moved on Oswego Canal, greatest quantity of salt exported, greatest quantity of grain imported, and the greatest quantity of grain transported down the Oswego Canal.

Beginning in 1870, the Port of Oswego saw a gradual decline in business over the course of a 60-year period. By the late 19th century, only the coal business remained active at the port. The railroad business that had ruined Oswego's port was in large part responsible for its continued increase in exportation of coal and kept the port active through its years of decline.

=== The Coal Era (Late 19th century-early 20th century) ===
Coal remained the one business that showed consistent improvement for the Port of Oswego. However, by becoming chiefly an export port rather than an import port, the balance of trade revenue was disrupted:

- 1870 coal exports: $1,112,352 revenue
- Early 1930s coal exports: $1,000 revenue
- 1870 coal imports: 54,526 tons
- 1941 coal imports: 1 million tons

In 1913, the Port of Oswego had reached its last years of dominance as it was demoted under the Reorganization Act from its own Customs District to a port of entry in the Rochester District. From this point on, the once-powerful port was at the mercy of western rival ports.

=== Former Decline ===
The port declined due to the growth of more advantageous water routes such as the St. Lawrence River, along with the failure of the Federal Government to complete improvements on the Great Lakes.

The increased traffic on Welland Canal due to cheaper rates led to lifting of tolls on Erie Canal which terminated trade on Welland Canal and subsequently Oswego. This was accompanied by an improved canal system on St. Lawrence River.

More fundamentally, railroads destroyed the advantages that the Port of Oswego had formerly enjoyed as a transshipment point for water before faster methods of land transportation, and larger steam ships became too much for a small port like Oswego to handle.

=== Current status and Uplifting ===
Nearly 120 vessels call on an annual basis and the port moves in excess of one million tons each year. Products handled at the port include windmill components, fertilizer, cement, corn, soybeans, wheat, salt, nuclear power components, aluminum and petroleum products such as liquid asphalt and heating fuel. Fifteen companies currently call the Port of Oswego home for a portion of their domestic or international shipping operations.

Future ideas and expansions are in progress for the port. Expansion of the railyard is in development stages. Possible expansions and dredging of the river, harbor and inlet to the port would accommodate for larger cargo vessels to come through, with the possibility of cargo containers being brought into the port.

The Port of Oswego’s strategic location at the crossroads of the Northeastern North American shipping market, puts them less than 350 miles from 60 million people.

- The port recently opened the new, $2.1 million Goble Marina for recreational boaters adjacent to the Port’s West Pier. In addition, $40,000 was invested in the Port Authority Marina to replace 12 deteriorating docks and create 24 new slips. This marina is also home to 24 charter fishing captains which generate more than $2 million in annual economic impact.
- In 2023, The Port moved over 11,000 tons of specialty freight. These included components for a new Lithium battery recycling facility in Rochester, a Novelis production line update, and a transformer for a nuclear power plant.
- In 2023, the Port became the only Foreign Trade Zone (FTZ) in Oswego County, which allows companies to save money on duties, tariffs and production costs.
- The Port is undergoing a $5 million rail yard expansion, which includes the purchase of an all-electric rail engine, major upgrades to rail service at the Fitzgibbons Intermodal Terminal, and construction of a fifth storage track. This will make the port the largest operating yard in Oswego County when completed.

== See also ==
- Ogdensburg Bridge and Port Authority
- Port Authority of New York and New Jersey
- Port of Albany-Rensselaer
