= Albany Port Railroad =

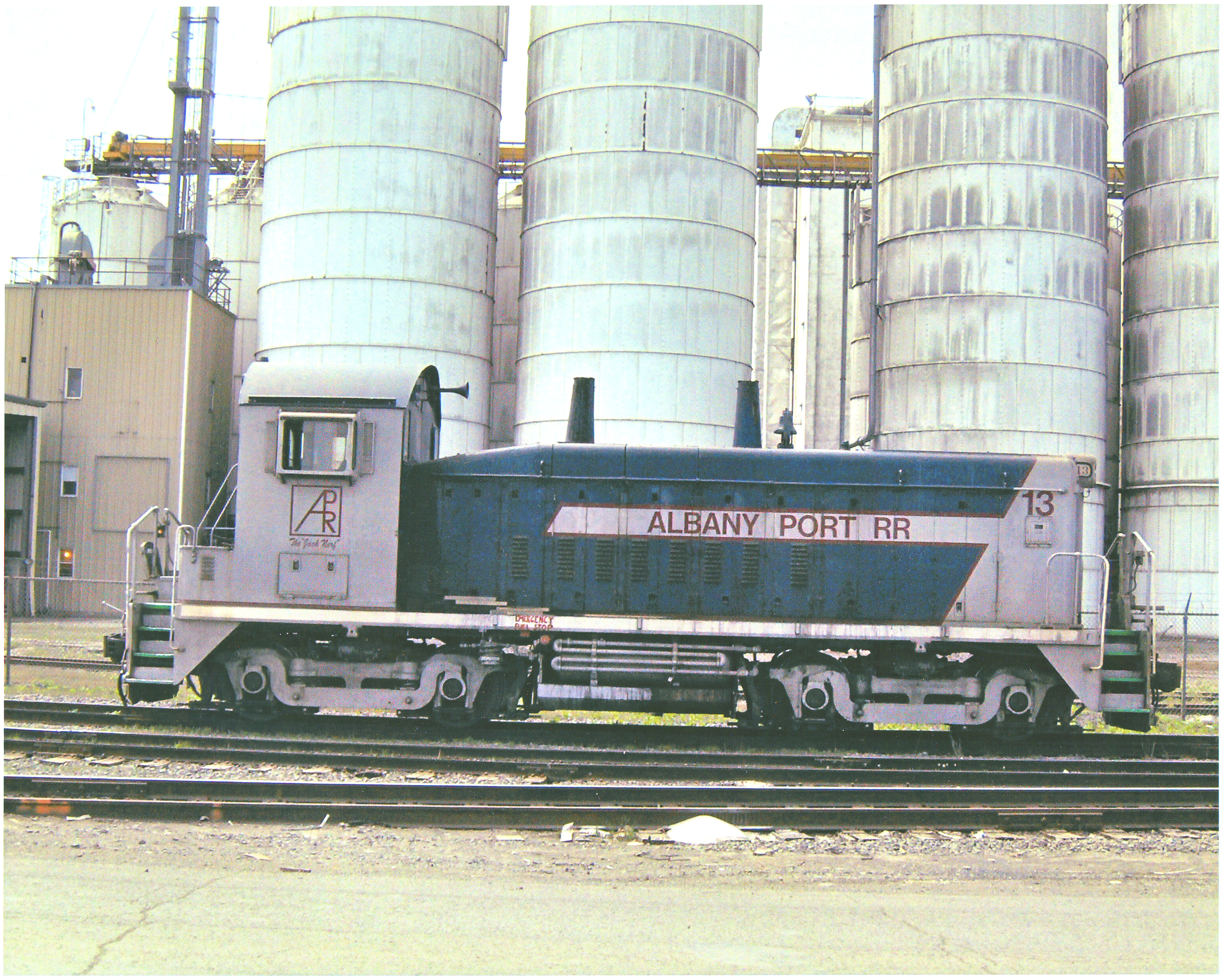
- An EMD SW9 switcher stands in front of the Cargill Silos at the Port of Albany-Rensselaer.

Overview
- Headquarters: Albany, New York
- Reporting mark: APD
- Locale: Albany, New York

Technical
- Track gauge: 4 ft 8 1/2 in (1,435 mm) standard gauge

The Albany Port Railroad (reporting mark APD) operates industrial trackage at the Port of Albany-Rensselaer located to the south of downtown Albany, NY along the Hudson River. Customers include a large Cargill grain facility. The operation is jointly owned by CSX and Canadian Pacific Railway.
