= The Egg, Albany =

Performing arts center in Albany, New York

The Egg
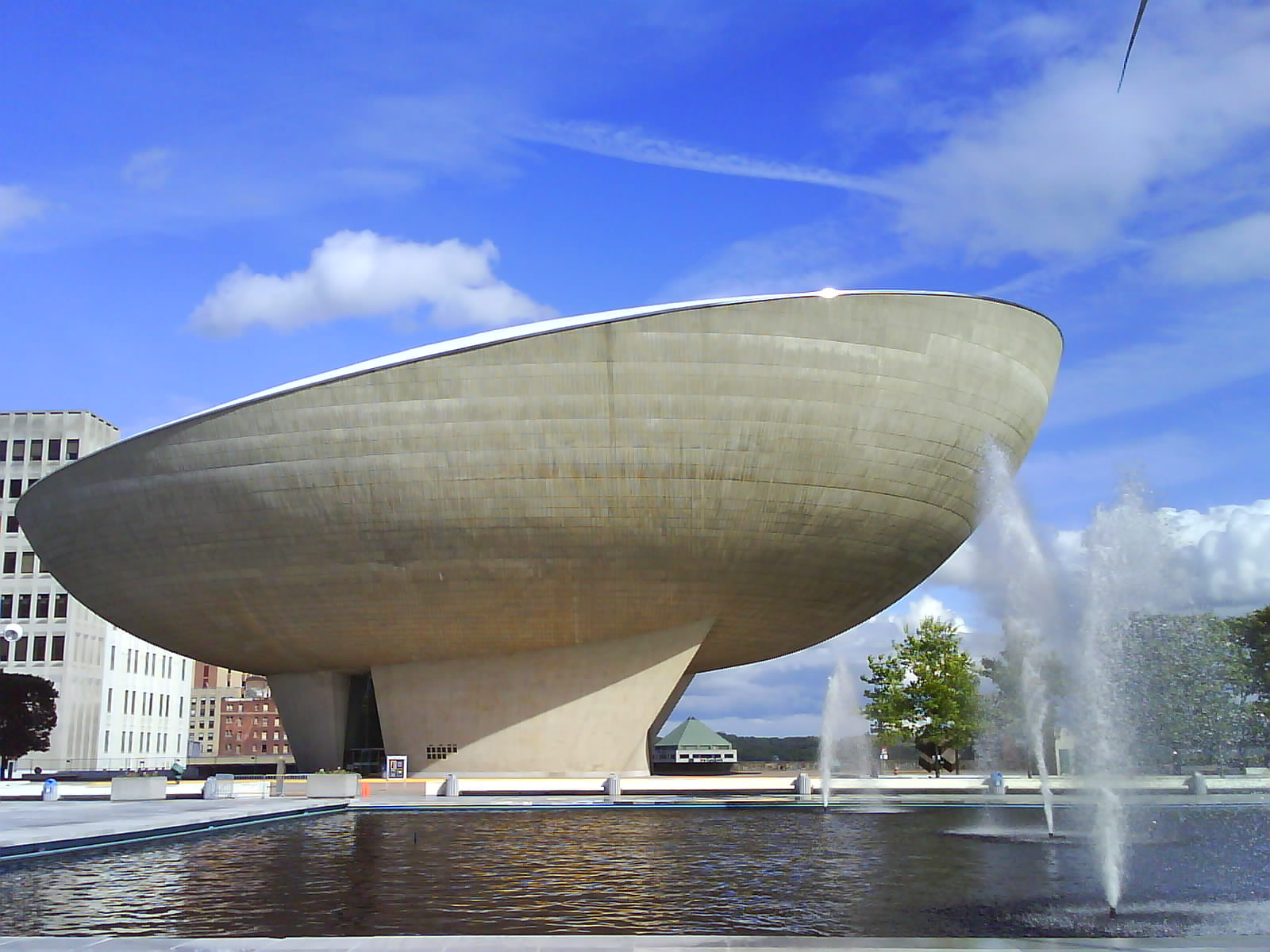
- Interactive map of The Egg
- Address: Empire State Plaza
- Location: Albany, NY 12220; USA
- Coordinates: 42.6505°N 73.7584°W
- Owner: Empire State Plaza
- Capacity: Lewis A. Swyer Theatre: 450; Kitty Carlisle Hart Theatre: 982
- Type: Performing arts center

Construction
- Opened: 1978

Website
- www.theegg.org

The Egg is a performing arts venue in Albany, New York. Named for its shape, the building was designed by Harrison & Abramovitz as part of the Empire State Plaza project, and built between 1966 and 1978. It is located in the northeast corner of the Plaza. It has become an icon of New York's Capital District due to its unusual shape and central location. The Egg is owned by the state of New York and managed by the Nelson A. Rockefeller Empire State Plaza Performing Arts Center Corporation a not-for-profit that was created in 1979 to manage the performing arts facility in the Empire State Plaza.

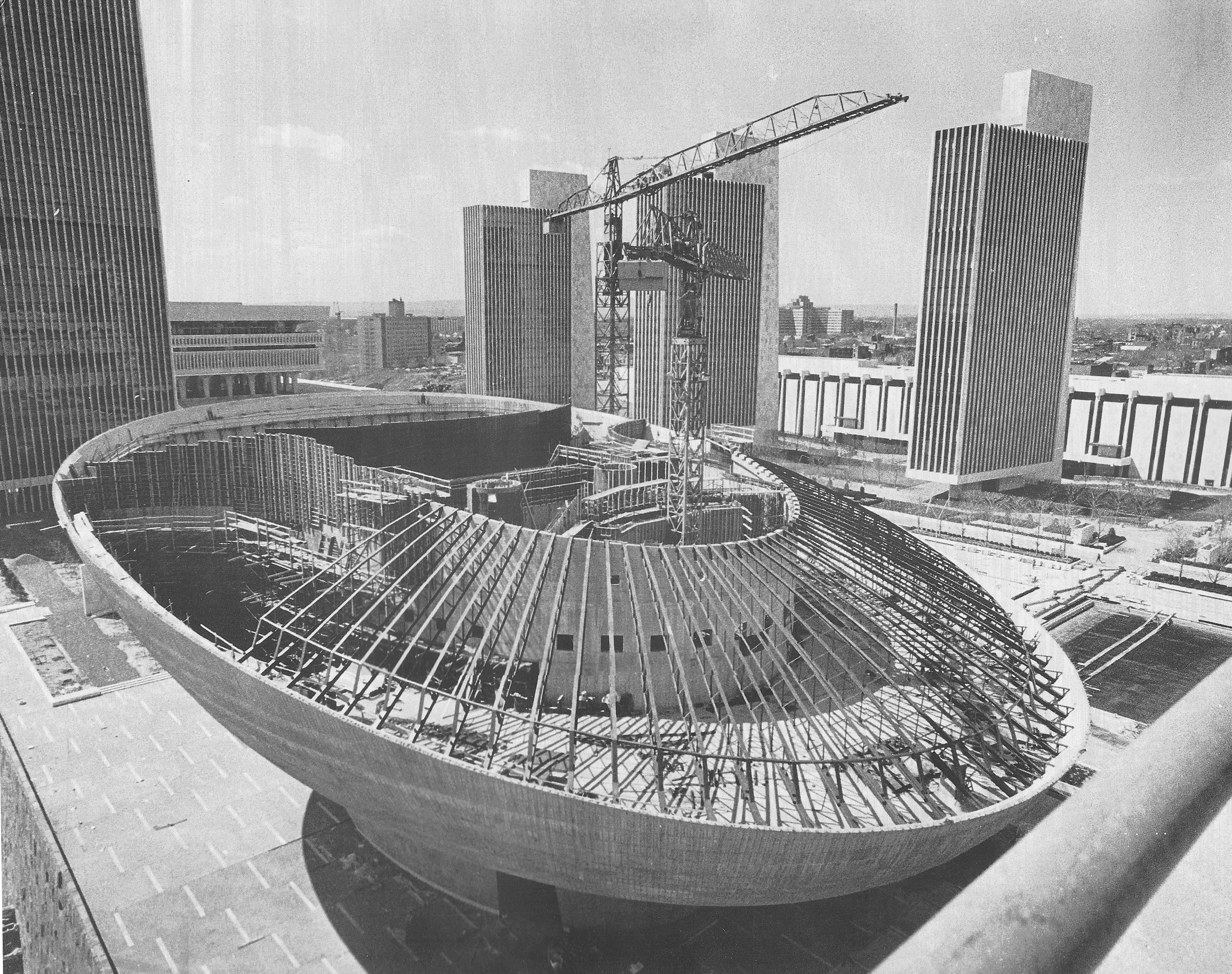
Under construction

== Organization ==
The Nelson A. Rockefeller Empire State Plaza Performing Arts Center Corporation is governed by an 11-member board of directors. The board is chosen by the New York State Governor, the New York State Senate, the New York State Assembly, the Albany County Executive, and also has a member from the New York State Office of General Services.

Construction of the facility was managed by the New York State Office of General Services (OGS). Upon completion, OGS assumed management of the facility operations as well, contracting with Porter Van Zandt, a Broadway director and former executive of The Acting Company to advise the agency.

A public benefit corporation was created by an act of the legislature in 1979. The move was initially opposed by then-mayor Erastus Corning II, who feared he would have less control over it, though appointed representatives ensured that he remained involved. The first executive of the corporation was Mark Tilley. After two tumultuous years, he was replaced by Patricia Snyder, founder and executive of the Empire State Youth Theatre Institute. Tasked with revamping programs and operations, she worked closely with noted composer Joe Raposo, who as Vice Chair of the board of directors, headed the programming task force.

Under Synder's leadership, the facility was governed by a union of three organizations—the Egg's own purpose-built corporation, Snyder's youth theatre program, and the SUNY administration, a structure that was called "an administrative nightmare" by the Albany Times Union. Snyder oversaw a flourishing of youth theatre productions, to the detriment of a broader slate of programming. Her management style was criticized as opaque and combative.

A 1987 report recommended dissolving the three-way structure to diversify the facility's programming, creating conflict between Snyder and several board members. The report criticized the organizational structure and Snyder's practices. The factions feuded for a year. In 1988, a proposal brokered by local arts patron Lewis Swyer allowed the youth theatre program to continue at the Egg, while also expanding presentations.

The three-way corporate entity formally split, with Snyder stepping down as executive of the Egg but remaining in charge of her theatre programs. The youth theatre company remained in residence at the facility, albeit with a reduced amount of usage amidst its own financial challenges, but new executive director Terry Lorden was hired to oversee the broader portfolio of activities. The three organizations fought over the division of assets.

In 2017, the corporation had operating expenses of $1.96 million and a staffing level of 43 people.

== Structure ==
The structure was built over the course of 12 years, and was the final facility completed as part of the Empire State Plaza. Originally slated to take two years to build, the numerous arcs and complicated design features required uniquely delicate surveying and careful implementation, causing the project to take longer. It debuted to the public on Memorial Day in May 1978. Construction supervisor John Byron noted that the spherical shape was designed to bring people closer together, in contrast to traditional proscenium theaters that are generally square in orientation.

The Egg is slightly inclined, and has a small pedestal on which it appears to sit. In fact, the building is held by a stem that goes down six stories into the Plaza. Attached to this stem is a concrete girdle that surrounds The Egg, enabling it to retain its shape and transmitting its weight to the pedestal. The building's organic shape reflects Nelson Rockefeller's original goal of architectural design that uses the fine artistic elements of sculpture.

The Egg houses two theaters, the 450-seat Lewis A. Swyer Theatre and the 982-seat Kitty Carlisle Hart Theatre.

== Programming ==
In April 1978, the Empire State Youth Theatre Institute became the first resident company. Two years later, The Egg launched its first slate of full cultural programming, with a 10-month season of theatre, dance and other performing arts presentations.

In March 1980, Capital Repertory Theatre debuted at The Egg, with a production of George M. Cohan's The Tavern, starring Court Miller, Sofia Landon Geier, Patricia Charbonneau and Steve Hytner.

Since 1990, the Ellen Sinopoli Dance Company, a modern dance performing arts group, has been a resident company. The Egg is also the summer home of the Ajkun Ballet Theatre, a New York City based professional company, since 2000.

The venue draws many performing acts to Albany, including music, dance, and traditional stage presentations.

== In popular culture ==
- The Egg is the subject of a song by They Might Be Giants, entitled "Albany", which was written for a performance there and later included on their 2004 Venue Songs compilation album.
- In 2013, Mike Gordon of Phish released a live album titled The Egg. The album was recorded live on December 11, 2011 at The Egg.
- The Egg is the setting for indie rock singer-songwriter Mitski's 2021 music video for the single "Working for the Knife".
- Notable artists who have performed at The Egg include: Roger McGuinn, Gordon Lightfoot, Chaka Khan, Dave Chappelle, Eric Burdon, Bebel Gilberto, WAR, David Byrne, Boz Scaggs, King Crimson, Margaret Cho, Buddy Guy, Leon Russell, Marty Stuart, Brian Regan, the Mark Morris Dance Company, Guster, and New Riders of the Purple Sage.

== See also ==
- Albany Convention Center
- Capital District Transportation Authority
- New York State Archives
- Port of Albany-Rensselaer
