= Empire Zone =

An Empire Zone is an area of up to two non-contiguous miles, in which tax incentives are offered by the state of New York, under the Empire Zones Program.

== History ==
The New York State Legislature created the Economic Development Zone program in 1986 to specific areas of the state more attractive economically. It was revised and expanded in 2000 (easier to create new zones of development), and Economic Development Zones were renamed Empire Zones. In 2009, Empire State Development (ESD) reported 82 Empire Zones statewide where over 9,800 certified businesses employed over 380,000 people. However, the cost of the program also escalated from $30 million in 2000 to $582 million in 2008. It was criticized by the New York Citizens Budget Commission for being easily manipulated through fiscal montages for tax evasion purposes. A 2004 audit report by the State Comptroller concluded to a "poor financial management by the Zone Administration Boards". Another report showed that 70% of the companies receiving Empire Zone benefits failed to meet the job creations targets.

For Assemblyman Richard Brodsky of Westchester, the program was "corrupt and ought to be shut down."

The program was shut down in 2010, but its terms still applied for many businesses years after it stopped. Maintaining its engagement towards the previously certified businesses cost the state of New York an additional three to four billion dollars. According to Empire State Development's release:

Since its creation, the Program has gone through numerous revisions which have pulled the program away from its original focus on the State’s most distressed communities and in the process driven the costs of the program to unsustainable levels. That is why the Governor and legislature included in the 2009 – 2010 Executive Budget an early sunset to the Program, set to occur on June 30, 2010.

— Empire State Development

== Description ==
Qualifying businesses within these zones could apply for these incentives:

- Wage Tax Credit
- Zone Capital Credit
- New York State Sales Tax Refund
- Real Property Tax Credit
- Tax Reduction Credit
