= Albany Lumber District =

The lumber district of Albany, New York was relatively small in the 1830s with around six wholesale lumber merchants, but by the 1870s Albany was the largest lumber district in the United States by value, though by that time it had recently been outstripped in feet sold by Chicago. For about a quarter century in the middle of the 19th century the Albany lumber district was considered the largest white pine wholesale market. There were 3,963 sawmills operating in the lumber district in 1865 but by 1900 there were only around 150. A fire ripped through the district in 1908 signalling the decline of the lumber industry for Albany.

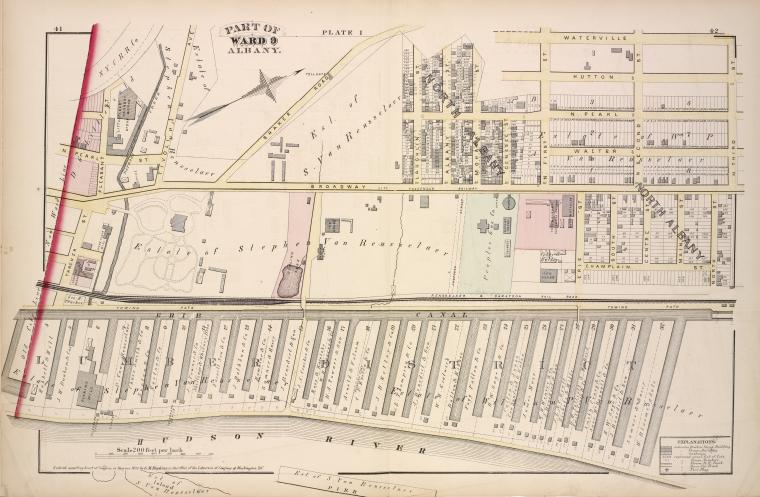
The lumber district and adjacent North Albany neighborhood.

The lumber district was considered to be the land from North Ferry Street north for about 1½ miles and from the Erie Canal on the west to the Hudson River on the east. It was about 500 feet (150 m) wide at the southern end and 1,150 feet (350 m) wide at the northern end and constituted over 100 acres (0.40 km^{2}). Thirty-one slips connected to the canal and ran east to within 150 feet (46 m) of the Hudson, the longest slip being 1,000 feet (300 m) long.

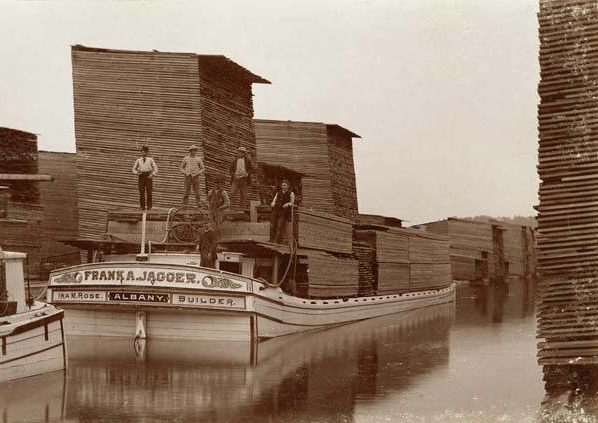
A boat loads up on lumber in the 1870s.

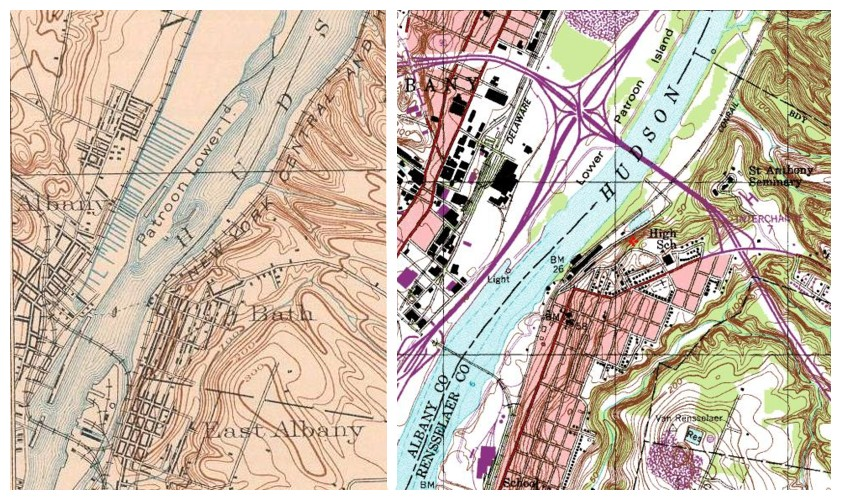
Erie Canal and lumber district slips before 1960 on left/I-787 and modern shoreline on right

When the Albany Basin was constructed in 1825 the pier separating the basin from the Hudson River was the quickly turned into a prestigious place for the lumber industry in Albany, which dates back to the arrival of a millwright and two sawyers in 1630 and the first sawmill in 1654. Until 1848 it continued to be considered the headquarters of the lumber trade in the city, even as the industry moved to the area between Quackenbush Street and the Columbia Street Bridge. The future lumber district at this time was owned by the Patroon Stephen Van Rensselaer and his brother William, and consisted of mostly vegetable gardens that paid little in the way of rent. The Patroon was approached about building slips off the canal for the use of the lumber industry in return for a more ample amount of rent. Originally the Patroon bore the cost of constructing the slips, but as time went on the lumber dealer took upon himself the cost of the slip in return for keeping the rent until such time as construction costs were paid for, at which time the dealer had to start paying rent to the Patroon as everyone else did. It took roughly eight years for the slip to be paid off. During the winter months when the slips were ice-bound and the offices closed, the lumber district virtually abandoned. The inspection system used in Albany for the white pine was the first inspection system for lumber and the model for many other systems.

At first the supplies of white pine were from within New York, in Allegany and Chemung counties. When those became over-harvested the supply shifted to southern Ontario, and after 1856 from Michigan where Albany buyers held the monopoly on the good white pine. The primary markets were the city of New York and New Jersey. The Albany market also had for a time foreign markets such as Argentina, Chile, and Australia.

The lumber district had its own dining saloon, telegraph office, a chapel, and several stores. For fire protection there were many fire hydrants and thousands of feet of fire hose. The lumber district did not have any track facilities connecting it to the railroads that fed into Albany until 1906 due to fears that the locomotives would spark a fire.

The eastern part of Arbor Hill around Ten Broeck Street became home to many of the wealthiest lumber merchants in Albany, where they proceeded to build grand rowhouses overlooking the lumber district, Erie Canal, and Hudson River.
