= Albany Convention Center =

Proposed convention center

- Artist rendition viewed from the current location of Liberty Street
- Interactive map of Albany Convention Center
- Address: Hudson Avenue and Broadway
- Location: Albany, New York
- Coordinates: 42°38′49.39″N 73°45′8.91″W
- Owner: Albany Convention Center Authority
- Operator: ASM Global

Construction
- Opened: N/A
- Cost: $220 million (projected)

Website
- http://www.accany.com/

The Albany Convention Center (ACC) was a proposed convention center to be located in downtown Albany, New York. The complex was initially proposed by Albany Mayor Gerald Jennings in 1994. In 2004, the Albany Convention Center Authority (ACCA) was established by the New York Legislature as a New York State public-benefit corporation to develop plans for the ACC. Supported by Governor George Pataki, the project was awarded a $75 million grant in 2006. The anticipated price tag of the project was approximately $220 million, and a site between Broadway, Hudson Avenue, and the South Mall Arterial was selected. In 2008, 2009, and 2010, the ACCA acquired much of the property that made up the proposed site.

In December 2013, Governor Andrew Cuomo approved plans for a different, smaller convention center to be built at the intersection of Howard and Eagle Streets. That convention center, which became known as the Albany Capital Center, was largely paid for using the state grant that had been set aside for the ACC; it opened on March 1, 2017. As of November 2016, there were no plans to develop the proposed site of the Albany Convention Center. In April 2018, the Albany Times Union reported that the ACCA wished to sell the proposed site of the Albany Convention Center for $1.

== History ==
=== Initial plans ===
The plan originated with Albany Mayor Gerald Jennings and various supporters in 1994, though progress was not actually made until 2002 when the mayor put out a "request for expressions of interest", with which the mayor requested possible locations for the convention center as well as preliminary designs and cost estimates. The complex was initially expected to cost between $140 and $160 million. The incentive for such a plan was based mainly on the lack of significant convention space in Albany and potential profits that could be generated from such a center in the state capital. Early plans suggested a 400-room hotel and up to 130,000 square feet (12,000 m^{2}) of convention space, large enough to accommodate 5,000 to 7,000 people.

Plans expanded quickly and by early 2003, estimates had reached $185 million with 250,000 square feet (23,000 m^{2}) and parking for up to 1,500 cars. By this time a Jennings-appointed convention center task force had yet to decide on a site. The top two locations were west of the Times Union Center between State and Beaver Streets and east of the Times Union Center in the area bounded by Broadway, Beaver Street, and Green Street.

=== Government support ===
In June 2004, with the support of Governor George Pataki, Assembly Speaker Sheldon Silver, and Senate Majority Leader Joseph Bruno, the New York Legislature established the Albany Convention Center Authority (ACCA), the public body entrusted with developing the convention center. The outcome was not that preferred by Jennings: his initial plan sought a development authority with greater power and the ability to finance up to $500 million with state backing. As created by the Legislature, the Authority was a group made of members to be appointed by a number of different state officials, with a finance limit of $185 million.

In 2005, Albany County's three-percent hotel tax was increased to five percent; a year later, it was increased to six percent. The additional tax was expected to raise $3 million annually in an effort to pay off the ACCA's $8.5 million estimated annual cost. (Note: Until construction on the project began, the revenues were to be split, with $1 million going toward administrative costs for the Albany Convention Center Authority and $2 million going directly toward the debt that Albany County owed for the Times Union Center (which the county owned).) Many local hotel owners and managers opposed the increased tax since the proceeds were funding a future competitor.

In early 2008, after a study by an architectural firm, the estimated cost was increased to almost $400 million. Jennings, the original proposer of the ACC, responded to this estimate by indicating the plan might no longer be viable. Members of the Authority, however, disagreed. At this time the plans were revised to include a 244,000-square-foot (22,700 m^{2}) convention center, a 400-room Sheraton Hotel and a raised parking garage with capacity for 1,100 cars. The project's major setback was lack of funding from the state, which was dealing with a $4.4 billion budget deficit. Many locals opposed the plan as wasteful spending; in contrast, a February 2008 Times Union editorial indicated its support saying, "This is a state project, not a city project and one entirely deserving of a commitment even larger than the $205 million that's been approved already."

With the state only approving about $200 million (including a $75 million grant from Governor Pataki), the ACCA made it clear in April 2008 that state tax money should pay for the difference ($190 million) in funding the project. In response, the new Paterson administration contracted with PricewaterhouseCoopers to review the viability of the project. By this point the project had spent only $2 million of the $75 million allotted by former Governor Pataki. The funding could only be spent on master planning. While waiting for approval from the State, the project was given permission to begin archaeological digs around the preferred site between Broadway, Hudson Avenue and the South Mall Arterial. Various relics from Albany's Dutch past were uncovered and catalogued for inclusion in future museum displays.

While ACCA board member (and Albany Assemblyman) Jack McEneny stated his belief that the ACC would eventually pay for itself through its revenue, the Empire Center for Public Policy described it as "a white elephant from the start. Here at a time where our borrowing is already excessive and our state budget is already overcommitted, you're talking about bailing out a project that was unnecessary to begin with." A study sponsored by the ACCA projected that the ACC would bring in 50 to 85 events annually, each lasting one to four days; 100,000 to 185,000 more annual visitors are expected to the city as a result.

In November 2009, the ACCA revealed its design for the ACC, developed by HNTB. The ACCA was able to reduce its earlier $400 million estimate by turning hotel and parking garage development over to private developers. This brought the cost estimate down to between $225 million and $240 million. After considering the cost of goods and commodities during the economic recession, the estimate dropped again to $220 million.

Because the project was not shovel-ready at the time, the ACC was not eligible for stimulus funds.

Amid large cuts proposed by Andrew Cuomo in his 2011 budget, the original funding for the ACC remained.

=== Procuring land ===
Land Acquisitions
Date	Size (acre)	Price	Seller	Ref.
31 Jul 2009	0.5	$469,673	Greyhound Lines	
28 Aug 2009	0.39	$435,000	Albany County	
24 Feb 2010	0.33	$550,000	Capitalize Albany Corp.	
20 Aug 2010	3.0	$5,900,000	City Square Associates	

A site between Broadway, Hudson Avenue, and the South Mall Arterial was selected as the location of the Albany Convention Center. As of 2010, the proposed site consisted mostly of surface-level parking lots.

In late 2008, $10 million (part of the original $75 million promised by Governor Pataki) was released by Governor Paterson to begin the acquisition of the land necessary for the project. The first piece of land, a 0.5-acre (0.20 ha) parking lot, was bought in July 2009 from Greyhound Lines at a cost of $469,673. In August 2009, the Albany County Legislature approved the sale of nine vacant county-owned lots—totaling 0.39 acres (0.16 ha)—to the ACCA at a cost of $453,000. In February 2010, the ACCA bought about 0.5 acres (0.20 ha) of land, which brought its total to about 1.5 acres (0.61 ha). In August 2010 it purchased about 3 acres (1.2 ha) of land at a cost of $5.9 million. After this sale, the ACCA had acquired about 75% of the land necessary for the project.

=== Proposed design ===
Bird's eye view of the proposed Albany Convention Center as of November 2009; Broadway is shown at bottom-left, Hudson Avenue is along right side.

The proposed design of the Albany Convention Center called for a brick and glass structure with an exhibition hall, two ballrooms and other various meeting spaces totaling about 300,000 square feet (28,000 m^{2}). In early 2008, it was announced that the site would include a 400-room Sheraton Hotel, to be run by Starwood Hotels and Resorts Worldwide Inc., of White Plains; a 300,000-square-foot (28,000 m^{2}) convention center, to be operated by SMG Management (the company that operates the Times Union Center), and an 1,100-car parking garage. A bridge would also connect the convention center to the Times Union Center. The back of the center would face the South Mall Arterial, and there would be loading docks on that side of the structure. A plaza near the center of the complex would face Broadway. The design allowed for future expansion of the convention space.

The Van Ostrande-Radliff House, which is believed to be the oldest building in the city of Albany, is located within the proposed footprint of the ACC. The house was built by Johannes van Ostrande around 1728 and is a rare example of Dutch architecture from its time. Owner Brian Parker reached an agreement with the ACCA that the building would be saved, possibly making use of it as a visitor center.

=== Controversy ===
There was significant opposition to the proposed Albany Convention Center. Some opponents argued that Albany did not need a new convention center at all, others suggested that the ACCA consider expanding current convention facilities, and still others proposed moving the project to the University Heights neighborhood, the College of Nanoscale Science and Engineering campus, or the Harriman State Office Campus. Some opponents suggested that the ACC funds be to buy up vacant buildings and renovate them as a stimulus for the downtown economy instead of being used for a convention center. Opponents also questioned the cost of the project and the availability of construction workers in the Albany area.

=== Albany Capital Center ===
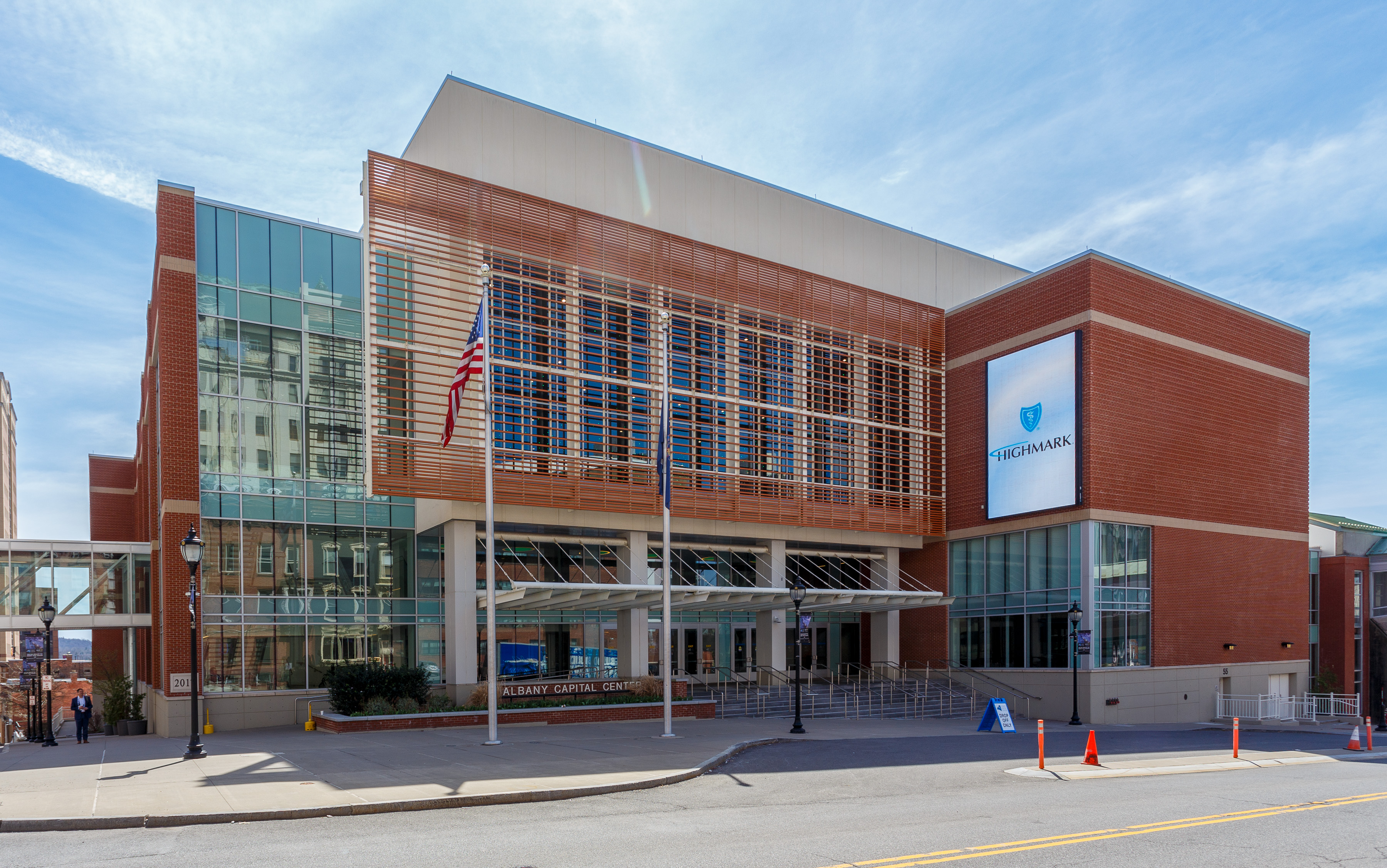
Albany Capital Center

In December 2013, Governor Andrew Cuomo approved plans for a different, smaller convention center to be built at the intersection of Howard and Eagle Streets. That convention center became known as the Albany Capital Center. The Albany Capital Center, which cost $78 million and was largely paid for using the $75 million state grant that had been set aside for the ACC, opened on March 1, 2017. The Albany Capital Center is a meeting, ballroom, and exhibit venue. It can accommodate up to 5,000 people, with 22,500 square feet of exhibit space, six meeting rooms with 9,200 square feet of space, and 13,500 square feet of pre-function space.

=== Abandonment of project and later developments ===
As of November 2016, there were no plans to develop the proposed site of the Albany Convention Center; the ACCA had reportedly "spent $8 million for the properties, and another $3.8 million on site costs for the $220 million-plus convention center and hotel that never happened."

In April 2018, the Albany Times Union reported that the ACCA wished to sell portions of the proposed site of the Albany Convention Center to Capitalize Albany Corp.—a nonprofit economic development organization—for one dollar; Capitalize Albany reportedly expressed interest in redeveloping the property, which was described by the Times Union as a "commercial dead zone of parking lots, decrepit buildings and the former Adirondack Trailways bus station."

== See also ==
- Capital District Transportation Authority
- Hugh L. Carey Battery Park City Authority
- New York Convention Center Operating Corporation
- New York State Archives
- Olympic Regional Development Authority
- Port of Albany-Rensselaer
- Roosevelt Island Operating Corporation
- United Nations Development Corporation
- The Egg, Albany
