= History of Albany, New York (1860–1900) =

The history of Albany, New York from 1860 to 1900 begins in 1860, prior to the start of the Civil War, and ends in 1900.

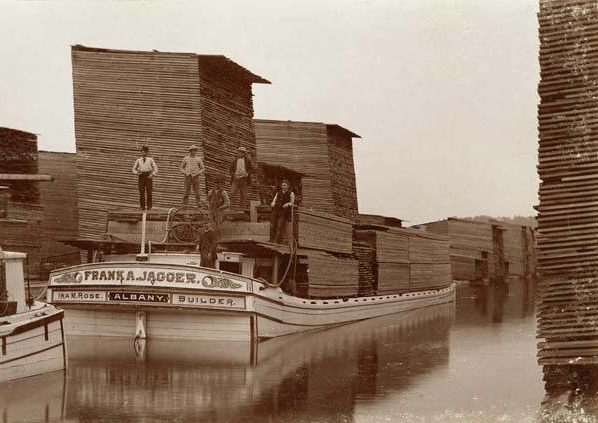
The Albany Lumber District was home to the largest lumber market in the nation in 1865.

While the key to Albany's economic prosperity in the 19th century was transportation, industry and business also played a role. Largely thanks to the city's Dutch and German roots, beer was one of its biggest commodities. Beverwyck Brewery, originally known as Quinn and Nolan (Nolan being mayor of Albany 1878–1883), was the last remaining brewer from that time when it closed in 1972. The city's location at the east end of the Erie Canal gave it unparalleled access to both raw products and a captive customer base in the west. Albany was known for its publishing houses, and to some extent, still is. Albany was second only to Boston in the number of books produced for most of the 19th century. Iron foundries in both the north and south ends of the city brought thousands of immigrants to the city. To this day, one can see many intricate wrought-iron details on older buildings. The iron industry waned by the 1890s, falling victim to the costs associated with a newly unionized workforce and the opening of mines in the Mesabi Range in Minnesota.

Albany's other major exports during the 18th and 19th centuries were furs, wheat, meat and lumber; by 1865, there were almost 4,000 saw mills in the Albany area and the Albany Lumber District was the largest lumber market in the nation. The city was also home to a number of banks. The Bank of Albany (1792–1861) was the second chartered bank in New York. The city was the original home of the Albank (founded in 1820 as the Albany Savings Bank), KeyBank (founded in 1825 as the Commercial Bank of Albany), and Norstar Bank (founded as the State Bank of Albany in 1803). American Express was founded in Albany in 1850 as an express mail business. In 1871, the northwestern portion of Albany—west from Magazine Street—was annexed to the neighboring town of Guilderland after the town of Watervliet refused annexation of said territory. In return for this loss, portions of Bethlehem and Watervliet were added to Albany. Part of the land annexed to Guilderland was ceded back to Albany in 1910, setting up the current western border.

== Overview ==
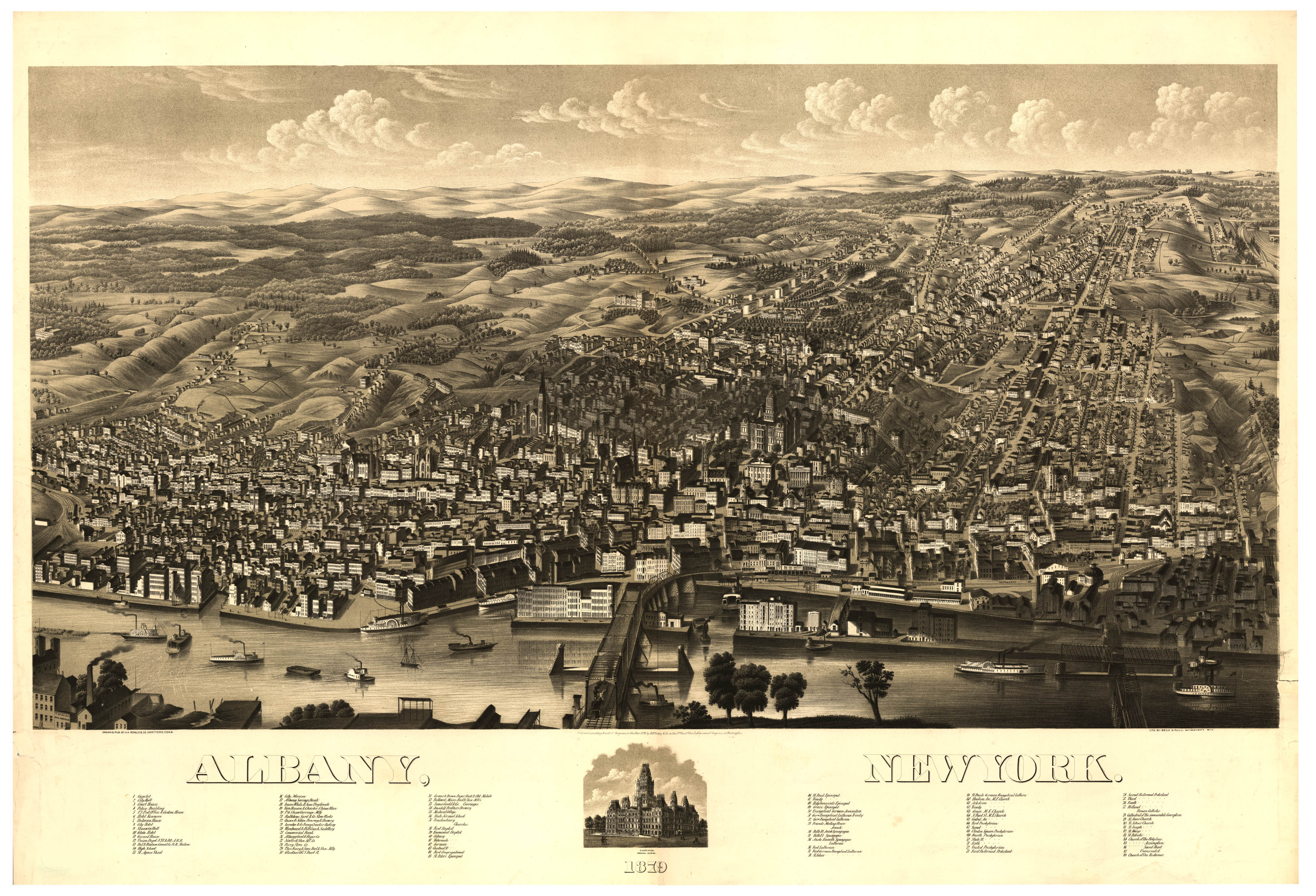
A lithograph of Albany as seen in 1879, with the Albany Basin and Maiden Lane Bridge in foreground.

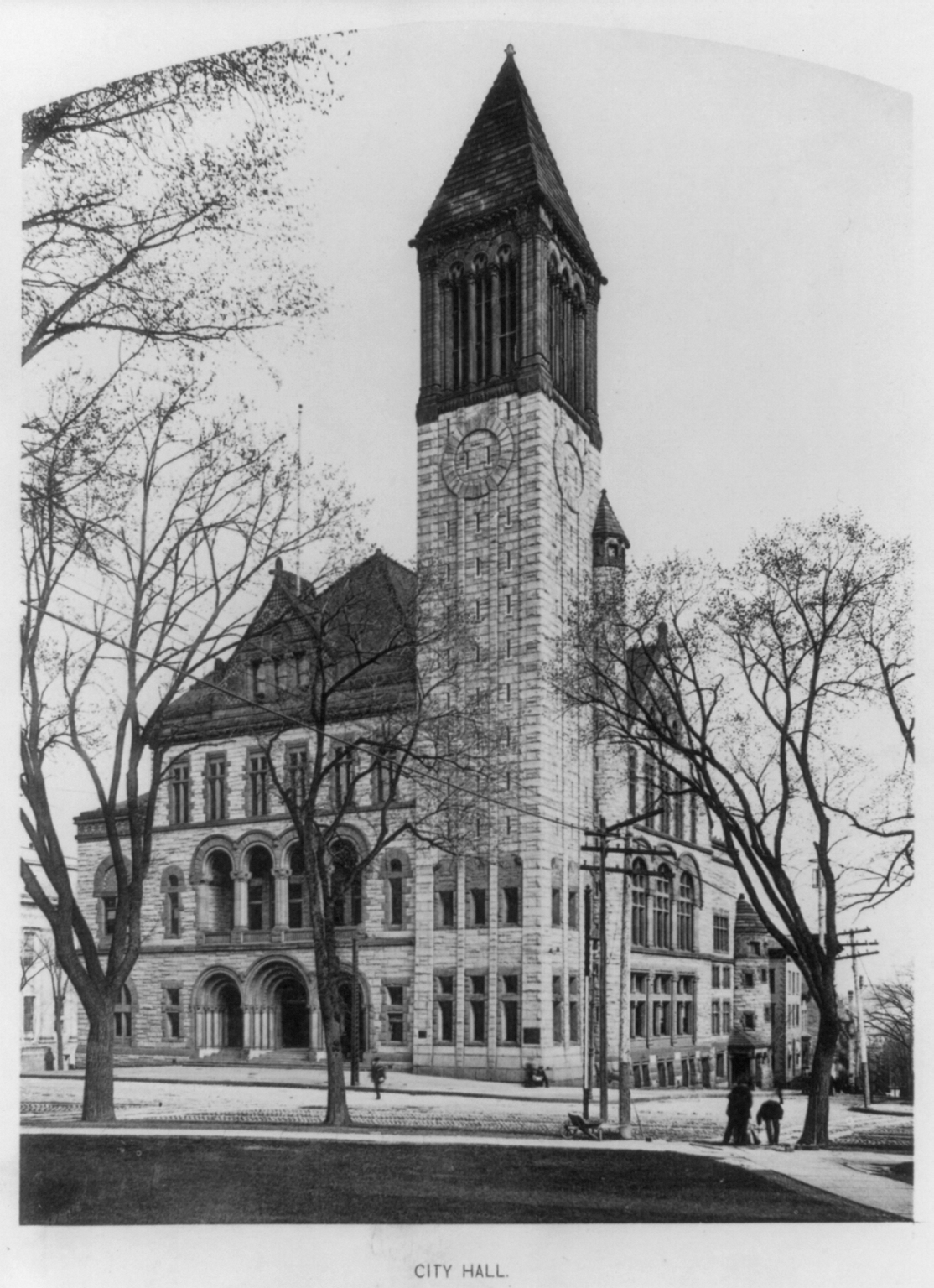
Albany City Hall in 1897, completed in 1883.

In 1860 George Thacher (Democrat) defeats John Taylor (Republican) by 735 votes. Eli Perry becomes mayor again in 1862 with 2,489 votes over George Luther the Republican candidate. George Washington Hough invents the recording barometer while director of the Dudley Observatory. In 1864 the Albany Railway Company begins intra-city service with horse cars between the corner of Broadway and State Street to the corner of Central Avenue and Northern Boulevard (today Henry Johnson Boulevard) and Eli Perry is reelected mayor by a 1,193 vote majority over John Rathbone (Republican). In 1866 former mayor George Thacher is elected over Robert Pruyn (Republican) by a 733-vote margin, the Livingston Avenue Railroad Bridge is finished in this year as well.

In 1867 the Bowery is changed to its current name of Central Avenue, Lydius Street is changed to Madison Avenue, and Madison Place gets its current name as well having previously been Madison Avenue. In 1868 Charles Bleecker defeats John Parker (Republican) by 2,836 votes. Also in 1868 Albany is created an Episcopal diocese from the New York diocese, William Doane is elected the first bishop of the Episcopal Diocese of Albany. In 1869 Christian Brothers Academy is organized. George Thacher becomes mayor again with a 1,238 vote margin over Edmund Judson (Republican), he becomes the first mayor to have veto power over the Common Council.

Prior to 1870 the city's western boundary had remained the 16-mile (26 km) limit from the Hudson River as stated in the Dongan Charter, in this year the limit is reduced to five miles (8 km), where Magazine Street is today, but the city annexes the hamlet to the north called North Albany from the town of Watervliet (today the town of Colonie) and areas to the south from the town of Bethlehem. The Maiden Lane Bridge over the Hudson in Albany is finished and the first train crosses it on December 28, 1871. Westward expansion of the city is evident in the opening of Washington Park in 1871 (lake, bridge, and lakehouse finished in 1875) and of a fifth police precinct on Central Avenue, occupying building at 270 Central Avenue in 1876 (just west of North Lake Avenue). In Albany's South End Second, Third, and Fourth avenues receive their names, formerly being in order- Whitehall Road, Van Vechten Street, and Nucella Street. George Thacher resigned in 1874 and Edmund Judson (Republican) is elected by a margin of 1,492 votes over Thomas McCarty (Democrat), Judson becomes the second Republican mayor of Albany and the first to be elected by the people. In 1875, the Irish-born in Albany make up 14,184 out of the total population of over 86,000.

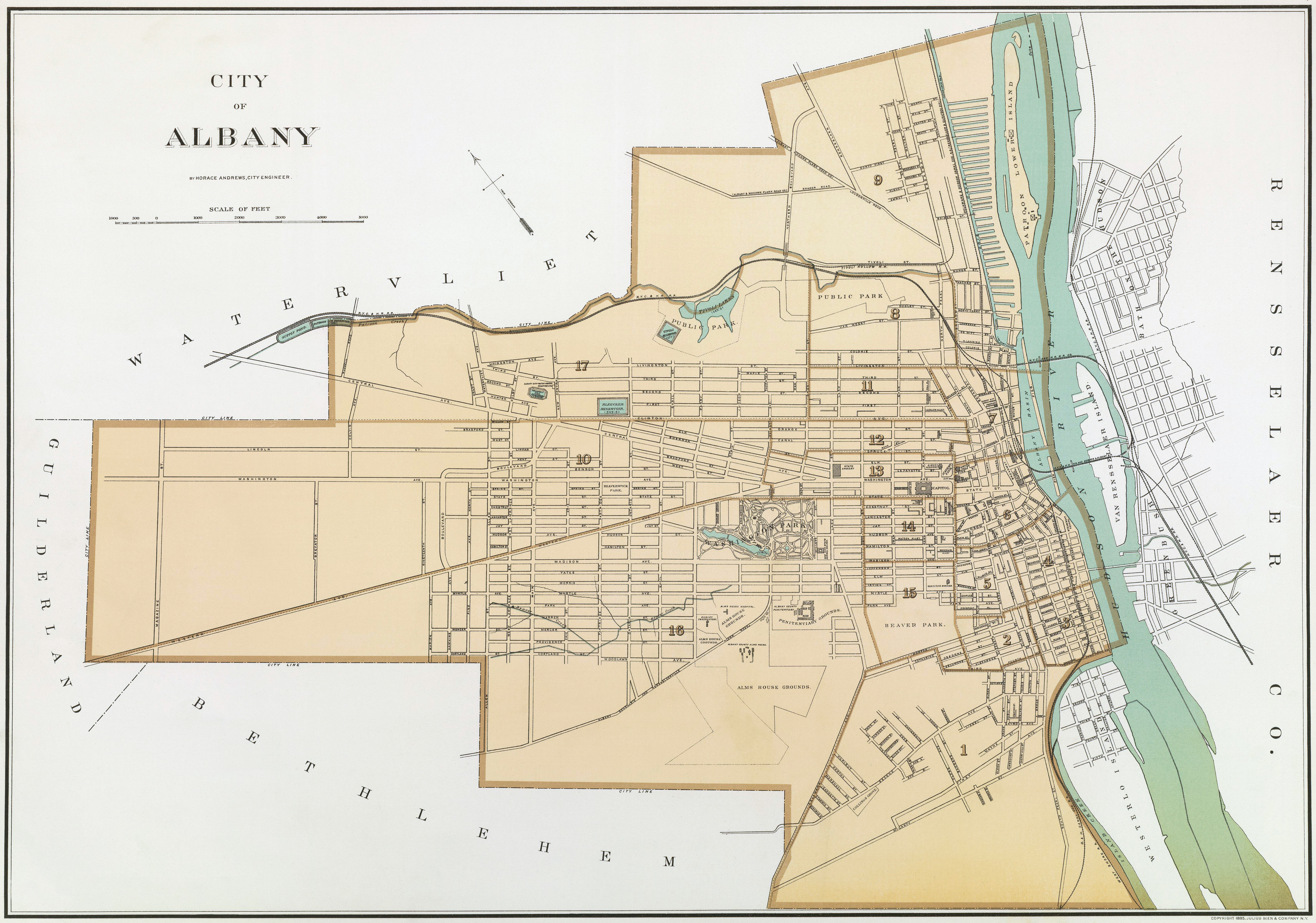
Map of Albany in 1895

New York State Capitol, begun in 1872 and completed in 1899. At a cost of $25 million it was the most expensive government building of its time.

In 1876 Anthony Banks (Democrat) defeats Mayor Judson by 1,465 votes. In that year the first Albany High School is completed, it being on Eagle Street between Columbia and Steuben Streets, today the site of the Albany County Courthouse. In 1878 Michael Nicholas Nolan (Democrat) wins election as mayor over William Young (Republican) by a 3,558 vote margin. Mayor Nolan is the first Irish and first Catholic mayor of Albany. Also in 1878 Adam Blake, the adopted son of a slave of the Van Rensselaer family opens the Kenmore Hotel at the corner of North Pearl and Columbia streets, the building still stands and is used for office space. In 1879 City Hall burns down and the Albany College of Pharmacy is organized. In 1881 electric lighting comes to Albany's streets, and in 1883 the current City Hall is completed. The election in 1882 is decided in favor of Mayor Nolan over John Swinburne but the next year the courts decide that Swinburne won and Mayor Nolan resigns. John Swinburne becomes mayor of Albany on June 25. Also In 1882 Academy Park was reconstructed with $4,500. In 1883 the West Shore Railroad connects Albany to New York and to Syracuse, by January 1, 1884 it is to Buffalo. Former Mayor Anthony Banks defeats the current mayor Michael Nolan by a margin of 250 votes in 1884. In this year the cornerstone for Cathedral of All Saints was laid, technically the building is still not complete today.

In 1886 John Thacher (Democrat) defeats Edward Durant (Republican) by 1,529 votes. In 1888 Edward Maher (Democrat) defeats Former Mayor Swinburne by 2,753 votes. In 1889 construction on the Washington Avenue Armory, at the corner of Lark Street and Washington Avenue, is begun. James Manning (Democrat) wins the mayoral election in 1890 over Republican candidate Howard Fuller by 7,236 votes. Also in this year the Hawk Street Viaduct is completed, allowing for traffic to go from Elk Street over Sheridan Hollow to Clinton Avenue. Father Burke of St. Joseph's Church (Catholic) at a meeting at City Hall encouraging the Mayor to sign the bill authorizing the bridge says, "When the bridge shall have been built, should any one be so rash as to demand its removal, he would incur the indignation of the people of Albany." The bridge is demolished in 1970. November 17, 1892 the Albany Times-Union is first published (and later drops the hyphen). Mayor Manning wins reelection in 1892 by a margin of 5,253 votes over James Warner (Republican). In 1893 the Moses statue in Washington Park is erected, a gift of Henry L. King. Oren Wilson (Republican) becomes mayor in 1894, defeating James Rooney by 3,509 votes. In 1896 former-mayor John Thacher defeats the Republican candidate William Walker by 4,278 votes. Also in 1896 the Northern Boulevard bridge is built over the New York Central Railroad's Tivoli Hollow line, it is located at the same location as the modern Northern Boulevard bridge between the Livingston Middle School and Albany Memorial Hospital.

In 1898 Thomas Van Alstyne (Democrat) becomes mayor after defeating Seldon Martin by 2,158 votes. Also in 1898 the second bridge in Albany to span Sheridan Hollow is built, this one to carry Knox Street (later renamed Northern Boulevard and today called Henry Johnson Boulevard) from Central Avenue to Spruce Street.

The current State Capitol begun in 1867, is finished in 1899 when Governor Theodore Roosevelt declares the building completed. It was inspired by the Paris City Hall. It was the most expensive government building of the time. Notable architectural features include its "Million Dollar Staircase." Also in 1899 the first automobile in Albany arrives, owned by Archibald Dederick, it is steam-powered. James Blessing (Republican) becomes mayor in 1900 after defeating Mayor Van Alstyne by 2,369 votes. In this year the Chamber of Commerce is organized.
