= List of Hudson River islands =

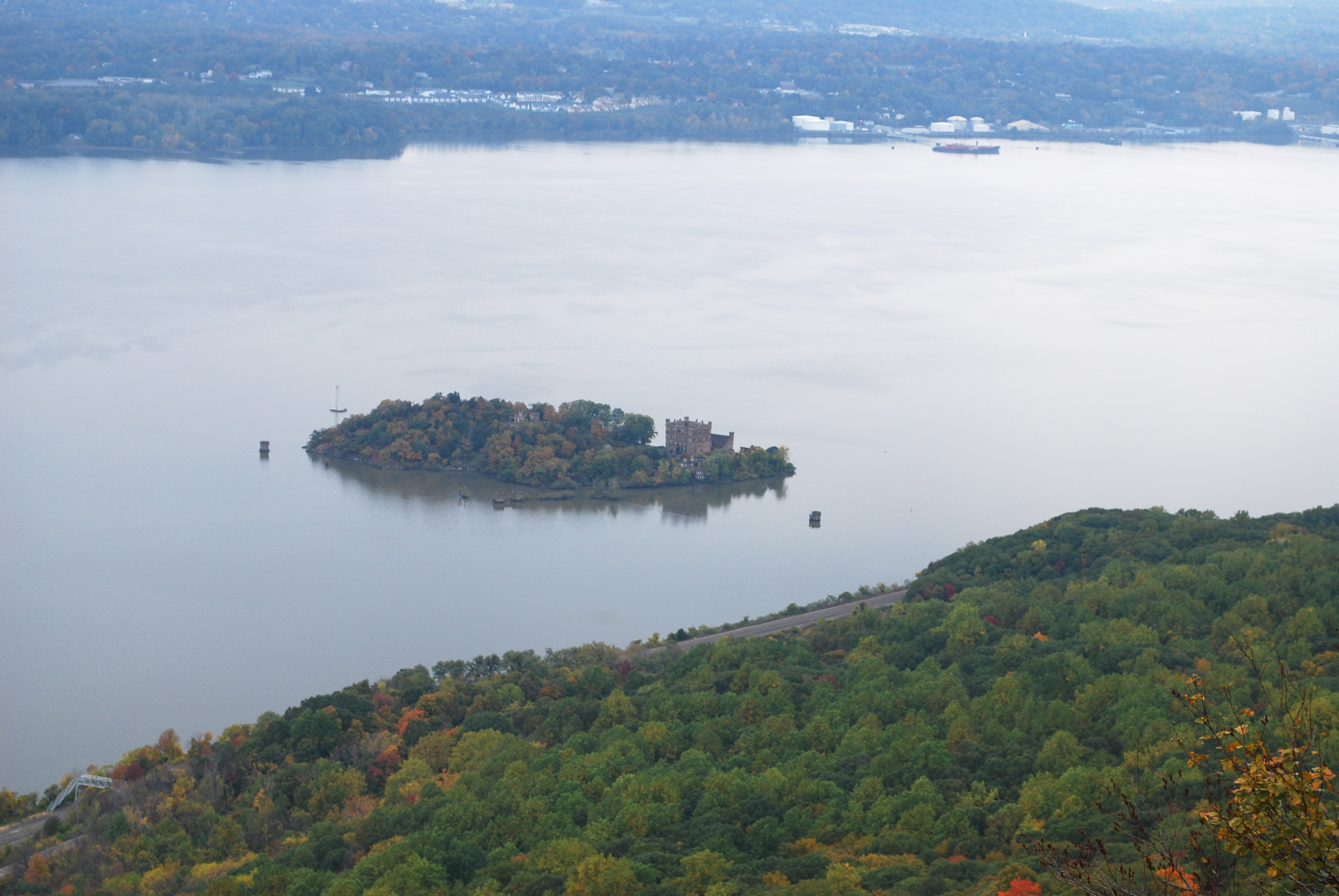
The Bannerman Castle on Pollepel Island viewed from atop Breakneck Ridge

The Hudson River in New York and New Jersey is full of islands, though some have been filled in to connect to the shore. Some of the islands have the Hudson on one side and have another river or creek on the other side. Many of the defunct islands are still labeled on NYSDOT and USGS quadrangle maps.

== Past and present islands in the Hudson River ==
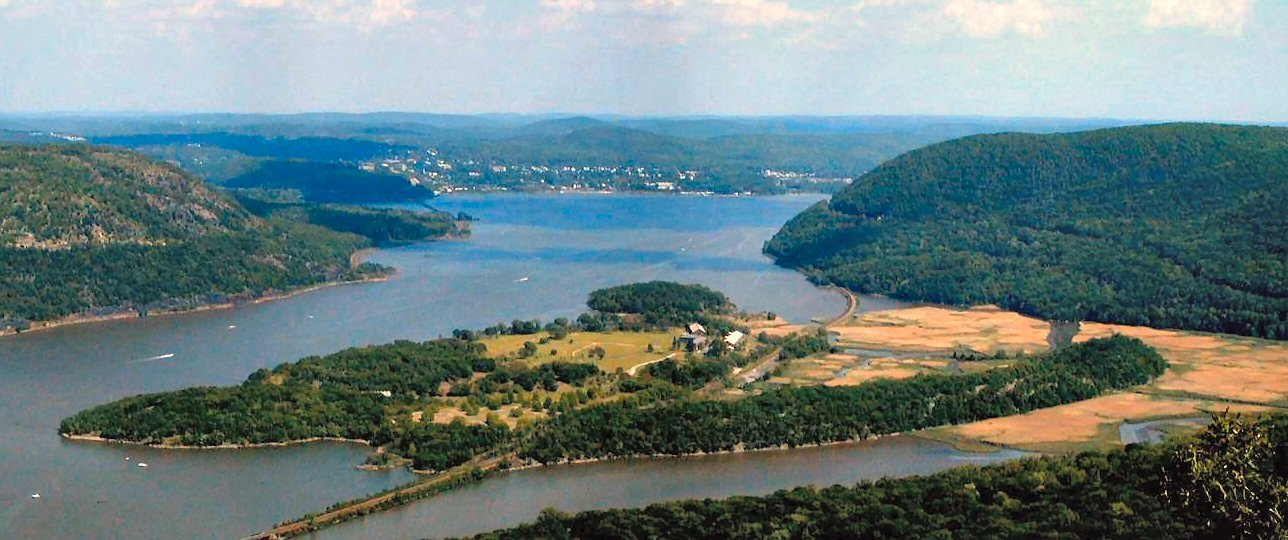
A view of Iona Island

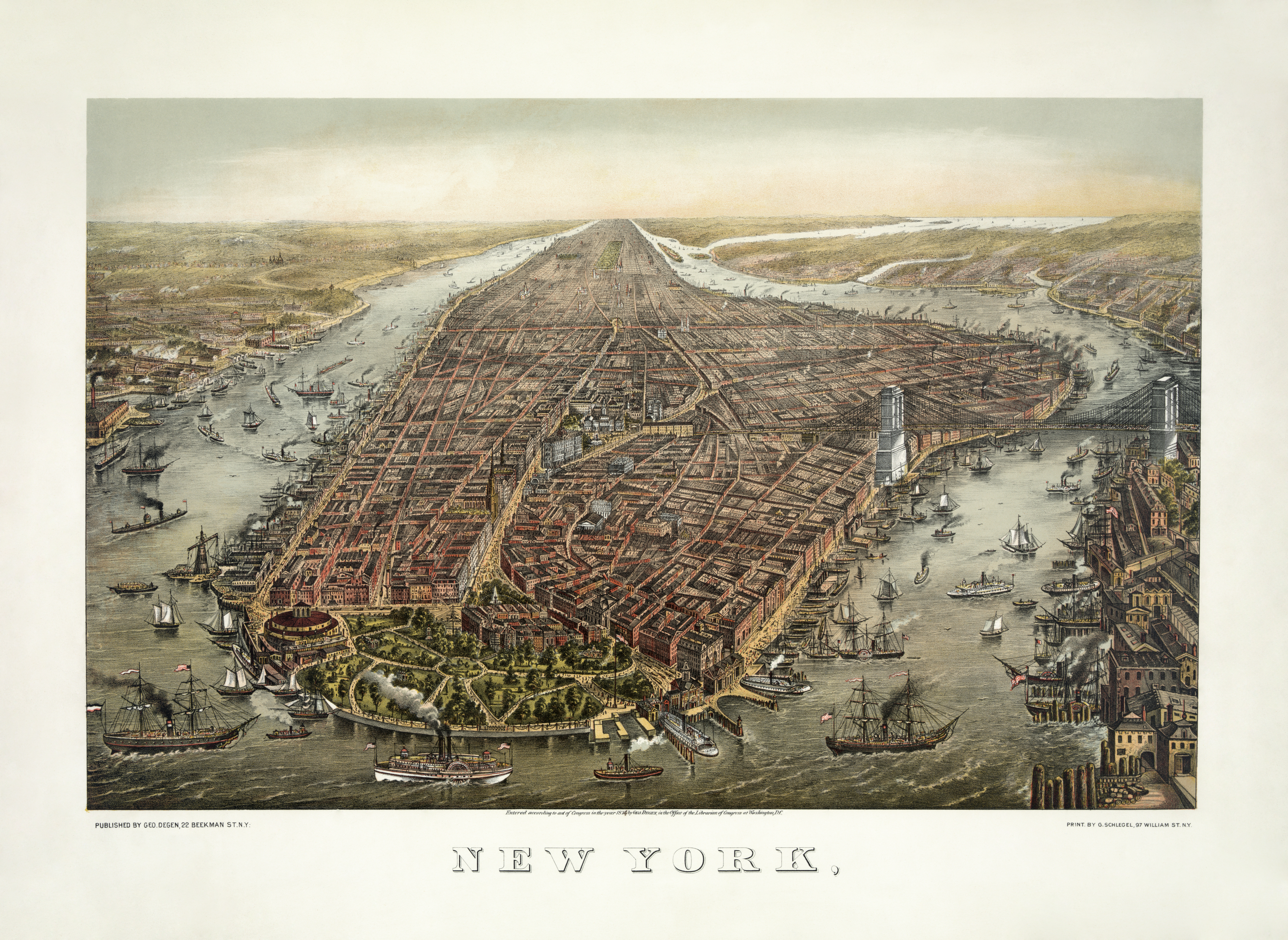
Manhattan in 1873. The Brooklyn Bridge was under construction from 1870 until 1883

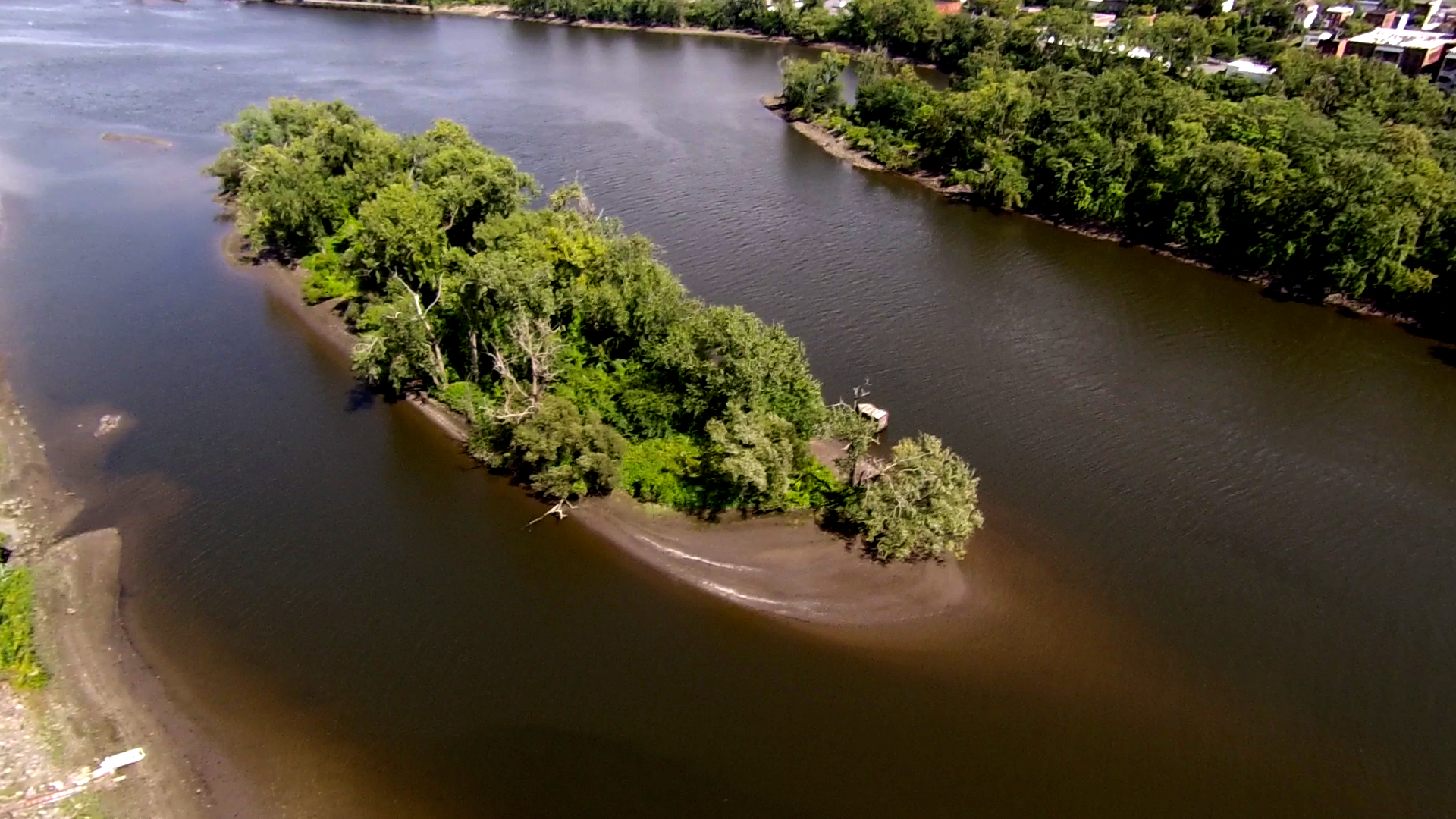
An aerial still image of Stomy Island taken from the southwest

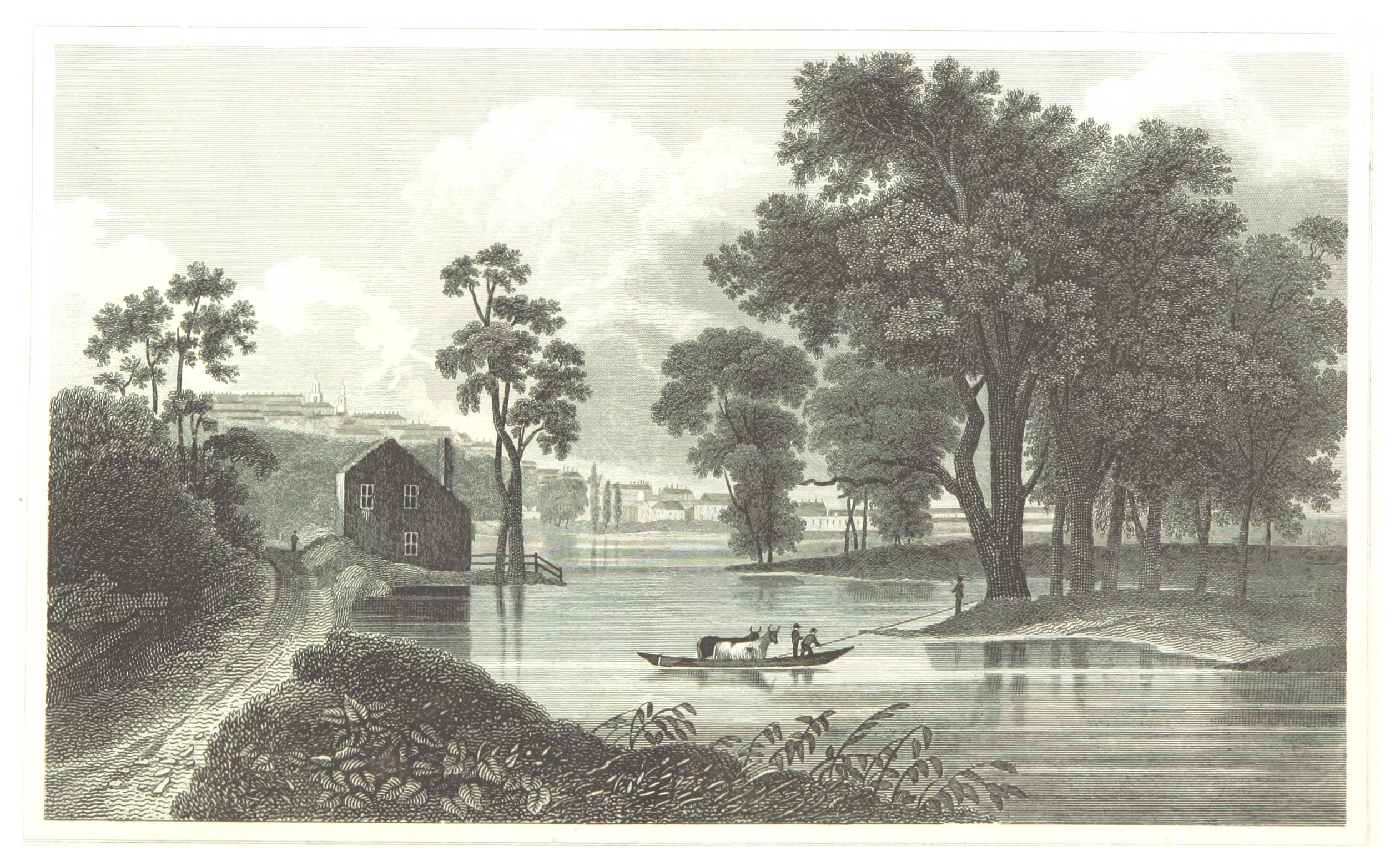
The former Van Rensselaer Island with Albany in the distance, c. 1825

This list is of past and present islands in the Hudson River and their locations;

- Adams Island, within the city of Troy, New York, Hudson River on both sides, it is east of Center Island, the Collar City Bridge carries NY Route 7 over the island's southern tip
- Bear Island, a former island in Bethlehem, New York
- Beeren Island, southern border of the Rensselaerswyck patroonship
- Breaker Island, formerly two islands called Culyer and Hillhouse, it is a former island within the town of Colonie, New York and the village of Menands, New York, filled in by the construction of exit 7 of Interstate 787 with NY Route 378, Hudson River remains on east bank and various creeks, ponds, small lakes, and marshes on the west side
- Campbell Island, now a peninsula 97 acres, Hudson River on west bank, Papscanee Creek on east bank, in Schodack, New York high grounds protected by berms, deep woods, beach, cove, underwater rights, adjacent to 72 acres of public lands, across from town of Bethlehem's park and boat launch
- Center Island, formerly called Magills Island and Starbucks Island, it is within the village and town of Green Island, the Hudson River is on both sides, the Green Island Bridge connects it to Troy, New York
- Constitution Island
- Cow Island
- Esopus Island
- Five Hook Island
- Green Island, once had a branch of the Mohawk River's delta on west side, filled in and replaced with Interstate 787
- Iona Island, located in Stony Point, New York, is a designated National Natural Landmark as a National Estuarine Research Reserve and a Significant Coastal Fish and Wildlife Habitat Area. Additionally, is serves as a bird sanctuary for Bald Eagles.
- Lower Patroon Island, formerly an island in the city of Albany, New York, was filled in by the construction of interchange of Interstate 90 (exit not numbered) and Interstate 787 (exit 5), Hudson River remains on east bank, is a part of the Corning Preserve, lends its name to the Patroon Island Bridge, which connects it to the city of Rensselaer, New York
- Manhattan, an island and a borough of New York City
- Papscanee Island, now a peninsula, Hudson River on west bank, Papscanee Creek on east bank, in Schodack, New York and East Greenbush
- Park Island, also called Island Park – a former island that hosted the Albany County Agricultural Fair in 1865, had a racetrack in 1866, and an addition of a baseball diamond and clubhouse in 1885.
- Pollepel Island, known for Bannerman's Castle serving as a tourist attraction within the Hudson Valley.
- Schermerhorn Island, a former island in Bethlehem, New York
- Schodack Island, in Schodack, New York
- Shad Island, a former island in Coeymans, New York
- Stomy Island, within the village and town of Green Island, Hudson River on both sides, north of Center Island
- Van Rensselaer Island, a former island in Rensselaer, New York
- Van Schaick Island, within the city of Cohoes, New York, Hudson River on east side and a branch of the Mohawk River on the west, 112th Street Bridge connects it to Troy, New York
- Westerlo Island, Albany, has over the past 400 years been called Castle Island, Martin Gerritse's Island, Patroon's Island, Van Rensselaer Island, and since the late 19th century Westerlo Island. (Van Rensselaer Island is also the name of a former island opposite Albany, in the city of Rensselaer.)
