= Castle Island (New York) =

Former island in Albany, New York, US

Coordinates: 42.63320°N 73.75577°W

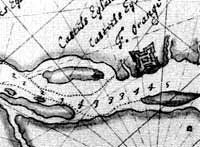
1629 map of Fort Orange and Castle Island (the island left of the fort)

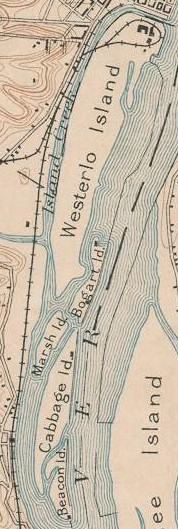
1893 map of Westerlo Island

Castle Island is a former island located in the city of Albany, Albany County, New York. Over the past 400 years, Castle Island has been referred to as Martin Gerritse's Island, Patroon's Island, Van Rensselaer Island, and—since the late 19th century—Westerlo Island. (Van Rensselaer Island is also the name of a former island opposite Albany in the city of Rensselaer.) The land known as Castle Island has been connected to the mainland with landfill dredged from the Hudson, and now forms a part of the Port of Albany.

== History ==
The area now referred to as Westerlo Island was once five separate islands: Castle Island/Westerlo Island, Cabbage Island, Bogart Island, Marsh Island, and Beacon Island.

Nineteenth and early-twentieth century historians claimed that around 1540, French fur traders built a stone "castle" or fortified trading post on Castle Island that they later abandoned. However, modern scholars have found no evidence to support this claim. The first definitive European settlement on Castle Island came in 1614 when the Dutch built Fort Nassau under the command of Hendrick Christiaensen, but in 1618 the Fort was destroyed by flooding. The island was quickly divided into farms on a lease basis from the Rensselaerswyck patroonship. The first farm on Castle Island was called "Rensselaersburgh" and was established in 1630.

The Dongan Charter of 1686, which incorporated Albany as a city, defined the City's southern boundary as the northern "tip of Marte Gerrite's island"; at the time; Castle Island was known as Marte Gerrite's island.

From 1909 to 1928, Castle Island—then known as Westerlo Island—was the site of the Quentin Roosevelt Field, the precursor to the Albany International Airport. Early aviators such as Glenn Curtiss and Charles Lindbergh landed there. In 1926, Westerlo Island was annexed by the city of Albany from the town of Bethlehem, while the other nearby islands were not. With the filling in of the shallow creek and the coastal areas of the Hudson River, Bogart Island, Marsh Island, and Beacon Island merged with Cabbage Island by 1929. Island Creek still separated Westerlo Island from the mainland and from Cabbage Island, and the Normans Kill also separated Cabbage Island from the mainland. In the 1930s, Island Creek was filled in, connecting Westerlo Island to the mainland and ending its time as an island (though it is still labeled as Westerlo Island on NYSDOT and USGS Albany quadrangle maps).

In 1932, Westerlo Island was opened as the Port of Albany, along with 35 acres (140,000 m^{2}) in the city of Rensselaer. The Canadian Pacific Railway's Kenwood Yard and railroad tracks sit on the site of the original creek. A park just north of the Port of Albany is located at the site of the former northern terminus of Island Creek with the Hudson River and retains the name Island Creek Park. By the 1950s, Cabbage Island too had merged with Westerlo Island, but the Normans Kill still flowed along its southern and western banks. The land along the Hudson River and north of the Normans Kill within the town of Bethlehem was once Cabbage Island.

== See also ==
- List of Hudson River Islands
- History of Albany, New York
