= Van Rensselaer Island =

Island in the United States of America

- Interactive map of Van Rensselaer Island

Geography
- Location: Hudson River
- Coordinates: 42°38′46″N 73°44′35″W
- Highest elevation: 25 ft (7.6 m)

Administration
- United States
- City: Rensselaer, New York

Van Rensselaer Island was an island in the Hudson River opposite the city of Albany, New York. The island was also known as de Laet's Island, Kalebacker's Island, Boston Island and B&A Island, the last two names in reference to the Boston and Albany Railroad. The island stretched from Mill Creek north to the Livingston Avenue Bridge. Van Rensselaer Island is now connected to the City of Rensselaer, and is no longer an island.

Van Rensselaer Island was also a name given to Westerlo Island in Albany, today the Port of Albany-Rensselaer.

== History ==
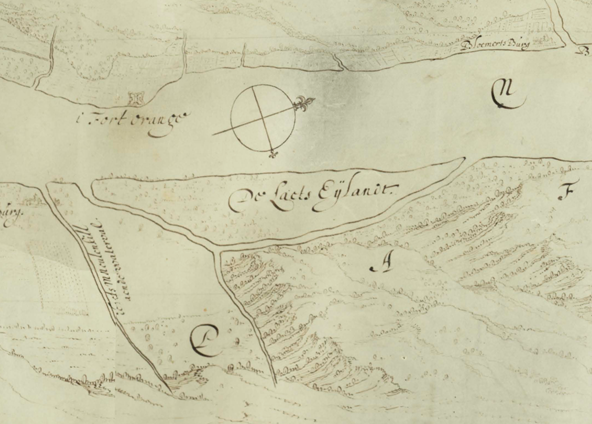
De Laet's Island, on the original Map of Rensselaerswyck, c. 1632; north is to the right

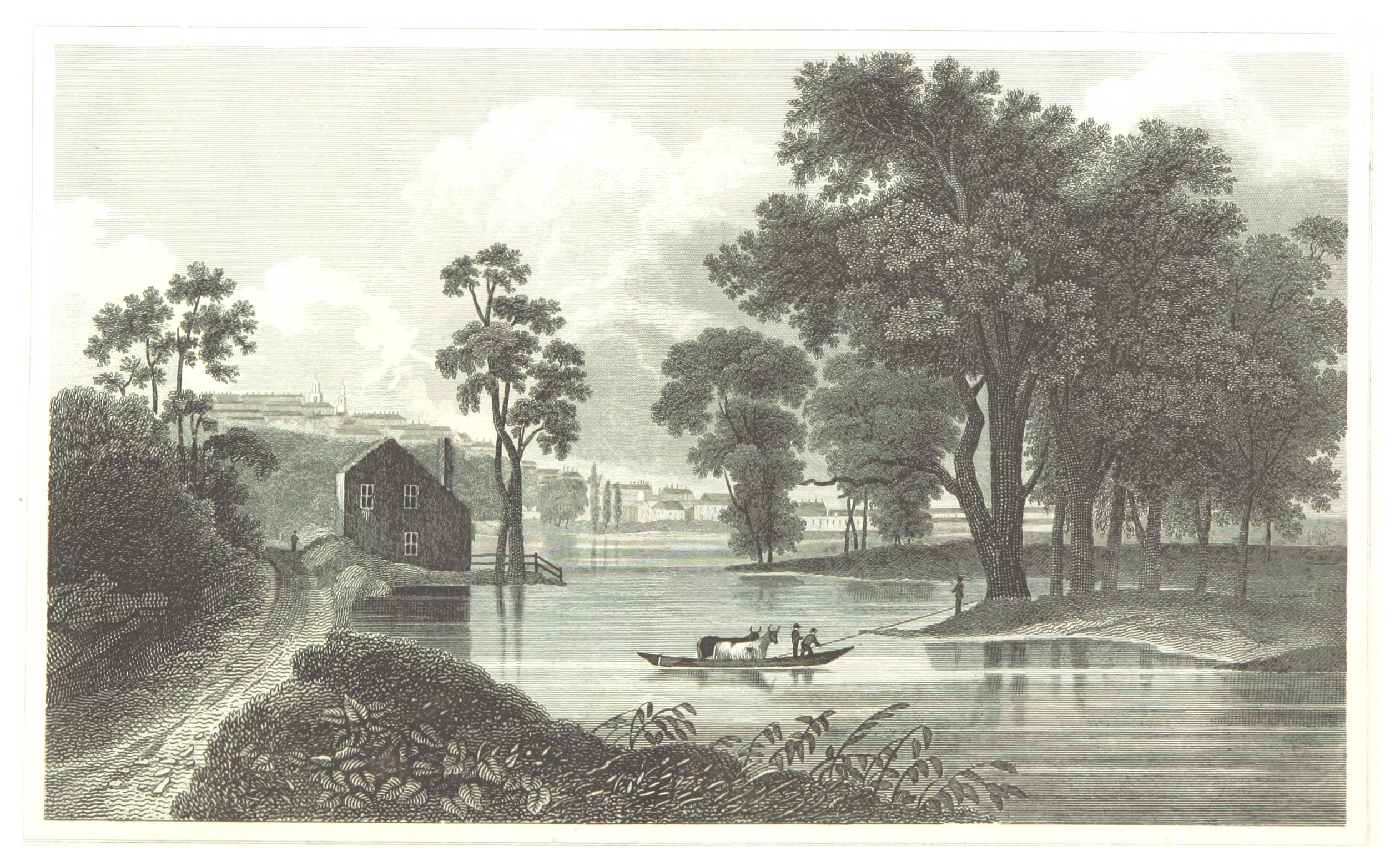
Van Rensselaer Island with Albany in the distance, c. 1825

The island went through many name changes in the 400 years since Henry Hudson saw it when he was at the present-day site of Albany. The name Kalebacker's Island may be related to the Dutch term "kale backer", translated into English it means down-and-outer, or mean fellow; the term Kalebacker was the term used by the Dutch for Native Americans who possessed guns, and were regarded as troublesome and war-like. There was a settlement of Native Americans who moved to the island after the Dutch established Fort Orange across the Hudson from the island, they apparently moved there in order to trade with the Dutch, they had a fort, village, and crop fields. The site is listed in the New York State Office of Parks, Recreation and Historic Preservation archaeological files, but not within the New York State Museum site files. The name De Laets Eylandt (de Laet's Island in English) was in honor of Joannes de Laet, given in the 1630s by Kiliaen van Rensselaer, the first Patroon of the Rensselaerswyck, a feudal estate encompassing Albany and Rensselaer counties. On May 1, 1658 Jan Baptist van Rensselaer, the director of the patroonship leased to Arent Adriessen all the tilled land on the island, which was referred to as "the island opposite the center of the village of Beverwyck". The lease was set for four years.

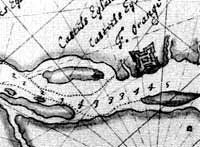
Van Rensselaer Island is across the Hudson River from Fort Orange. In this map north is to the right.

In the 1800s the island became the site of the Boston and Albany Railroad's (B&A) passenger depot, shops, freight houses, round house, and coach yard. The island was the site of transfers between trains of the New York Central and the B&A. The island became known as the Boston and Albany Island, or just Boston Island. A ferry transported people to and from the island and downtown Albany at Maiden Lane. The railroad changed the shoreline of the island by building docks for receiving coal and grain and by dredging an east–west channel splitting the island in half. In 1871 the Maiden Lane Bridge was built replacing the ferry. When the NY Central and the B&A merged in 1900 the island's activities became less important, though a new round house and coach yard was built even as many buildings were demolished. In 1903 the channel that separated the island from the mainland was filled in with sand dredged from the bottom of the Hudson River. Also in 1903 the New York Central and Hudson River Railroad purchased outright the island from the van Rensselaer family for $6,000.

The Maiden Lane Bridge and all the railroad associated buildings were demolished when in 1969 the Rensselaer City School District's school campus was built on the portion of the island north of Quackenderry Creek. Two years earlier the Rensselaer side approach and exit ramps for the Dunn Memorial Bridge were built on the southern part of the island, just north of Mill Creek. The site of the Rensselaer City School campus is slated to be redeveloped as a mixed-use waterfront community, the developers (U.W. Marx Construction) gave the school land that had recently been annexed from a neighboring town, now in the northern section of the city, and built a new school campus. The redevelopment of 24 acres (9.7 ha) of the island is named de Laet's Landing in honor of Johan de Laet and the original name of the island. De Laet's Landing is a 1,500,000-square-foot (140,000 m^{2}) project estimated at costing about $300 million, and could take 10–15 years to build to completion. The project would include offices, retail, restaurants, apartments, a promenade along the Hudson, and a marina carved from the waterfront; it is modeled on Baltimore's Inner Harbor. The project was dealt a setback in late 2009 when the New York State Department of Environmental Conservation declared that the project's marina would need to be reworked so as not to disturb he water celery along the shoreline, which is important for keeping the water clean and provides habitat for fish, it is rare along that stretch of the Hudson due to dredging of the shipping channel. This set-back, however, has not stopped the project; de Laet's Landing has been approved for a $1.4 million grant by the Empire State Development Corporation and the company planned on breaking ground sometime in the later half of 2010. As of June 2014, no construction project has begun; however, casino development has been proposed for this location.

== Geology ==
Today the island is no longer an island as the channel to the east has been filled. The area consists of Middle Ordovician bedrock made of Normanskill shale, with soil consisting of loamy and sandy udorthents dredged from the bottom of the Hudson River. During the 17th century the island probably had an elevation of about 10 feet (3.0 m) or less above the river, today it is about 25 feet. Mill Creek enters the Hudson River at the southern end of the island. In the past the Quackenderry Creek emptied into the Hudson at the channel between the island and the mainland, today the creek continues through the area.
