= Livingston Avenue Bridge =

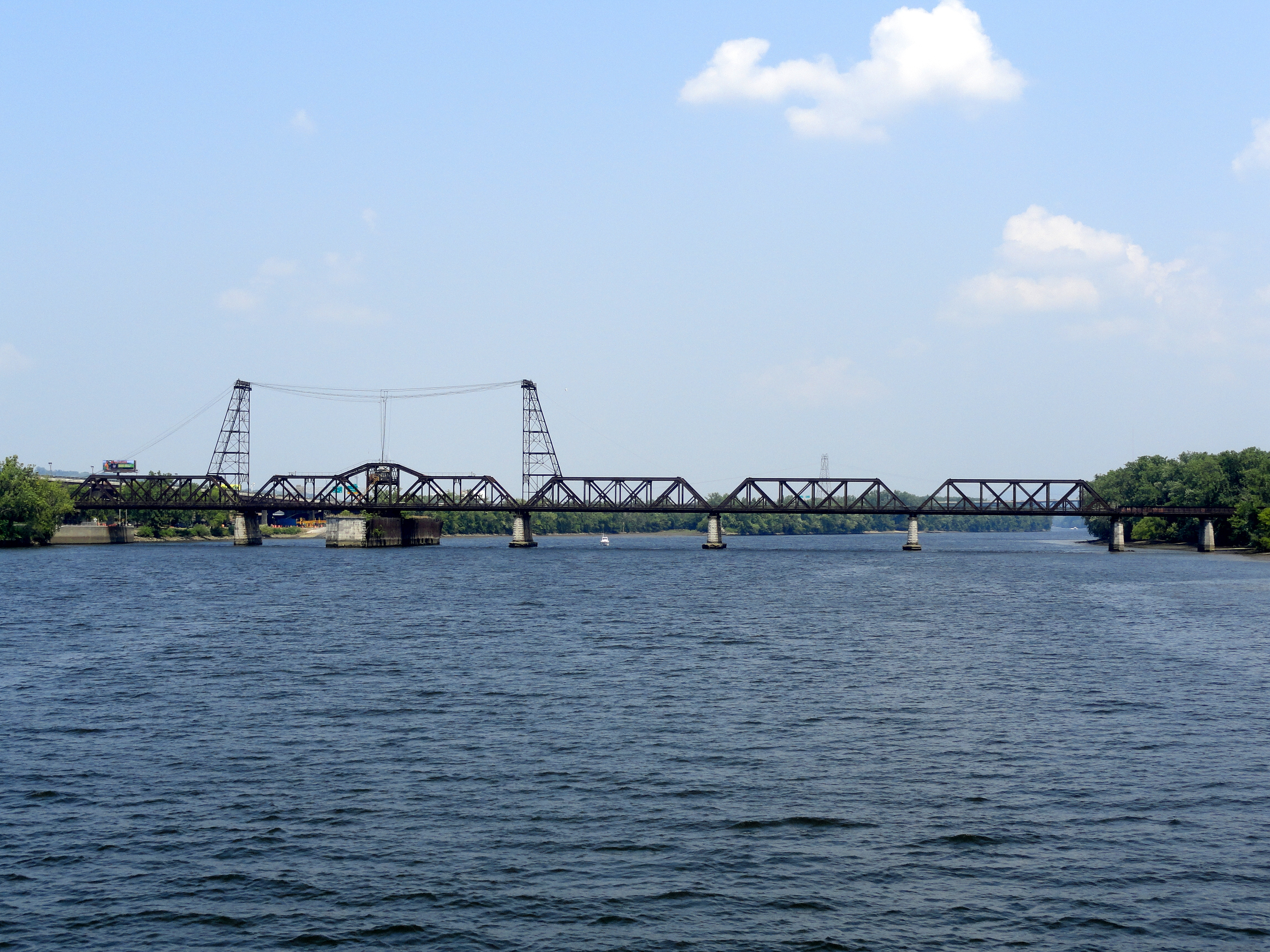
- Coordinates: 42.65431°N 73.741777°W
- Carries: Amtrak, CSX and CP Rail
- Crosses: Hudson River
- Locale: Albany and Rensselaer, New York
- Other name: North Bridge or Hudson River Bridge
- Owner: CSX Transportation

Characteristics
- Design: Pratt through truss with swing span
- Total length: 1,272 feet (388 m)
- Longest span: 259.9 feet (79.2 m)
- No. of spans: 1 truss swing span, 4 truss spans, 4 girder spans

Rail characteristics
- No. of tracks: 2

History
- Constructed by: New York Central Railroad
- Fabrication by: American Bridge Company
- Construction start: 1901
- Opened: 1902

Statistics
- Daily traffic: 12 Amtrak passenger trains and 2–6 freight trains (as of 2024)

Location
- Interactive map of Livingston Avenue Bridge

References
- BridgeHunter.com

The Livingston Avenue Bridge is a railroad bridge over the Hudson River in New York connecting Albany and Rensselaer. The original structure was built in 1866 by the Hudson River Bridge Company but was replaced in 1901–02. A rotating swing bridge span allows large ships to proceed up the river.

The New York State Department of Transportation (DOT) has identified the bridge as a critical link in its Empire Corridor passenger rail line, and has initiated a study project for bridge rehabilitation or replacement.

== Operation ==
The bridge was purchased from CSX in December 2012 as part of Amtrak's Empire Corridor lease. The lease grants Amtrak ownership and control over the bridge and adjoining 100 miles of track, extending east from Hoffmans, NY to Albany-Rensselaer station; then south to MP 75, just north of Poughkeepsie, NY. A small branch extends east from Albany-Rensselaer station down the Post-Road subdivision, where Amtrak's ownership terminates just south of the Interstate 90 Berkshire Spur overpass. The Livingston Avenue Bridge is most frequently used for east-west travel in New York, as well as freight trains of CSX and CP Rail. The bridge hosts an active railroad interlocking tower and Amtrak block operators staff the tower 24 hours a day. They are responsible for directing rail traffic around Amtrak's Rensselaer Terminal and nearby trackage as well as opening and closing the bridge. Due to the deteriorated condition of the bridge, trains cross one at a time at 15 miles per hour (24 km/h). DOT considers the swing bridge mechanism to be unreliable and the overall bridge design inadequate for current railroad operating standards. The bridge opens for ship traffic about 400 times per year.

== History ==
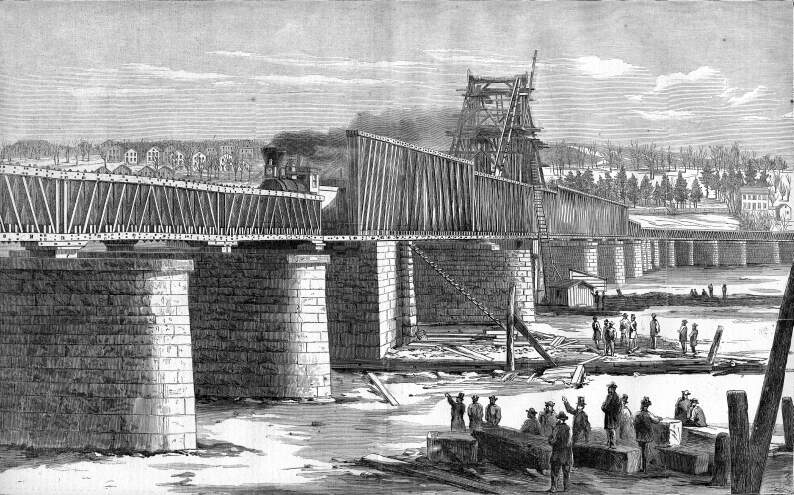
The original bridge in 1866

The Hudson River Bridge Company was incorporated April 9, 1856. Work on the bridge was begun in April 1864. The earlier Green Island Bridge had opened to the north in Troy in 1835, but required the longer route of the Schenectady and Troy Railroad west from Troy. The new bridge, called the Hudson River Bridge, was to connect directly to the New York Central Railroad on the west (Albany) side of the bridge and to the Hudson River Railroad, Troy and Greenbush Railroad, and Boston and Albany Railroad on the east (Rensselaer) side. The turntable bridge was 4800 feet (1500 m) long, with a clearance of 30 feet (9 m) from high water when closed.

The first engine, the Augustus Schell, passed over the bridge on February 18, 1866. Passenger trains started using it on February 22. After the Maiden Lane Bridge was constructed a bit further south, the Hudson River Bridge was used mostly for freight trains and the few passenger trains that passed by Albany but did not need to stop there. The Maiden Lane Bridge was often referred to as the "South Bridge" and the Hudson River Bridge as the "North Bridge". In the winter of 1866, once travel patterns were set, Cornelius Vanderbilt, owner of the Hudson River Railroad, suddenly refused to allow any transfers from the New York Central. According to the documentary The Men Who Built America the motivation for this closure was retaliation against the owners of New York Central for negotiating a new contract in bad faith. The New York Central board gave in, and in 1867 Vanderbilt acquired the company, and in 1869 merged it with the Hudson River Railroad to form the New York Central and Hudson River Railroad. This gave the New York Central a majority of ownership in the company. In 1900, the New York Central leased the Boston and Albany.

The current bridge was constructed in 1901-2 and was named the Livingston Avenue Bridge. The 1902 bridge was built upon the original 1866 pilings. At the time the original Hudson River Bridge was constructed, Livingston Avenue had been named Lumber Street, as it led to the Albany Lumber District.

== Rehabilitation study ==
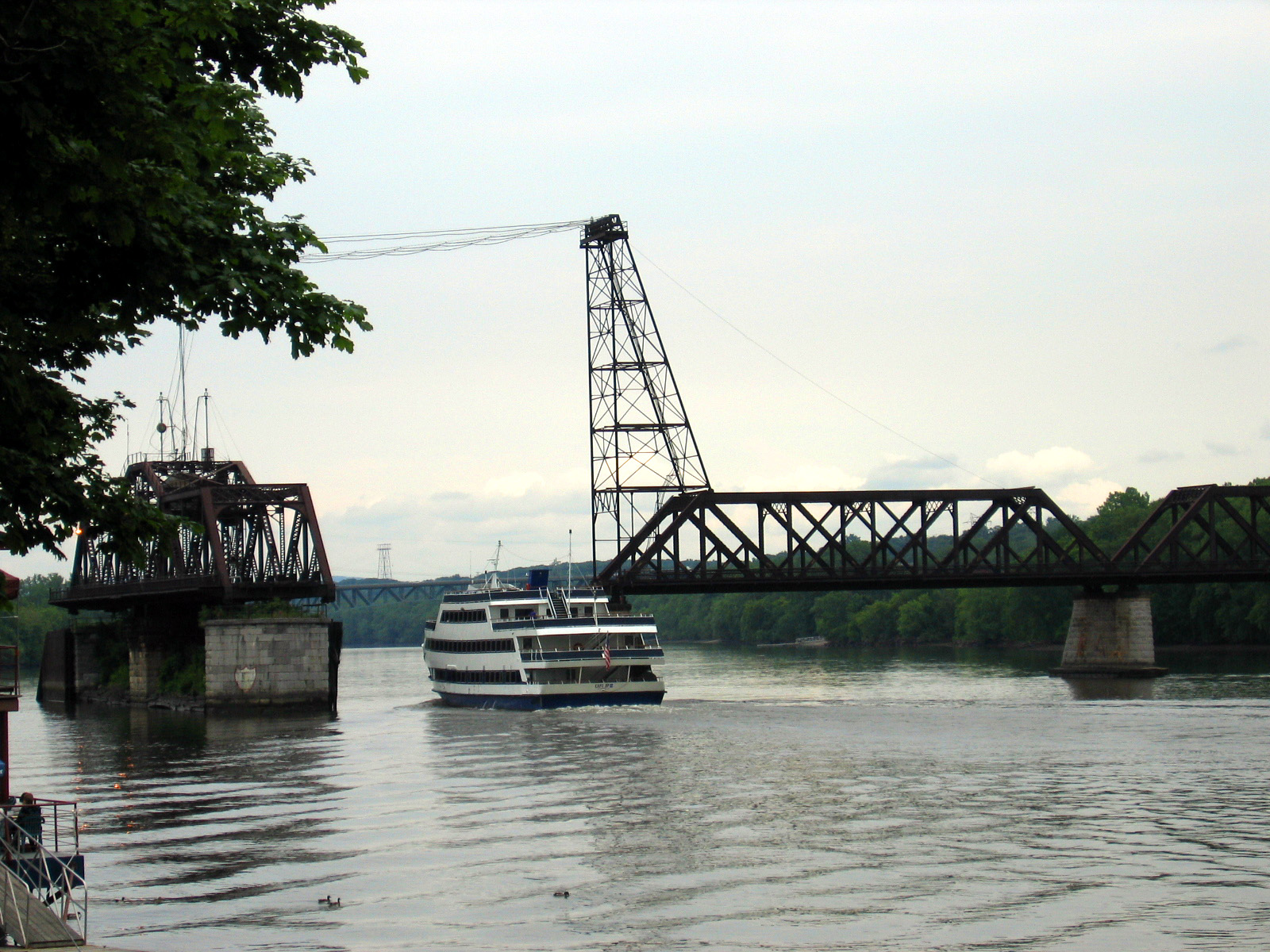
A tour boat heading north passes through the Livingston Avenue Bridge

As of 2012, the NYSDOT was evaluating whether to rehabilitate or replace the structure. The cost to replace the bridge was estimated at $50 million in 1998. Decisions about rehabilitation included consideration of upgrading the bridge to accommodate high-speed rail traffic. Funding for construction had not yet been allocated. One matter of contention was whether the project will restore the closed public walkway over the bridge. Doing so would greatly improve pedestrian access between Albany and Rensselaer, but the bridge owner, CSX, was citing safety concerns. In 2022, the NYSDOT held public meetings to discuss a project to rebuild the bridge.

== Replacement ==
In July 2024, Skanska, a Swedish construction company, was selected to replace the current bridge with a $634.8 million, two-track bridge.. The new lift bridge will consist of 7 spans, will be able to handle taller and heavier loads, and will allow two trains to cross at the same time.

The bridge replacement will also include the construction of necessary control and machinery rooms, new railroad signals, overhauling of electrical infrastructure, bridge and navigation lighting, and track improvements to the east of the bridge in Rensselaer. Rail bridges over Water and Centre Street will also be reconfigured and rehabilitated as part of the project.

Completion of construction was targeted for the summer of 2028.

== See also ==
- List of crossings of the Hudson River
