= List of mayors of Rensselaer, New York =

A total of 35 individuals have served as mayor since the city's incorporation in 1897, some serving numerous terms. John DeFrancesco (Democrat) is the current mayor; he was first elected in 2025 and began service on January 1, 2026.

On April 23, 1897, Governor Frank S. Black granted a law under Chapter 359 creating the municipality that would be known as the City of Rensselaer.

Charles S. Allen served as the first mayor of the new municipality. The first meeting of the common council of the City of Rensselaer was ordered by Mayor Allen to take place on Tuesday evening April 27, 1897 at 8:30 pm.

== Nineteenth century ==
#	Portrait	Mayor	Start	End	Party	Comment
1		Charles S. Allen	1897	1899		The first mayor of the City of Rensselaer, New York. Charles Allen convened the first common council meeting in the City of Rensselaer on April 27, 1897. Charles Allen was a graduate of Vermont Medical College. During the Civil War, he was an assistant surgeon of the 125th New York Volunteer Infantry. Allen was also coroner of Rensselaer County for nine years and president of the village of Greenbush.
2		James I. Miles	1900	1901		

== Twentieth century ==
#	Portrait	Mayor	Start	End	Party	Comment
3		Bradford R. Lansing	1901		Republican	Grocer and pork dealer. Bradford Lansing was born in Niskayuna, NY in 1860. He became Mayor of Rensselaer in 1901. Lansing was a member of the NYS Assembly between 1906–1912.
4		Thomas Kimber	1904	1907		
5		W. Rockefeller	1908	1911		
6		Thomas Penny	1911	1913		Chaplain of Masonic Greenbush Lodge Chapter, No. 274 in 1911.
7		Fred A. Rohloff	1914	1915		
8		John H. McIntyre	1915	1918		Appointed Sheriff by the Governor of New York on June 30, 1921.
9		John S. Hall	1919	1920		Served on the Committee on Literacy Program in 1919.
10		Henry Meurs	1921	1922	Republican	Hardware dealer. Henry Meurs was a member of the NYS Assembly representing the 2nd District of Rensselaer County in 1924.
11		Harvey C. Younghans	1923	1925		Harvey Younghans served as mayor for a short time. Several years later, Younghans served as city clerk.
12		James W. Adams	1926	1929	Republican	Previously served as city treasurer.
13		Clarence A. McNally	1930	1931	Democrat	Alternate delegate to Democratic National Convention from New York in 1960. Clarence McNally served as Mayor during the 1930s and the 1950s.
14		James Johnstone	1932	1935		
15		William T. Wright	1936	1939	Republican	
16		Marshall C. Rose	1940	1941	Democrat	
17		Charles G. Maloy	1943	1945		Charles Maloy did not finish his term in office and resigned for unknown reasons.
18		Thomas S. H. Clark	1945	1953	Democrat	
19		W. Hardt	1953	1953		
20		Clarence A. McNally	1954	1961		See first entry above
21		John H. Warden	1966	1971		
22		Irwin Stewart	1972	1973		
23		Joseph P. Mink	1974	1981		
24		Thomas E. Henry III	1981	1983		Mayor Henry was removed from office in 1983 following his conviction for official misconduct and obstructing governmental administration after threatening an alderman to vote a specific way.
25		Edward J. Finlan	1983	1983	Democrat	Edward Finlan was instated as Mayor of Rensselaer following Mayor Henry's conviction. Finlan had previously served as President of the city council. Under the city charter, the next in the line of succession to fill a vacancy in the mayor's office is the council president.
26		Joseph E. Harrigan	1984	1993		
27		John F. Ryan	1994	1996		
28		Joseph Kapp	1996	1996	Republican	
29		Edward J. Finlan	1997	1997	Democrat	
30		Linda M. Ganance	1998	2001	Democrat	

== Twenty-first century ==
#	Portrait	Mayor	Start	End	Party	Comment
31		Mark G. Pratt	2002	2005	Republican	Mark Pratt was a Republican mayor who ran on a bipartisan platform. He made significant changes even though he faced opposition. Due to forging ahead to make great positive change, he was accused of gas theft and the judge dismissed all charges as there was no wrongdoing.
32		Daniel J. Dwyer	2006	2018	Democrat	Daniel Dwyer was a past City Alderman and the 32nd Mayor of Rensselaer. Mayor Dwyer died in November 2018 after serving as Mayor for 12 years.
33		Richard J. Mooney	2019	2019	Democrat	Richard Mooney was a past City Alderman, Council President and the 33rd Mayor of Rensselaer. Under the city charter, Mooney was instated as Mayor following the death of Mayor Daniel Dwyer in 2018.
34		Michael E. Stammel	2020	2025	Republican	Michael Stammel previously served as a City Alderman and a Legislator on the Rensselaer County Legislature from 2002-2021. From 2017-2021 he served as its Chairman.
35		John A. DeFrancesco	2026	Present	Democrat	John DeFrancesco was a past City Alderman and Council Pro Tempore. Under the city charter, DeFrancesco was instated as Council President when Ricard Mooney became Mayor following the death of Mayor Daniel Dwyer in 2018. DeFrancesco was elected Council President in 2019 and again in 2021. In 2025 he was elected as Mayor, a position he currently holds.
