= Maiden Lane Bridge =

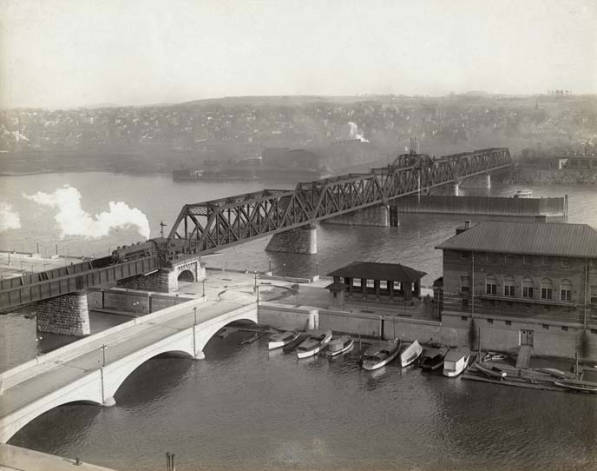
- Maiden Lane Bridge with Rensselaer in background, Albany Yacht Club in foreground.
- Coordinates: 42°38′52″N 73°44′45″W
- Carries: New York Central and Hudson River Railroad
- Crosses: Hudson River
- Locale: Albany and Rensselaer, NY
- Official name: Maiden Lane Bridge

History
- Opened: 1871
- Closed: 1960s

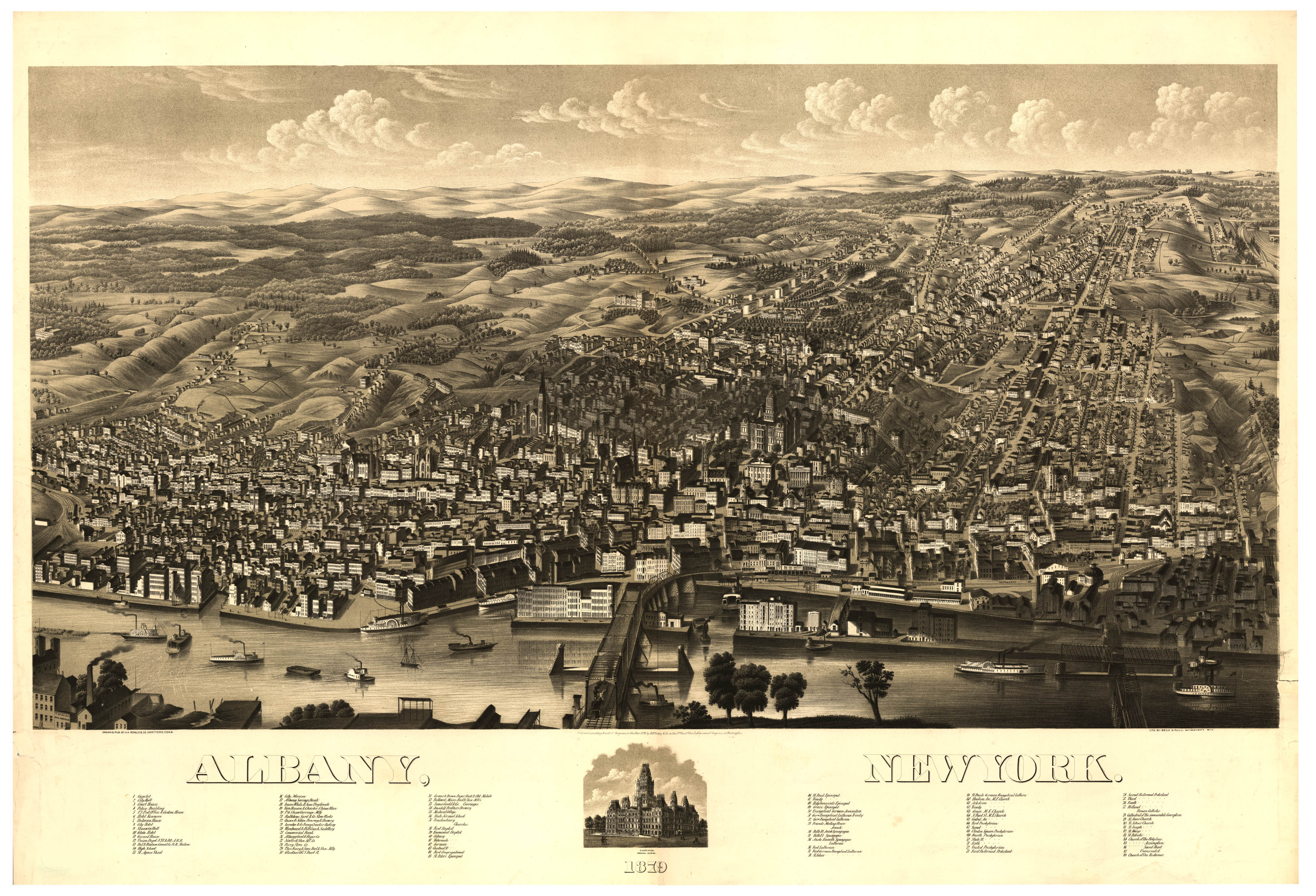
A lithograph of Albany as seen in 1879, with the Albany Basin and Maiden Lane Bridge in foreground.

The Maiden Lane Bridge was a railroad bridge across the Hudson River between the city of Albany and Rensselaer County, New York. It was designed by Kellogg, Clark & Co., and was one of the largest bridges they designed. The bridge was owned and built by the Hudson River Bridge Company, which was owned jointly by the New York Central and Hudson River Railroad Company which owned 3/4, and the Boston and Albany Railroad Company which owned 1/4. The Maiden Lane Bridge was often referred to as the "South Bridge", while the Livingston Avenue Bridge was referred to as the "North Bridge". The Livingston Ave. Bridge was used for freight (and through-traffic passenger trains) while passenger trains used the Maiden Lane Bridge for access to Union Station, which was completed less than 10 months later. The state of New York authorized construction on May 10, 1869, construction began in May 1870, and the first train crossed on December 28, 1871. The bridge consisted of four 185.5-foot (56.5 m) long fixed spans, one 274-foot (84 m) long draw span, seven 73-foot (22 m) long spans over the Albany Basin, one 110-foot (34 m) long span over Quay Street, and one 63-foot (19 m) long span over Maiden Lane. All the spans except the one over Maiden Lane were double tracked, through, and pin connected; the span over Maiden Lane was also double tracked, but was a deck and plate girder span. A reconstruction of the bridge, except for the draw span, was done in 1899 by Pencoyd Bridge Company and finished by January 3, 1900. The bridge lasted until the 1960s, when the Albany–Rensselaer Amtrak station was built on the east side of the Hudson in the city of Rensselaer and Interstate 787 was built along the west side in Albany, thereby eliminating the need for the bridge.

== See also ==
- History of Albany, New York
- Downtown Albany Historic District
- List of fixed crossings of the Hudson River
