= Rensselaer, New York =

City in Rensselaer County, New York, US

- City
- City of Rensselaer
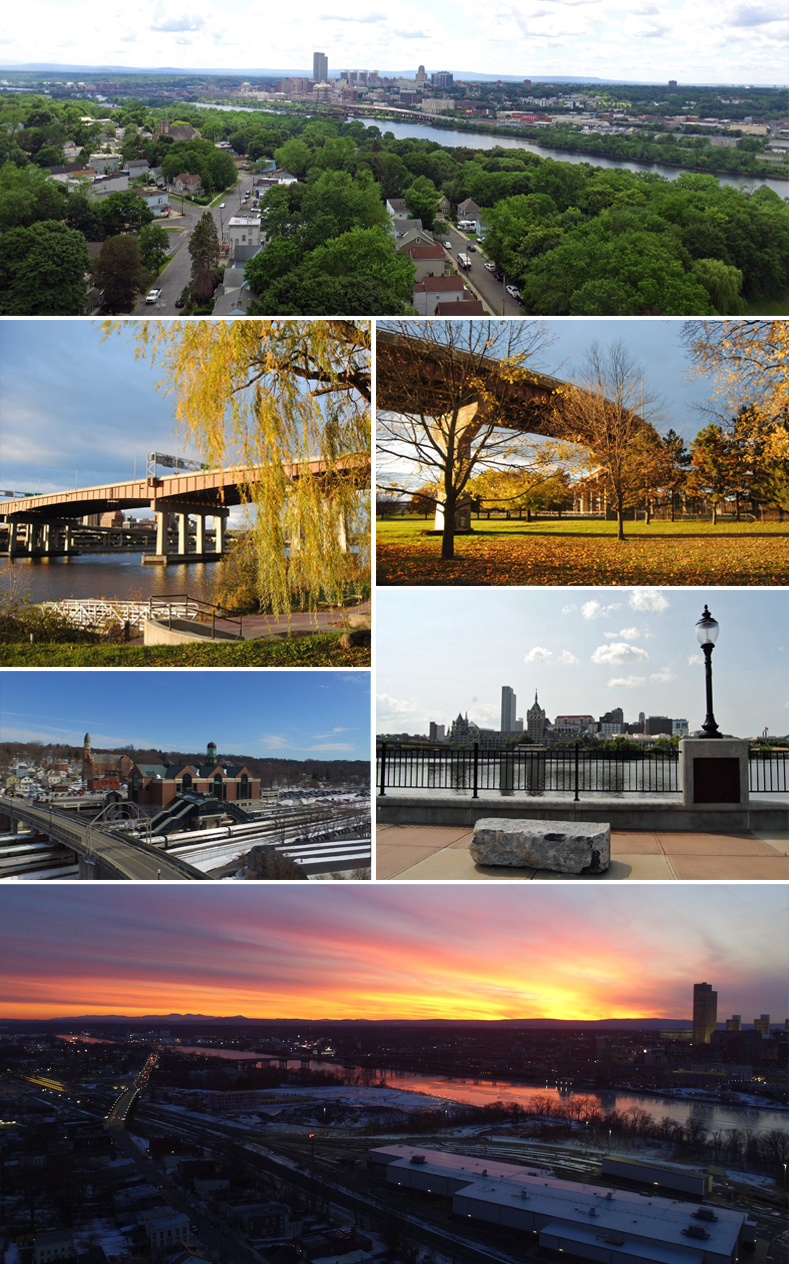
- Clockwise from top: Looking Southwest on Washington Ave. towards Albany; Riverfront Park boat dock; Fall foliage beneath the Dunn Memorial Bridge in Riverfront Park; CDTA Albany-Rensselaer Amtrak Station; Albany skyline from the Rensselaer esplanade at DeLaet's Landing; and the sun sets over Albany on a cold winter night.

- Seal
- Etymology: From Kiliaen van Rensselaer, patroon of the region
- Motto: The home of "Yankee Doodle"
- Boundaries of and major thoroughfares through Rensselaer

- Location in Rensselaer County and the state of New York.

- Location within New York (state) Location within the United States Location within North America
- Coordinates: 42°38′48″N 73°44′01″W
- Country: United States
- State: New York
- Region: Capital District
- County: Rensselaer
- Settled: 1630
- Incorporation: 1897

Government
  - Type: Mayor-council
  - Body: Common Council: President: Eric Endres (D); W1: Timothy Kitterman (D); W2: Stacy Hover (D); W3: Sara Beth Bollman (R); W4: Andrew Kretzschmar (R); W5: Diane Dwyer (D); W6: Anne Burton (D)
  - Mayor: John DeFrancesco (D)

Area
  - Total: 3.51 sq mi (9.10 km^{2})
  - Land: 3.18 sq mi (8.23 km^{2})
  - Water: 0.34 sq mi (0.87 km^{2})
- Elevation: 16 ft (4.9 m)
- Lowest elevation: 0 ft (0 m)

Population (2020)
  - Total: 9,210
  - Density: 2,897.5/sq mi (1,118.75/km^{2})
- Time zone: UTC-5 (EST)
  - Summer (DST): UTC-4 (EDT)
- ZIP Code: 12144
- Area codes: 518, 838
- FIPS code: 36-083-61148
- FIPS code: 36-61148
- GNIS feature ID: 0962384
- Wikimedia Commons: Rensselaer, New York
- Website: www.rensselaerny.gov

Rensselaer (/rɛnsəˈlɪər/), locally, (/ˈrɛnsələr/) is a city in Rensselaer County, New York, United States, and is located on the east side of the Hudson River, opposite Albany and on the western border of Rensselaer County. As of the 2020 census, the city population was 9,210.

The area now known as the City of Rensselaer was settled by the Dutch in the 17th century, who called it t'Greyn Bos, which became Greenbush in English. Rensselaer was an early center of the U.S. dye industry in the United States and home to the country's first aspirin factory. The city became a railroad hub in the 19th century; in 2020, Albany-Rensselaer was the ninth-busiest Amtrak station in the country and the second-busiest in New York State.

== History ==
Historical Affiliations

New Netherland 1609
Province of New York 1667
New York State 1776

=== Early settlement and growth ===
The natives of the area called it Petuquapoern and Juscum catick, and the Dutch claimed the land in 1609 based on Henry Hudson's exploration of the Hudson River on board the Dutch ship, Halve Maen. Later the area was called "De Laet's Burg" in honor of one of the directors of the Dutch West India Co. Settlement occurred at least as early as 1628. By 1642, there was a brewery and many farms, also a ferry was established by Hendrick Albertsen running from the mouth of Beaver Creek in Beverwyck (Albany) to the future Rensselaer. Greenbush (originally t'Greyn Bos in Dutch) was the earliest settlement from Dutch times. The hamlet of East Albany was part of the village of Greenbush. The second hamlet that was incorporated was Bath (also Bath-on-Hudson), which was laid out in 1795 and incorporated as a village prior to 1874.

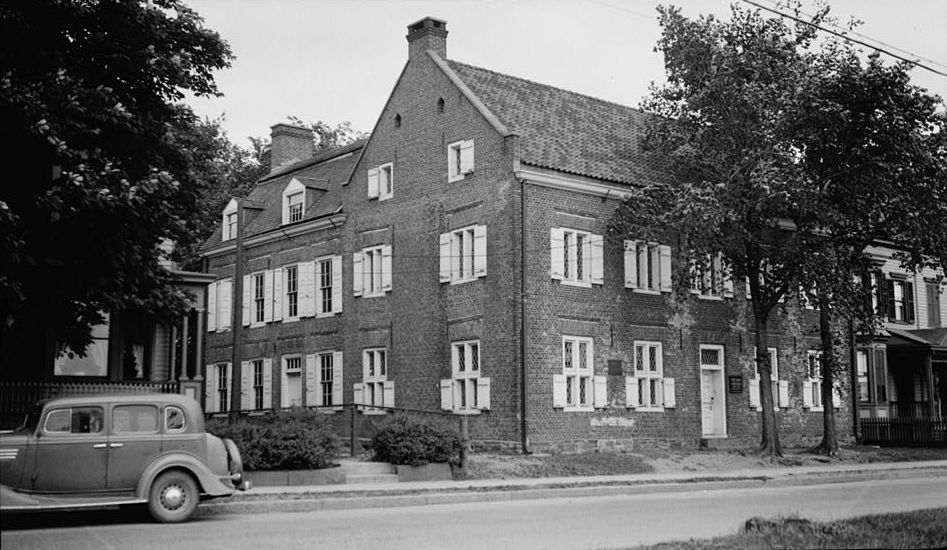
Fort Crailo in HABS photo, c. 1940

The Van Rensselaer family, who were the feudal landholders of the entire future Rensselaer County, built a residence in the future city of Rensselaer. This property was inherited by Hendrick van Rensselaer, Kiliaen van Rensselaer's grandson, who built Fort Crailo in approximately 1712. It was built on the site of where Dominie Megapolensis built his own house in 1642. Crailo was expanded in 1762–1768. At various times, the grounds were used as a campground for British and colonial troops. It is reportedly the place where, in 1755, British Army surgeon Richard Shuckburgh, quartered in the home, wrote the ditty "Yankee Doodle" to mock the colonial troops who fought with the British in the French and Indian Wars. Fort Crailo was declared a National Historic Landmark in 1961.

The hamlet of Greenbush was a tract of land about one square mile in size, and is that portion of the city between Partition and Mill Street. This was purchased in May 1810 by William Akin, Titus Goodman and John Dickinson from Stephen Van Rensselaer and Stephen N. Bayard, assignees of John J. Van Rensselaer. The village was later incorporated in 1815. A new charter was granted in 1828, which was amended in 1854, and again in 1863, and a new charter in 1871. In 1897, Greenbush was chartered as a city, and its name was changed to Rensselaer. Its limits were extended in 1902 by the annexation of the village of Bath and the western part of the town of East Greenbush.

=== Industrialization and modernization ===
In the 19th century, Rensselaer became the site of the Boston & Albany Railroad's (B&A) passenger depot, shops, freight houses, roundhouse, and coach yard. It was the site of transfers between trains of the New York Central Railroad and the B&A. A ferry transported people to and from the Van Rensselaer Island and downtown Albany at Maiden Lane. In 1871, the Maiden Lane Bridge was built replacing the ferry. In 1903, the channel that separated the island from the mainland was filled in with sand dredged from the bottom of the Hudson River. When the NY Central and the B&A merged in 1900 the island's activities became less important, though a new roundhouse and coach yard was built even as many buildings were demolished.

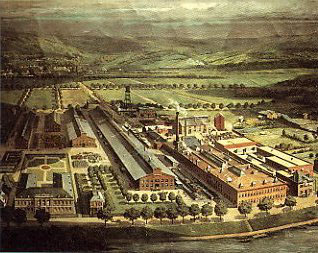
Hudson River Aniline and Color Works in the early 20th century

In 1881, the Hudson Riverfront Art Park in Rensselaer was the site of the first recorded major league Grand Slam in baseball history. In 1882, the Hudson River Aniline and Color Works built their first plant in Rensselaer (building 61), however it burned 13 years later. In 1895, Building 61 was rebuilt and at the same time Building 71 was built as well. It was acquired by the Bayer Corporation in 1903, which then built one of the largest and most up-to-date factories of its time in the US and the Rensselaer plant became the American home for the production of brand-name Aspirin. The US government seized the property in 1917 during World War I as enemy property, Bayer being a German company. It would later be owned by the General Aniline and Film Company, and then BASF. In 1927, it was the first plant to produce solid diazo salts in the United States. The plant went through 12 separate owners or subsidiaries in its lifetime, in the 1990s it was the oldest dye plant in continuous operation and also produced more dye than any other plant in the United States. According to a promotional brochure issued around 1993 by the BASF Corporation the Rensselaer plant was the largest North American dyestuffs production facility. The plant was shut down for good on December 28, 2000.

In 1932, next to the BASF plant, the Port of Albany-Rensselaer was built, mostly in neighboring Albany, but also with 35 acres (140,000 m^{2}) in the southern part of Rensselaer. The docks on the Rensselaer side were built in the 1970s.

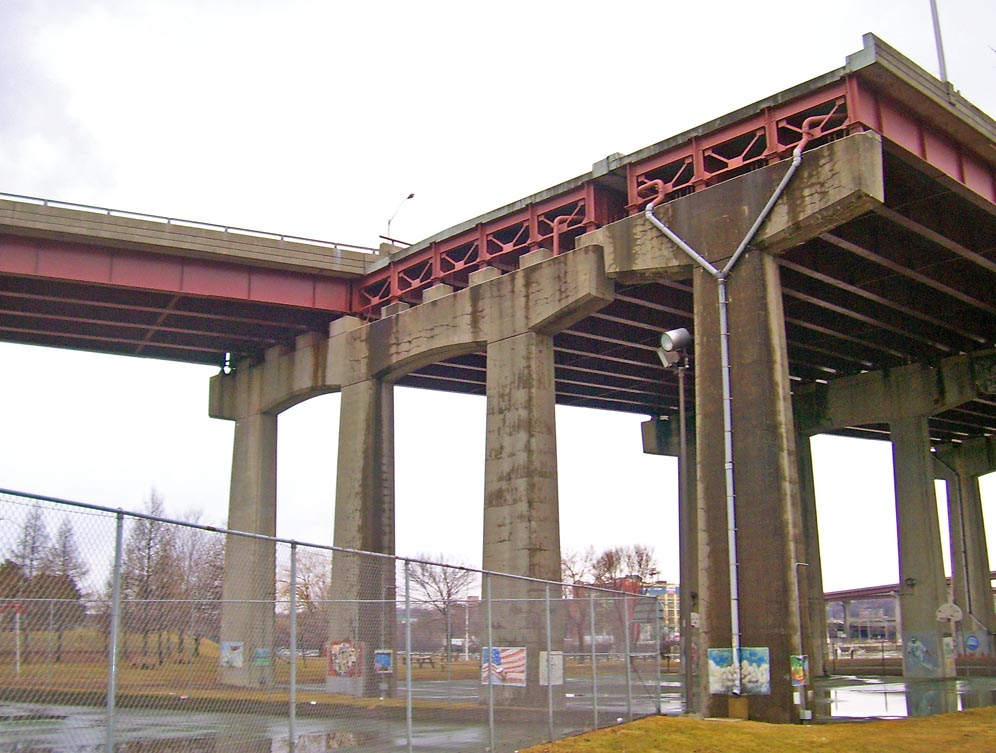
The stubs at the Dunn Memorial Bridge's Rensselaer end, built for the cancelled South Mall Expressway extension to Interstate 90

The 1960s were a major time of change for the city of Rensselaer. In 1967 the current Dunn Memorial Bridge was built between Albany and Rensselaer. Though the bridge was to continue east through Rensselaer, with the South Mall Arterial connecting with Interstate 90 at Exit 8, this extension never materialized. In 1968, the Amtrak station in Albany (Union Station) was relocated to Rensselaer; the Maiden Lane Bridge and all the railroad associated buildings were demolished when in 1969 the Rensselaer City School high/middle school campus was built north of Quackenderry Creek.

In the 2000s, another wave of development has been occurring in Rensselaer. In 2007, U.W. Marx Construction built a brand new campus for the Rensselaer City School District in the Northern section of the city in exchange for waterfront property that the Rensselaer Middle High School had occupied. The new school replaced the Rensselaer Middle High School and Van Rensselaer Elementary, formerly Van Rensselaer High. Doane Stuart occupies the former elementary school. The redevelopment of the waterfront property is named DeLaet's Landing in honor of Johan de Laet. The first $20 million, 96 unit apartment building opened in 2019. Construction began on a second luxury apartment building on the site in September 2021. The former Van Rensselaer High School was listed on the National Register of Historic Places in 2012.

In January 2023, final approvals were issued to advance the Barnet Mills Apartments redevelopment at the former site of Hilton Center. The project is an undertaking by BBL Construction to revitalize the property along the Hudson River that sits adjacent to the city boat launch and park. It was once home to Barnet Mills, producing wool products for many years. The buildings were last occupied for various artists and specialty businesses.

The City is also currently planning for the construction of a riverfront trail system that spans from the City's Boat Launch to the Hudson Riverfront Art Park over more than a mile of riverfront properties. The grant-funded trail will have multi-modal connections to the Livingston Avenue Bridge, which is a reconstruction project valued at over $400 million that has received state and federal funds.

== Library ==
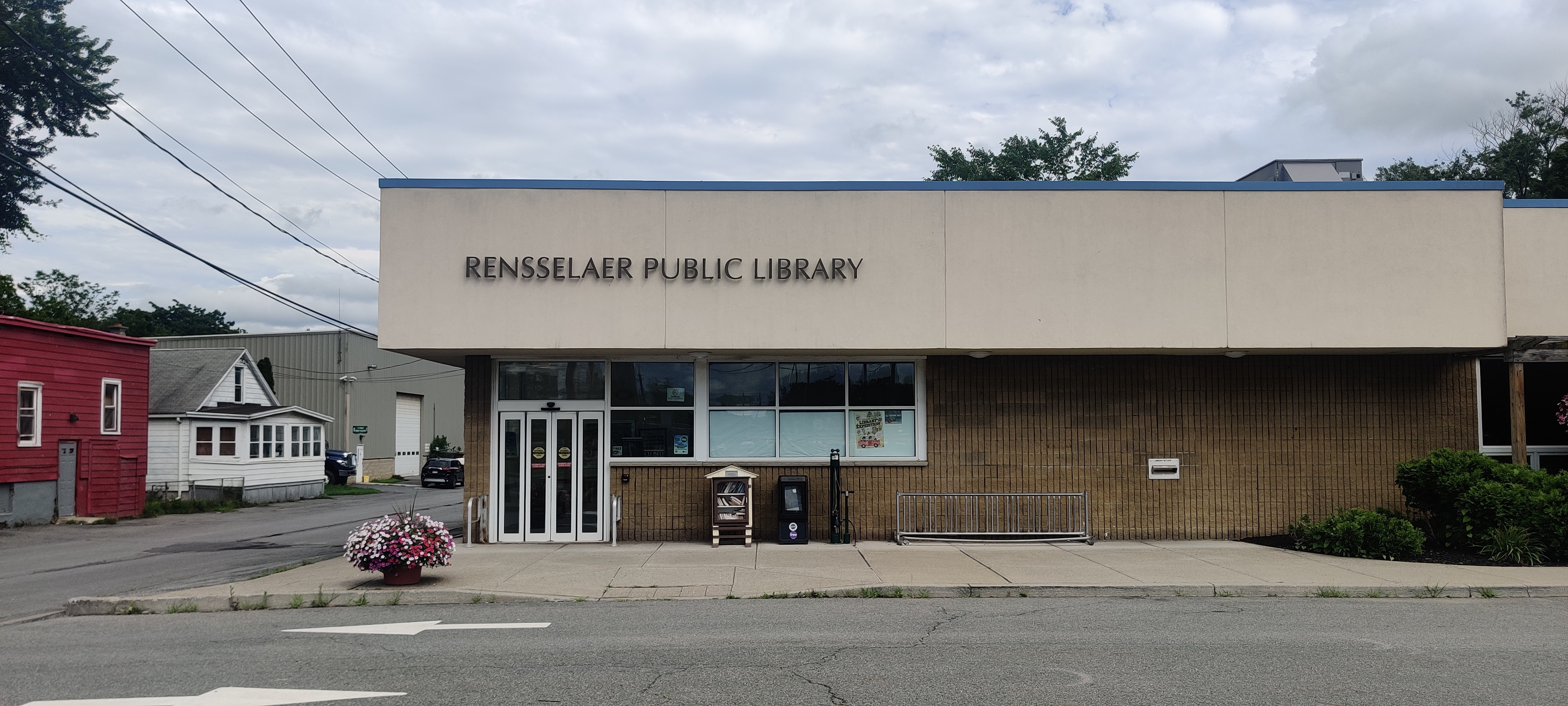
The Rensselaer Public Library, at its new location on East Street.

The Rensselaer Public Library is a member of the Upper Hudson Library System, a resource-sharing consortium consisting of twenty-nine public libraries in the counties of Albany and Rensselaer. In 2009, the library moved from Broadway to its current location on East Street.

== Geography ==
City of Rensselaer

According to the United States Census Bureau, the city has a total area of 3.3 square miles (8.5 km^{2}), of which 3.0 square miles (7.8 km^{2}) is land and 0.3 square miles (0.78 km^{2}) (9.61%) is water. The city is flat along the western and southern areas but the center and northern areas slope steeply to the east.

The city lies next to the Hudson River with Albany County and the city of Albany on the opposite shore. The town of North Greenbush borders the city to the north, and the town of East Greenbush is on the southern border; both towns border the city on the east, with the dividing line between the two towns meeting Rensselaer in the middle section of the city's eastern boundary. Rensselaer's southern border is even with the city of Albany's southern border; however, the northern border of Rensselaer is slightly south of Albany's corresponding northern border.

== Cityscape ==
=== Neighborhoods ===
Northern Rensselaer Hills

- Eastland Park
- The Mansions
- Sterling Ridge

Eastern Rensselaer Hills

- East Street Neighborhood

Western Rensselaer Hills

- 1st Street Neighborhood
- 2nd Street Neighborhood
- 3rd Street Neighborhood
- Washington Avenue Neighborhood
- Broadway Neighborhood

Southern Development Plain

- Downtown Development District

Hudson River Shoreline

=== Parks and recreation ===
Coyne Field

Huyck Memorial Park

Hudson Riverfront Art Park

Waterfront Esplanade at DeLeaet's Landing

Plum Street Park

Walter S. Pratt Memorial Playground (Sprinkler Park)

Hollow Park

First Street Park

Tracy Street Park

Hilton Park Boat Launch

8th Street Park

Eastland Park

Valley View Playground

== Demographics ==
Historical population
Census	Pop.	Note	%±
1880	3,295		—
1890	7,301		121.6%
1900	7,466		2.3%
1910	10,711		43.5%
1920	10,823		1.0%
1930	11,233		3.8%
1940	10,768		−4.1%
1950	10,856		0.8%
1960	10,506		−3.2%
1970	10,136		−3.5%
1980	9,047		−10.7%
1990	8,255		−8.8%
2000	7,761		−6.0%
2010	9,392		21.0%
2020	9,210		−1.9%
U.S. Decennial Census

As of the census of 2010, there were 9,392 people, 4,124 households, and 2,457 families residing in the city. The population density was 2,579.2 inhabitants per square mile (995.8/km^{2}). There were 3,713 housing units at an average density of 1,233.9 per square mile (476.4/km^{2}). The racial makeup of the city was 82.11% White, 12.06% African American, 0.20% Native American, 2.17% Asian, 0.01% Pacific Islander, and 3.02% from two or more races. Hispanic or Latino of any race were 4.72% of the population.

There were 3,397 households, out of which 28.6% had children under the age of 18 living with them, 35.2% were married couples living together, 16.4% had a female householder with no husband present, and 42.7% were non-families. 36.1% of all households were made up of individuals, and 12.9% had someone living alone who was 65 years of age or older. The average household size was 2.28 and the average family size was 2.98.

In the city, the population was spread out, with 25.0% under the age of 18, 8.1% from 18 to 24, 31.3% from 25 to 44, 21.7% from 45 to 64, and 13.9% who were 65 years of age or older. The median age was 36 years. For every 100 females, there were 90.8 males. For every 100 females age 18 and over, there were 86.8 males.

The median income for a household in the city was $34,730, and the median income for a family was $40,688. Males had a median income of $29,685 versus $26,291 for females. The per capita income for the city was $19,674. About 9.8% of families and 12.8% of the population were below the poverty line, including 19.0% of those under age 18 and 9.0% of those age 65 or over.

== Education ==
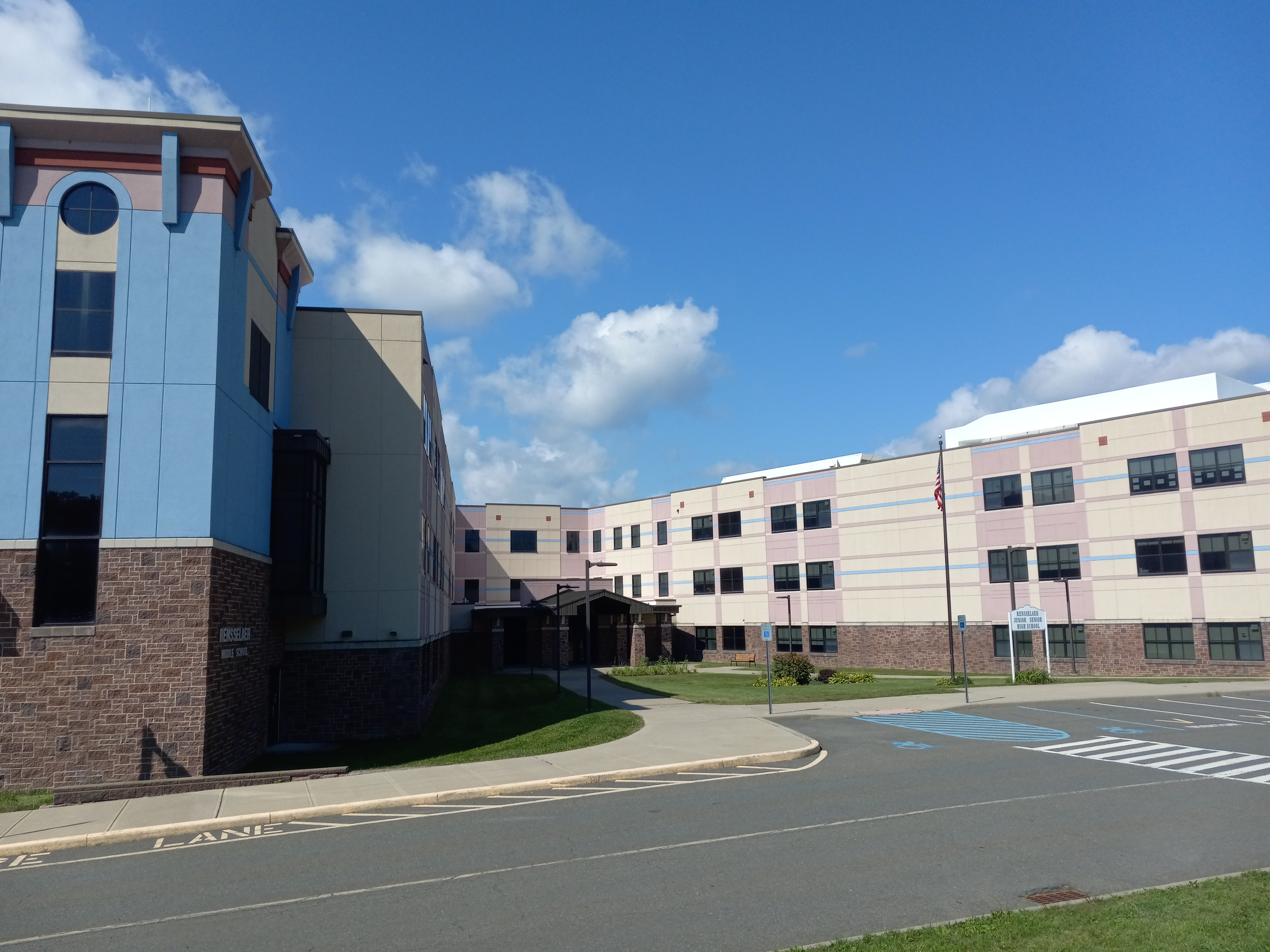
Rensselaer City School District campus

The Rensselaer City School District operates the city's public school system which consists of a single campus comprising an elementary, middle and high school. Doane Stuart is the only private school in the city. On September 16, 2009, Doane Stuart opened an interfaith campus at 199 Washington Ave. The campus which houses students in Kindergarten through 12th grade is the former location of Van Rensselaer Elementary school.

== Transportation ==
=== Roads ===
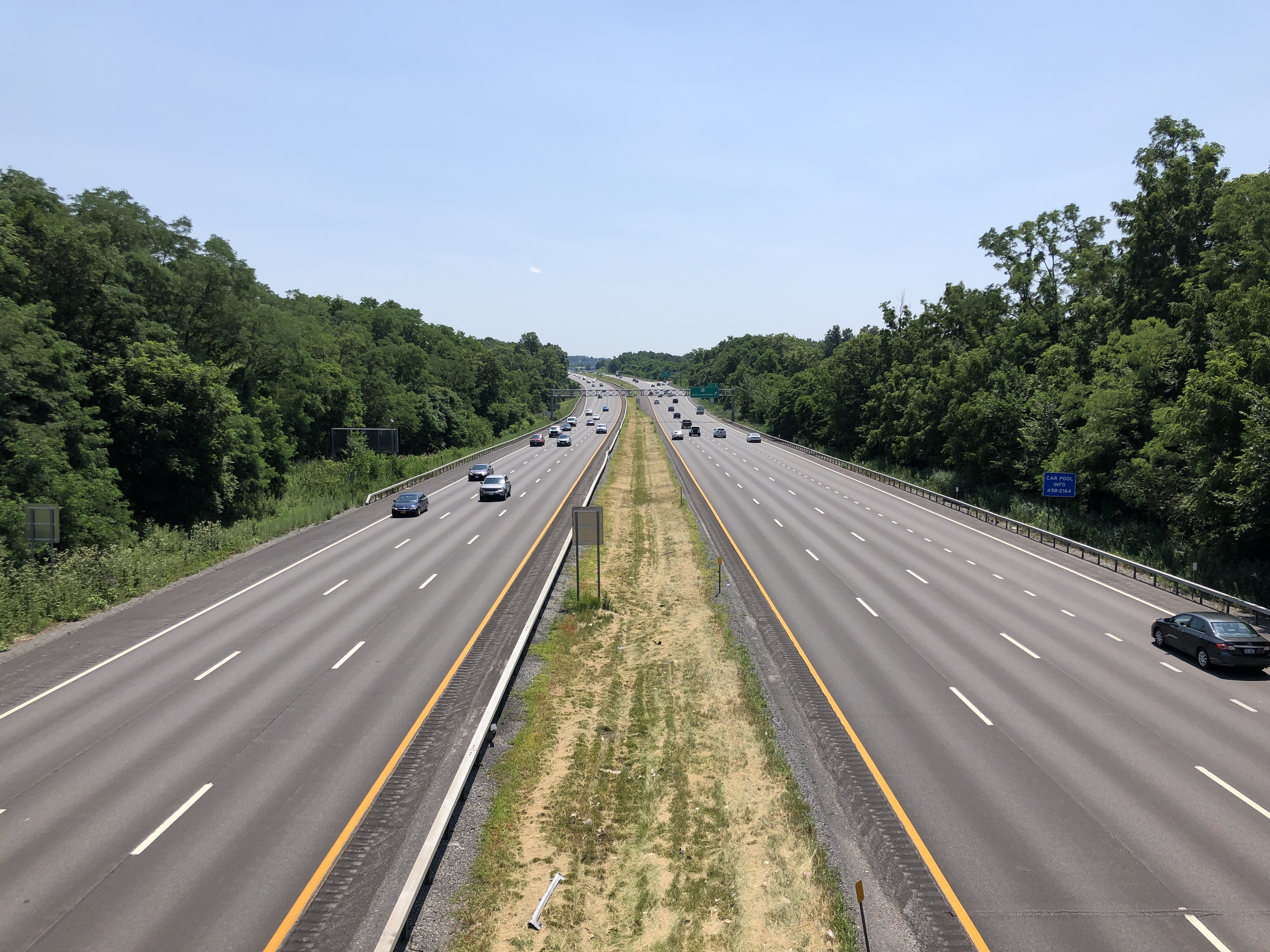
I-90 in Rensselaer

Interstate 90 (I-90), a trans-continental Interstate Highway running from Seattle to Boston, is the most prominent highway serving Rensselaer, passing across the northern fringe of the city. I-90 crosses the Hudson River on the Patroon Island Bridge, providing a local connection to Albany. Other prominent highways serving the city include U.S. Route 9 and U.S. Route 20.

=== Rail ===
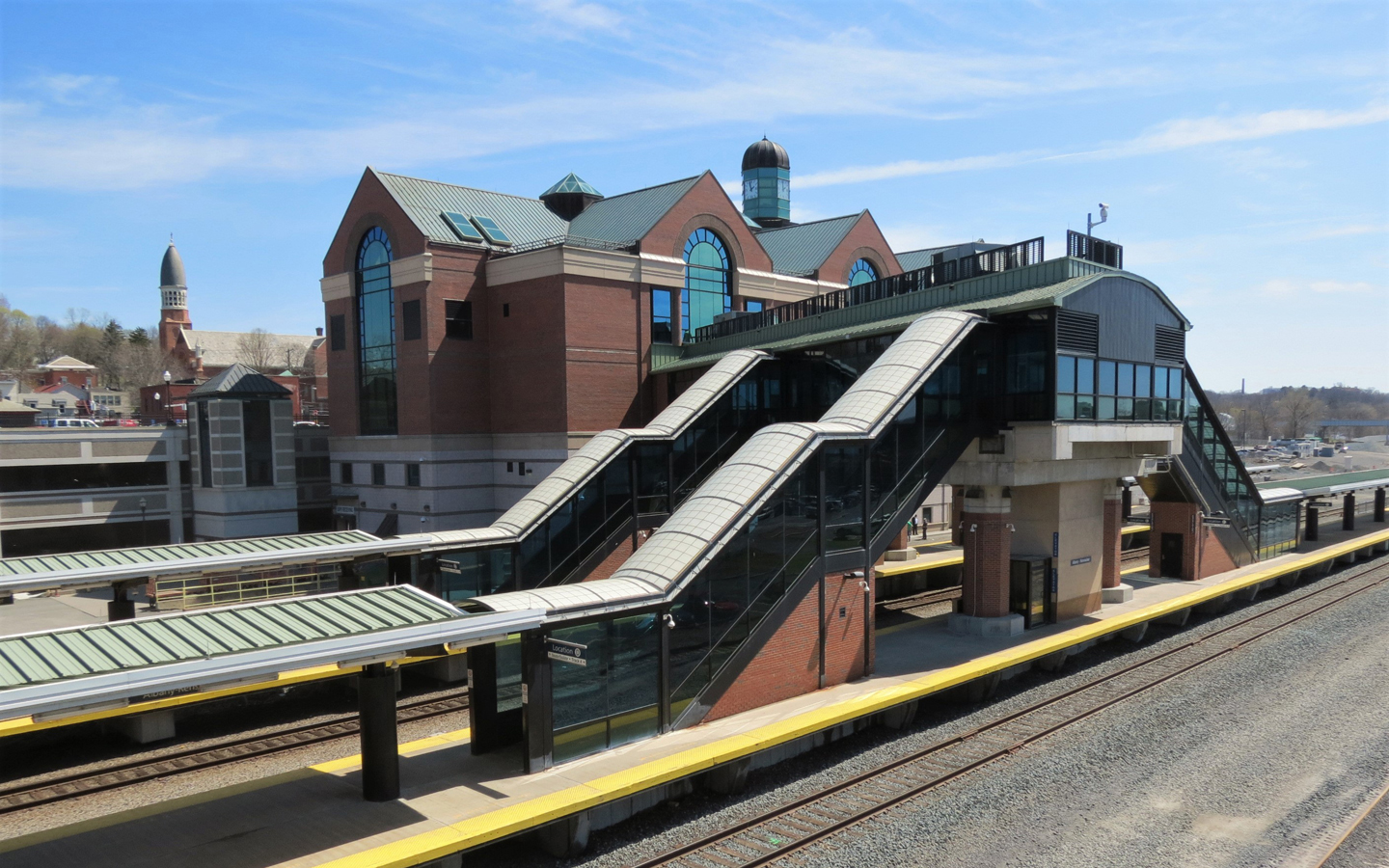
Albany-Rensselaer Amtrak Station.

The Albany-Rensselaer Amtrak station is the primary passenger rail station for the Rensselaer, Albany and Troy area. Six Empire Service trains run from Albany-Rensselaer to New York City on weekday mornings and several depart for New York in the evening, returning and terminating at Albany-Rensselaer in the afternoon and late evening. The Ethan Allen, a train supported by Vermont and New York, runs north from New York City through Rensselaer to Burlington, Vermont. The Adirondack runs from New York City through Rensselaer to Montreal. Two Empire Service trains run through Rensselaer to Buffalo and Niagara Falls. The Maple Leaf runs from New York City through Rensselaer to Buffalo and Toronto.

As of 2020 it was Amtrak's ninth-busiest station, as well as the busiest to serve a metro area with a population smaller than 2 million– a distinction it has held since at least 2010. This is primarily due to the large number of passengers who commute to and from New York City. The station is the second busiest in New York State behind Pennsylvania Station (New York City).

One section of Amtrak's Lake Shore Limited long-distance train originates in New York City and one section originates in Boston. The two sections are joined at Albany-Rensselaer and travel on to Chicago as a single train. The eastbound Lake Shore Limited reverses the process and splits at Albany-Rensselaer into two sections, with one section continuing south to New York City and the other continuing east to Boston.

== Electric power facilities ==
=== Independent system operator ===
Although not technically located within the bounds of the city, the New York Independent System Operator's (NYISO) headquarters shares the same zip code. The NYISO, formerly the New York Power Pool, operates and balances energy flows on the state's electric transmission system, administers the electric wholesale market in New York, and develops wholesale market policy with the assistance of stakeholders.

=== Empire Generating Co ===
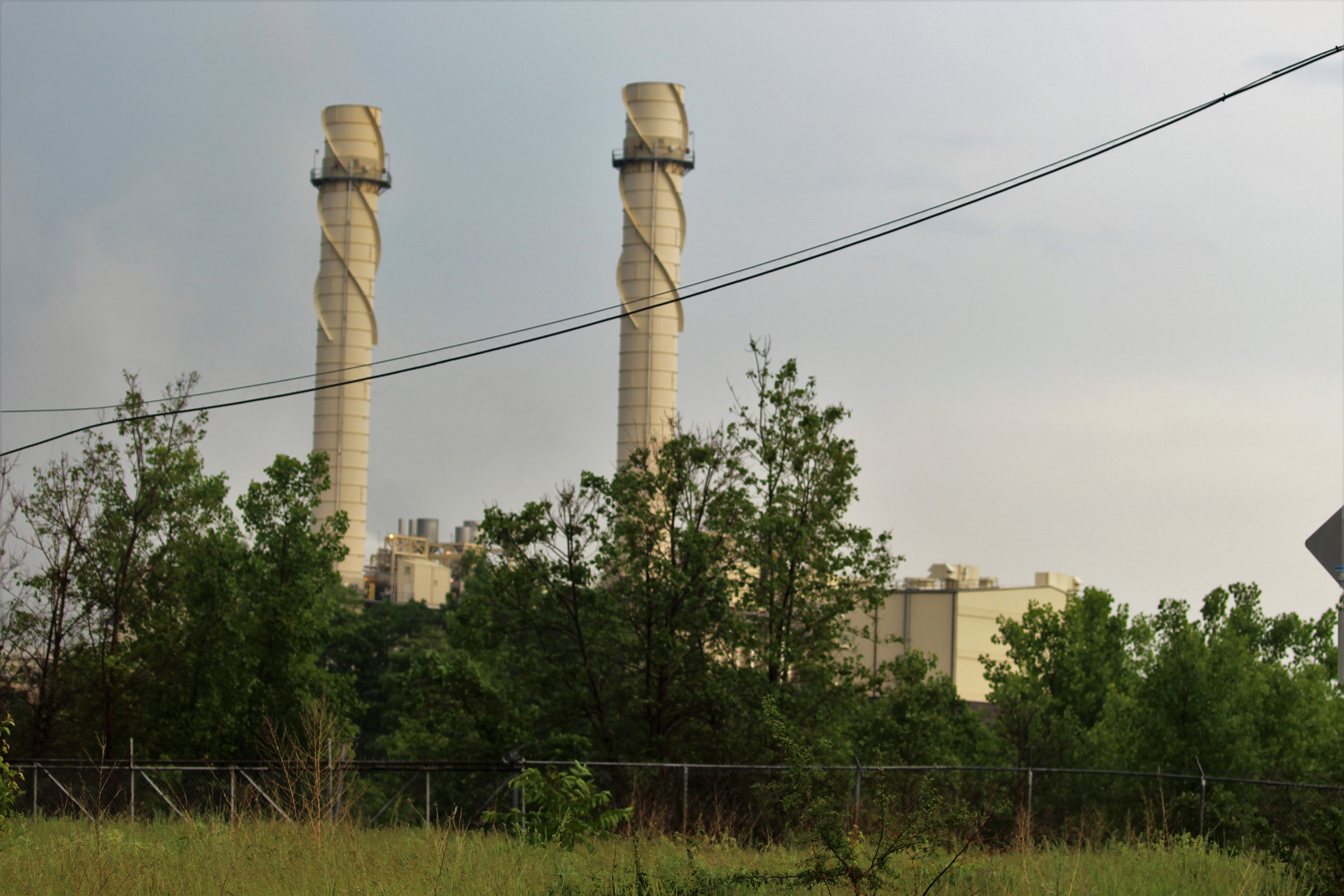
A power plant on American Oil Road in the city of Rensselaer, New York, captured May 26, 2021.

Pursuant to Article X of the Public Service Law, BesiCorp-Empire Development Company LLC. (now operating as Empire Generating Co, LLC) was granted a Certificate of Environmental Compatibility and Public Need for a 505-megawatt (MW) combined cycle cogeneration plant in 2004. After additional filings, the project became a 670-MW (nameplate) combined cycle natural gas powered plant that went into service in September 2010. There are two combustion turbines whose exhaust creates steam to drive a steam turbine. All of the turbines are manufactured by General Electric. It uses an air-cooled condenser to reduce water draw. It is located on an 88-acre former industrial area that was owned by BASF Corporation between Riverside Avenue and the Hudson River on the west, and the Port Access Highway on the east and south. In 2017, it injected 2,357 GWh of electric energy into the electric transmission system. This is equivalent to operating at full capacity for approximately 40.9% of the year. For comparison, the capital region consumed 11,823 GWh of electric energy in 2017. Its power is sold into the electric wholesale market administered by the NYISO.

A greenway/bikeway path was included in the final plan and was built near the plant. A decommission fund was established in the original order in the amount of $7 million at start of commercial operation. The company argued for a reduction in 2013 based upon overlooked metal salvage values, but the reduction was not granted, nor was an increase in the security amount a month later. In 2017, a 26-ton fan from the air cooled condenser fell on a worker and killed him during routine maintenance. In its 2018-2019 adopted budget, the City of Rensselaer notes a revenue of about $1.1 million from payments in lieu of taxes most of which can be assumed to come from Empire Genering LLC. For comparison, the City of Rensselaer notes a total budget of about $15 million for 2018–2019.

== Government ==
Rensselaer has a mayor-council form of government. The mayor, who is elected every four years, heads the executive branch of city government.

Michael E. Stammel won the mayoral election in November 2019, defeating incumbent Richard Mooney. He was re-elected to a four-year term as mayor on November 2, 2021, after a re-challenge by Richard Mooney.

Rensselaer is in the 20th Congressional district, represented by Paul Tonko (D) in the United States House of Representatives. The city is represented by Chuck Schumer (D) and Kirsten Gillibrand (D) in the United States Senate. On the state level, the city is in the 44th district in the New York Senate, represented by Neil Breslin (D). In the New York Assembly, Rensselaer is in the 108th district, represented by John T. McDonald III (D).
