= Joseph Pivato =

Canadian writer and academic (born 1946)

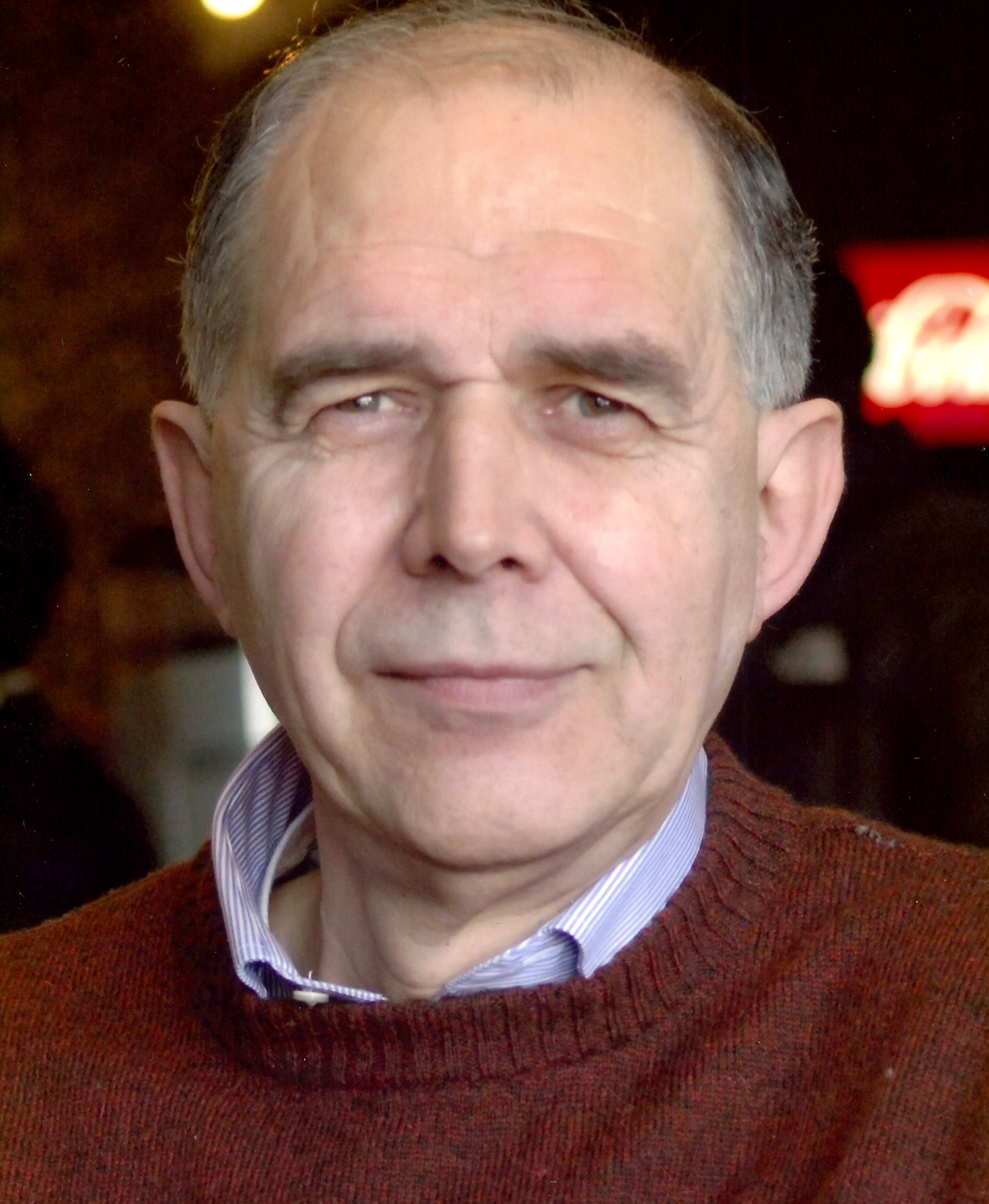
Joseph Pivato in Edmonton 2018

Joseph Pivato (born February 1946, in Tezze sul Brenta, Italy) is a Canadian writer and academic who first established the critical recognition of Italian-Canadian literature and changed perceptions of Canadian writing. From 1977 to 2015 he was professor of Comparative Literature at Athabasca University, Canada. He is now Professor Emeritus.

== Biography ==
He was born Giuseppe Pivato in Tezze sul Brenta (Stroppari), a town about 40 km north of Venice, Italy. His mother was from Udine in the Friuli region east of Venice. This Italian origin was to have a profound influence on his whole life and career as a writer, researcher and academic. The family emigrated to Toronto, Ontario, Canada, in 1952 where the Catholic nuns changed his name to Joseph. He attended St. Michael's College School, an academic high school for boys, where he studied languages and literature. He enrolled at York University where he studied with modernist scholar, D.E.S. Maxwell, feminist and medievalist, Beryl Rowland, feminist scholar, Johanna H. Stuckey, Canadian writer, Irving Layton, met French poet Hedi Bouraoui and poet-critic, Eli Mandel. With D.E.S. Maxwell he enrolled in the first course in African Literature (1969). In the summers he worked with Italian bricklayers to help pay for his university fees. In 1968 he founded and edited the first literary magazine at York, Voodoo Poetry at Vanier College. In 1970 he earned a B.A. (Combined Honours, English and French) from York and moved to Edmonton to study Comparative Literature at the University of Alberta. His 1971 M.A. thesis was on Dante and Baudelaire. Writer and academic E.D. Blodgett was his advisor for his Ph.D. thesis on hermetic poetry. He also met Canadian writers Henry Kreisel and Sheila Watson and began to work on Canadian authors publishing his first critical essay in Canadian Literature (1973, editor George Woodcock) while he was still a graduate student. At the end of his doctoral program (1977) he began to work at Athabasca University, a distance education institution modeled after the British Open University. At Athabasca he helped to develop the first courses in English literature, Canadian Literature, Comparative Literature and Theory. He was founding president of the Association of Italian-Canadian Writers (1986) which advances the work of these ethnic minority authors through critical publications, biennial conferences and book launches. At Athabasca Pivato was Chair of the Centre for Language and Literature and developed the first courses in creative writing. Between 1997 and 2005 he pioneered Online courses at Athabasca by producing the first webpages for courses in English Literature, Canadian Literature, Comparative Literature and Theory. In 2010 he was founding professor of the new M.A. in Literary Studies which is part of the MA-IS program. He is married to Alberta psychologist, writer, academic and disabilities advocate Dr. Emma Pivato. Their children include (1) Dr. Marcus J. Pivato, Prof. of Economics, Université Paris 1, Pantheon Sorbonne. (2) Julian A M. Pivato, Artist and Academic in Toronto and (3) Alexis who has disabilities and lives at home. They have 4 grandchildren. Emma Pivato's novels include Blind Sight Solution (Chicago: Cozy Cat Press, 2013) The Crooked Knife (2014) Roscoe's Revenge (2014) Jessie Knows (2015) Murder on Highway 2 (2016) Deadly Care (2016) Healthy Bodies Also Die (2019) and Postpartum Dead (2021). In 2021 Emma Pivato published And along came Alexis a powerful memoir of life with a severely disabled daughter (Guernica Editions). In 2026 Joseph Pivato published Abandoned: Forgotten Stories of Love and War inspired by the lives of his Pivato and Sabucco family members.

== Scholarly work in Comparative Literature ==
Joseph Pivato promotes Italian-Canadian writing by using the theories of Comparative Literature. As a literature which exists in three languages: English, French and Italian, it lends itself to discussions on translation, influences, ethnic identity, migration and appropriation. His discovery began in 1978 when his poems were included in Roman Candles, the first anthology of Italian-Canadian poets edited by Pier Giorgio DiCicco. This inspired him to present the first paper on Italian-Canadian writers at a national conference at Dalhousie University, Halifax in May, 1981. This paper was rejected by several journals and was eventually published as "The Arrival of Italian-Canadian Writing," in Canadian Ethnic Studies 14,1 (1982).

In 1984 Pivato was research fellow in the Ethnic and Immigration Studies Program at the University of Toronto. This fellowship was at the invitation of Prof. Robert F. Harney, Academic Director (1976–89) of the Multicultual History Society of Ontario at U.of T. In Toronto he edited his first book, Contrasts: Comparative Essays on Italian-Canadian Writing (1985) which became a seminal volume for the promotion of ethnic minority literature in Canada. He conceived and co-edited the "Italian-Canadian Connections" issue of Canadian Literature 106 (1985). Pivato spent the year 1987-88 at York University in the Mariano Elia Chair in Italian-Canadian Studies where he developed and taught the first course on Italian-Canadian writers. The Research Institute for Comparative Literature in Edmonton invited him to edit Literatures of Lesser Diffusion (1990), the first collection of studies of writing by 20 different ethnic groups in Canada. In 1991 he was Canadian Visiting Fellow at Macquarie University in Sydney, Australia. This sojourn resulted in the publication of Echo: Essays on Other Literatures (1994), a collection of original critical studies on Comparative Literature and minority writing, translation, oral influences on writing, ethnic women writers, and other topics. The critical foreword is by feminist scholar, Sneja Gunew (Deakin & U.B.C.). He returned to Canadian Ethnic Studies in 1996 by editing a special issue on "Literary Theory and Ethnic Minority Writing." The major volume Pivato edited was The Anthology of Italian-Canadian Writing (1998) which included 53 authors working in English, French or Italian and which has been used as a text in many college and university courses. Among the authors included are F.G. Paci, Linda Hutcheon, Nino Ricci, Pasquale Verdicchio, Mary di Michele, and Marco Micone. Pivato's poetry has appeared in Poetry Canada Review, Seven Persons Repository, Manna, Canadian Ethnic Studies," and his short fiction in Threshold (1999) and Passages (2002).

Pivato was in the forefront of research and advocacy for a multicultural view of Canadian literature. Writer and academic George Elliott Clarke points to his work as an example that other ethnic minority writers should follow in establishing a distinct identity for their publications. Pivato has been a visiting speaker and researcher at the University of Udine several times and at their Centro di Cultura Canadese founded by Prof. Anna Pia De Luca. He focused some of his research on Canadian writers with backgrounds in Friuli. In 2004 he was visiting fellow at the University of Wollongong, Australia, where he collaborated with Prof. Gaetano Rando. Over the years Pivato has been an invited speaker at the University of Calgary, the University of Toronto, The University of Montreal, Laurentian University, the California State University, Long Beach, the University of Warwick, U.K. the University of Venice, the University of Melbourne and other institutions.

From 2000 to 2011 he was general editor of the Essential Writers Series with Antonio D’Alfonso at Guernica Editions (Toronto and Montreal). He is now sole Academic Editor of this Writers Series. By 2022 the series had reached an impressive 56 volumes, each a monograph on a Canadian author including: Sheila Watson, Sharon Pollock, Caterina Edwards, Aritha Van Herk, Gail Scott, Robert Kroetsch, David Adams Richards, Nicole Brossard, Margaret Atwood, Anne Hébert, Gary Geddes, Joy Kogawa, Mary di Michele, Dany Laferriere, Roy Kiyooka and Jack Hodgins. Each is edited by a prominent academic such as Lianne Moyes, Anne Nothof, Louise H. Forsyth, Monique Tschofen, Christl Verduyn, Nicole Markotic and Sheena L. Wilson. In 2008 he first identified the Sherbrooke School of Comparative Canadian Literature as instrumental in the development and study of Canadian writing in English, French and translations, and later published this new proposal in 2011. He edited the critical anthology, Africadian Atlantic: Essays on George Elliott Clarke (2012), the first book devoted to this important African-Canadian author. He edited, Sheila Watson: Essays on Her Works (2015), the first book to examine all of Watson's work as a writer, editor and mentor. In 2018 Pivato co-edited with Giulia De Gasperi Comparative Literature for the New Century the first Canadian text in Comparative Literature. It promotes the field from a pluralistic approach with the study of different languages and literatures. Most of the 20 contributors are bilingual Canadian academics.

At the Athabasca University site AUSPACE for faculty research Pivato has posted 21 of his recently published essays in Comparative Literature. Joseph Pivato created and maintains the Canadian Writers site at Athabasca University, an extensive research site on the authors of Canada. On Research Gate he has also posted more than 20 academic essays.

== AWARDS ==
1987-88 The Mariano Elia Chair in Italian-Canadian Studies, York University, Toronto.

1991 Canadian Visiting Fellowship, Macquarie University, Sydney, Australia.

2026 The Librissimi Lifetime Achievement Award, Toronto Book Festival.

== Bibliography ==
=== Books on literary studies ===
- Contrasts: Comparative Essays on Italian-Canadian Writing. Montreal: Guernica, 1985. Editor and contributor. Winner of Bressani Prize for multicultural literature for 1985.
- Literatures of Lesser Diffusion / Les littératures de moindre diffusion. Edmonton: Research Institute for Comparative Literature, 1990. Editor in collaboration with Steven Totosy and Milan Dimic.
- Echo: Essays on Other Literatures. Toronto: Guernica Editions, 1994. Author with foreword by Sneja Gunew.
- The Anthology of Italian-Canadian Writing. Toronto: Guernica, 1998, Editor.
- Caterina Edwards: Essays on Her Works. Toronto: Guernica, 2000. Editor
- F.G. Paci: Essays on His Works. Toronto: Guernica, 2003. Editor.
- Mary di Michele: Essays on Her Works. Toronto: Guernica, 2007. Editor and contributor.
- Pier Giorgio DiCicco: Essays on His Works. Toronto: Guernica, 2011. Editor and contributor.
- Africadian Atlantic: Essays on George Elliott Clarke. Toronto: Guernica, 2012. Editor and contributor.
- Sheila Watson: Essays on Her Works. Toronto: Guernica, 2015. Editor and contributor.
- From Friuli: Poems in Friulan with English Translations. Rina Del Nin Cralli. Montreal: Longbridge Books, 2015. Editor and contributor.
- Comparative Literature for the New Century co-edited with Giulia De Gasperi. Montreal: McGill-Queen's UP, 2018. Editor and contributor.

---

=== Fiction ===
- Abandoned: Forgotten Stories of Love and War. Toronto: Guernica Editions, 2026.

---

- SPECIAL EDITIONS of Journals edited by Joseph Pivato
- Canadian Literature 106, "Italian-Canadian Connections" (1985), Co-editor.
- Canadian Ethnic Studies 28,3 (1996) "Literary Theory and Ethnic Minority Writing."
- The Toronto Review of Contemporary Writing Abroad 16,3 (1998) "Italian-Canadian Issue."
- Accenti: The Magazine with an Italian Accent 29 (2013) "Special Issue on Italian Music."

=== Contributions to books (selected list) ===
- The Mountain Man of Letters: Essays on the Works of Howard O'Hagan. ed. Sergiy Takovenko. Guernica Editions, 2024.
- Land Deep in Time: Canadian Historiographic Ethnofiction. eds. Weronika Suchacka & H. Lutz. Gottingen: Brill, V&R Unipress, 2023.
- Comparative Literatures: Aspects, Method, and Orientation. eds. Alison Boulanger & Fiona McIntosh-Varjabedian. Stuttgart: Ibidem-Verlag, 2022.
- Comparative Literature in Canada: Contemporary Scholarship, Pedagogy, and Publishing in Review. eds. Susan Ingram & Irene Sywenky. Lanham: Lexington Books, 2020.
- Writing Alberta: Building on a Literary Identity. eds. George Melnyk & Donna Coates. Calgary: University of Calgary Press, 2017.
- Translation Effects: Shaping Modern Canadian Culture. eds. Kathy Mezei, Sherry Simon & Luise von Flotow. Montreal: McGill-Queen's University Press. 2014.
- Transformations of the Canadian Cultural Mosaic, eds. Anna Pia De Luca & Deborah Saidero. Udine: Forum, 2012.
- Veneti in Canada, ed. Gianpaolo Romanato. Ravenna, Italy: Longo Editore, 2011.
- Reflections on Culture, eds Licia Canton, Venera Fazio, Jim Zucchero. Toronto: Frank Iacobucci Centre for Italian-Canadian Studies, 2010.
- Faith and Fantasy in the Renaissance, eds Olga Zorzi Pugliese & Ethan Matt Kavaler. Toronto: Centre for Reformation & Renaissance Studies, 2009
- Investigating Canadian Identities, ed. Anna Pia De Luca. Udine: Forum, 2010.
- Literary Pluralities, ed. Christl Verduyn. Peterborough: Broadview Press, 1998.
- Floating the Borders: New Contexts in Canadian Criticism, ed. Nurjehan Aziz. Toronto: TSAR, 1999.
- Shaping History: L’Identita Italo-Canadese nel Canada Anglofono, eds Anna Pia De Luca & Alessanda Ferraro. Udine: Forum, 2005.
- Social Pluralism and Literary History, ed. Francesco Loriggio. Toronto: Guernica, 1996.
