= Pasquale Verdicchio =

Italian Canadian poet, critic and translator (born 1954)

Pasquale Verdicchio (born March 4, 1954) is an Italian Canadian poet, critic and translator teaching in the US at UCSD. Born in Naples, Italy, he moved to Vancouver BC in the late 60s. He completed a BA at University of Victoria, an MA at the University of Alberta, and PhD at the UCLA. In the departments of Italian and Comparative Literature, he teaches Italian language, film and literature, and creative writing.

Pasquale Verdicchio was a founding member of the Association of Italian-Canadian Writers (1986). Other founders include Antonio D'Alfonso, Pier Giorgio Di Cicco, Dino Minni, Fulvio Caccia, Marco Micone and Joseph Pivato. Verdicchio was president of AICW from 1994-98 and again from 2006-8. In 2020 Antonio D'Alfonso edited, Pasquale Verdicchio: Essays on His Works a collection of literary studies on the many books of poetry and criticism which Verdicchio produced in his long career.

== Publications ==
=== Poetry ===
- Moving Landscape. Montreal, QC: Guernica, 1985.
- Ipsissima Verba. Los Angeles, CA: Parentheses, 1986.
- A Critical Geography. San Diego, CA: Parentheses Writing Series, 1989.
- Nomadic Trajectory. Montreal, QC: Guernica Editions, 1990.
- Isthmus. Los Angeles, CA: Littoral Editions, 1991.
- The Posthumous Poet: a suite for Pier Paolo Pasolini. Los Angeles CA: Jahbone Press, 1993.
- Approaches to Absence. Toronto, ON: Guernica Editions, 1994.
- The House is Past: Poems 1978-1998. Toronto, ON: Guernica Editions, 2000.
- La nave del mondo. Porto dei Santi, Bologna: 2000.
- Le Paysage qui bouge. By Pasquale Verdicchio. Translated and selected by Antonio D'Alfonso. Montreal, QC: Éditions du Noiroît, 2000.
- This Nothing’s Place. Montreal, QC: Guernica Editions, 2008.
- Only You, Victoria, BC: Ekstasis, 2021.
- Contentment, Victoria, BC: Ekstasis, 2024.

=== Non-fiction ===
- Devils in Paradise: Writings on Post-emigrant Cultures. Toronto, ON: Guernica, 1997.
- Bound by Distance: Rethinking Nationalism Through the Italian Diaspora. Madison: Fairleigh Dickinson University Press, 1997.
- Duologue: On Culture and Identity. By Antonio D'Alfonso and Pasquale Verdicchio. Toronto, ON: Guernica Editions, 1998.
- Looters, photographers, and thieves: aspects of Italian photographic culture in the nineteenth and twentieth centuries. Lanham, MD: Fairleigh Dickinson University Press, 2011.
- Encounters with the real in contemporary Italian literature and cinema. Loredana Di Martino and Pasquale Verdicchio, eds. Newcastle upon Tyne: Cambridge Scholars Publishing, 2017.
- Ecocritical Approaches to Italian Culture and Literature: The Denatured Wild. Lanham, MD: Lexington Books, 2016.

=== Translations ===
- “Tok”. By Gabriele Belletti. Pasquale Verdicchio, trans. Italy: Edizioni Zest Sostenibili, 2023.
- The Golden Man. By Vivian Lamarque. Pasquale Verdicchio, trans. Victoria, BC: Ekstasis, 2017.
- Fosfeni. By Andrea Zanzotto. Pasquale Verdicchio, trans. Toronto, ON: Guernica Editions, 2010.
- Dark Man. By Robert Pace. Pasquale Verdicchio, trans. Toronto, ON: Guernica Editions, 2005.
- Women and Lovers. By Maria Ardizzi. Pasquale Verdicchio, trans. Toronto, ON: Guernica Editions, 2000.
- The Wall of the Earth. By Giorgio Caproni. Pasquale Verdicchio, trans. Montreal, QC: Guernica, 1992.
- Futurism and Advertising. By Fortunato Depero. Pasquale Verdicchio, trans. San Diego, CA: Parentheses Writing Series, 1990.
- The Southern Question. By Antonio Gramsci. Pasquale Verdicchio, trans. Chicago, IL: Bordighera, 1995.
- Cosmogony of an Event. By Francesco Mangone. Pasquale Verdicchio, trans. San Diego, CA: Parentheses, 1988.
- A Rage of Love. By Alda Merini. Pasquale Verdicchio, trans. Toronto, ON: Guernica, 1996.
- The Holy Land. By Alda Merini and Stephanie H. Jed. Pasquale Verdicchio, trans. Toronto, ON: Guernica Editions, 2002.
- A Desperate Vitality. By Pier Paolo Pasolini. Pasquale Verdicchio, trans. Parentheses Writing Series, 1996.
- The Savage Father. By Pier Paolo Pasolini. Pasquale Verdicchio, trans. Toronto, ON: Guernica, 1999.
- Passenger. By Antonio Porta. Pasquale Verdicchio, trans. Montreal, QC: Guernica Editions, 1986.
- Passenger Selected Poems (1958-1979). 2nd ed. By Antonio Porta. Pasquale Verdicchio, trans. Toronto, ON: Guernica Editions, 2001.
- Salomè. By Antonio Porta. Pasquale Verdicchio, trans. San Diego, CA: Parentheses, 1996.
- Metropolis. By Antonio Porta. Pasquale Verdicchio, trans. Los Angeles, CA: Green Integer, 1999
- Tropes, Monsters, and Poetic Transformations. By Giambattista Vico. Pasquale Verdicchio, trans. San Diego, CA: Parentheses Writing Series, 1990.
- Seventeen Variations on Proposed Themes for a Pure Phonetic Ideology. By Emilio Villa. Pasquale Verdicchio, trans. San Diego, CA: Parentheses Writing Series: 1991.
- Foresta Ultra Naturam/The Forest Beyond Nature. By Emilio Villa. Paul Vangelisti and Pasquale Verdicchio, trans. San Francisco: Red Hill Press, 1989.
