= Guernica Editions =

Canadian independent publisher

- Founded: 1978
- Founder: Antonio D'Alfonso
- Country of origin: Canada
- Headquarters location: Montreal
- Distribution: UTP Distribution
- Publication types: Books
- Official website: guernicaeditions.com

Guernica Editions is a Canadian independent publisher established in Montreal, Quebec, in 1978, by Antonio D'Alfonso. Guernica specializes in Canadian literature, poetry, fiction and nonfiction.

Guernica's current publishers are Connie McParland (Montreal) and editor in chief Michael Mirolla (Toronto).

Guernica Editions began as a bilingual press and in the first decade published works in English and in French. It also published many Quebec authors in English translations. They include : Nicole Brossard, Jacques Brault, Yolanda Villemaire, Rejean Ducharme and Suzanne Jacob.

In 1994, Guernica Editions moved operations from Montreal to Toronto and focused on English language books and only occasionally printed books in French.

One of Guernica's significant contributions to Canadian letters is its promotion of ethnic minority writers including Italian-Canadian authors, Dutch, Arab, Greek, and African-Canadian writers and others. (Clarke 2012)

== The Guernica Writers Series ==
In 2000, Antonio D'Alfonso, a bilingual writer and translator working in English and French, established the 'Writers Series' which was later renamed 'Essential Writers Series'. Each monograph was devoted to a Canadian author and edited by senior Canadian academics.

Initially co-directed by Antonio D'Alfonso and Joseph Pivato, Pivato became the sole editor in 2010. By 2019, the series included over 50 volumes with monographs on such Canadian authors as Sheila Watson, Robert Kroetsch, M.G. Vassanji, Jack Hodgins, George Elliott Clarke, Nino Ricci, Alistair MacLeod, Aritha Van Herk, F.G. Paci, Al Purdy, Mary di Michele, David Adams Richards, Anne Hebert, Daniel David Moses, Caterina Edwards, Don McKay, P.K. Page, Nicole Brossard, Drew Hayden Taylor, Joy Kogawa, Gary Geddes, Kristjana Gunnars, Pier Giorgio DiCicco and others.

A number of Guernica anthologies have been used as texts in college and university literature courses. They include The Anthology of Italian-Canadian Writing (1998), Voices in the Desert: An Anthology of Arabic Canadian Women Writers (2002) (Sugars), Pillars of Lace: The Anthology of Italian-Canadian Women Writers (1998) (Gundale), Ricordi: Things Remembered (1989), Social Pluralism and Literary History (1996) (Verduyn) Adjacencies: Minority Writing in Canada (2002) and other titles. (Pivato 2007)

== Literary Awards ==
Several Guernica books have won literary prizes, including

- Remembering History by Rhea Tregebov won the 1983 Pat Lowther Award for Poetry.
- Les Ages de l'amour by Dorothy Livesay and translated by Jean Antonin Billiard won the 1989 Governor General translation award.
- Aknos by Fulvio Caccia won the 1994 Governor General award for French poetry.
- Contrasts: Comparative Essays on Italian-Canadian Writing by J. Pivato won the 1985 Bressani Prize.
- Island of the Nightingales by Caterina Edwards won the 2001 Howard O'Hagan Award for Short Fiction.
- Keeping Afloat by M. Travis Lane won the 2002 Atlantic Poetry Award.
- The Stalinist's Wife, by France Théoret and translated by Luise von Flotow, was shortlisted for the 2013 Governor General's Award for Translation (French to English).
- Where the Sun Shines Best by Austin Clarke was shortlisted for the 2013 Governor General's Award for Poetry (English Language).
- Eye by Marianne Micros was shortlisted for the 2019 Governor General's Award for Fiction (English Language).
