= Arent van Curler =

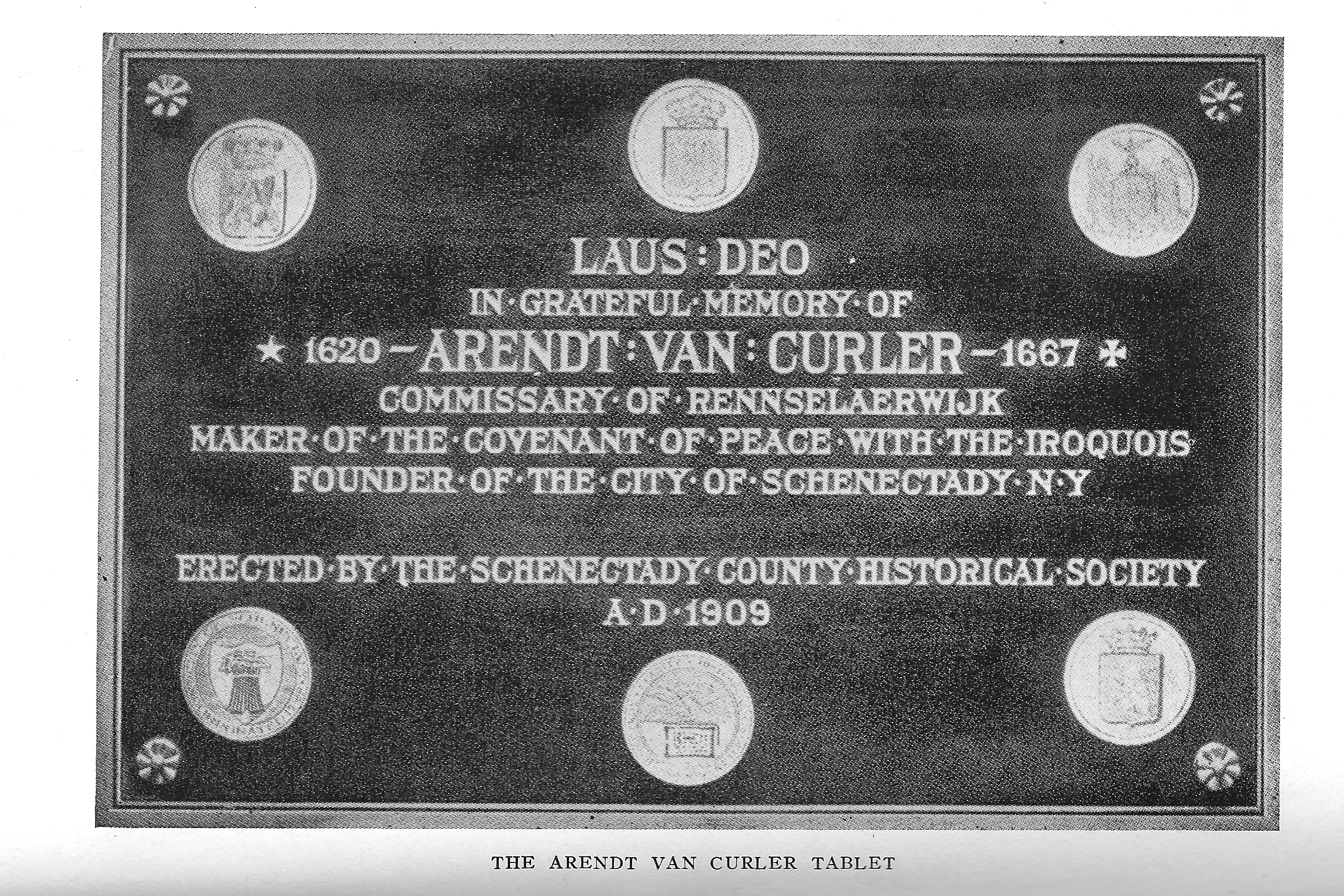
Arent van Curler memorial tablet, Nijkerk, Netherlands

Arent van Curler, later van Corlaer, (1619 or 1620 - 1667) was the grandnephew of Kiliaen van Rensselaer. In 1637 Rensselaer commissioned him as his secretary and accountant at Rensselaer's patroonship Rensselaerswyck in the Dutch colony of New Netherland.

== Life ==
As time went on, Rensselaer began to suspect that Van Curler was neglecting his management duties to engage in the fur trade. Dominie Johannes Megapolensis reported that van Curler had built a fine house and was drinking more than occasionally. In the summer of 1642, Van Curler began to develop a large farm, located on the west side of the Hudson, four miles above Fort Orange, in an area called "de Vlackte".

In August 1642, French Jesuit missionary Isaac Jogues was captured by the Mohawk and brought to their village of Ossernenon. Hearing of this, Van Curler visited the "first castle" and attempted to ransom Jogues, but without success as the Mohawk were not inclined to release him at that time. In the autumn of 1643, the Mohawk were persuaded to bring the priest with them when they came to Beverwijck to trade. Once there, van Curler helped Jogues to escape, hiding him his barn until a deal could be reached and the Frenchman put on a ship to take him downriver to New Amsterdam. In 2011 the Colonie Historical Society and the town historian were working on an interpretive sign for Schuyler Flatts Park to commemorate this.

The ransoming of Jogues brought a change in how the Mohawk treated captives. The following year Jesuit missionary François-Joseph Bressani was brought to Fort Orange to be ransomed for a substantial price in trade goods, for which the Dutch later sought reimbursement from the French.

Also in 1643, Van Curler married the widow of Jonas Bronck, Teuntie Joriaens, also known as Antonia Slaaghboom, and the couple settled in Beverwijck, near Fort Orange. In 1663 he had a son by Anneke Schaets, daughter of Gideon Schaets, the dominie of Beverwijck.

In 1662, he founded the city of Schenectady on land he purchased from the Mohawks. He was known for his fair dealings with the Indians, negotiating disputes and arranging for captives to be freed. He also fathered a child with a Mohawk woman, possibly before his marriage to Teuntie Joriaens. For many years the Mohawks called the governors of New York "Corlaer", using his name as a title, because of the high regard in which they held him.

In 1666 he aided De Courcelle, governor of New France, who ran into difficulties while on an expedition to the Mohawk Valley, supplying the French with provisions. In 1667, on a trip to Quebec at the invitation of Governor de Tracy he drowned in Lake Champlain when his boat overturned in Perou Bay during a storm.

The Hotel Van Curler in Schenectady, built in 1925 – now Elston Hall of Schenectady County Community College – was named after Arent van Curler. Van Corlaer Elementary School, built in 1914 on Guilderland Avenue in Schenectady, is also named after him. In the birthplace of van Curler, Nijkerk, two districts and two schools named after him.
