= AICW =

AICW may refer to:

- Advanced Individual Combat Weapon
- Association of Italian-Canadian Writers

== See also ==
- Intracoastal Waterway, an inland waterway along the Atlantic coast of the US
