= Johannes Megapolensis =

Dutch-American Protestant pastor and missionary

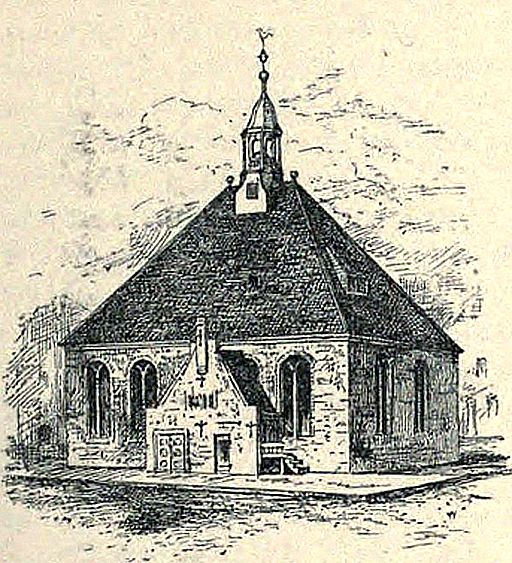
Dutch Reformed Church of Johannes Megapolensis, erected in 1656, at Rensselaerswyck Mannor

Johannes Megapolensis (Note: Megapolensis is a Hellenized rendition of Mekelenburg.) (1603–1670) was a dominie (pastor) of the Dutch Reformed Church in the Dutch colony of New Netherland (present-day New York state in the United States), beginning in 1642. Serving for several years at Fort Orange (present-day Albany, New York) on the upper Hudson River, he is credited with being the first Protestant missionary to the Indians in North America. He later served as a minister in Fort Amsterdam on Manhattan Island, staying through the takeover by the English in 1664.

The minister is widely known as the author of A Short Account of the Mohawk Indians, their Country, Language, Figure, Costume, Religion, and Government, first published from his letters by friends in 1644 in North Holland, and being translated into English in 1792 and printed in Philadelphia. He is also known for having assisted the French missionary, Father Isaac Jogues escape from the Mohawk Indians in 1643. The priest had been serving as a missionary to the Hurons and had been taken captive by the Mohawk. After his tenure in Rensselaerwyck, Megapolensis went to New Amsterdam intending to return to Holland. Governor Peter Stuyvesant prevailed upon him to remain and undertake the duties of a pastor. In 1664, he was instrumental in facilitating a smooth transition to British rule.

== Early life ==
Megapolensis was born in Koendyck (Koedijk, Netherlands in 1603. His father, also named Johannes, was a Protestant dominie or minister in Egmont-aan-Zee. The father Latinized the family name from the original van Mecelenburg. (Another source suggests the original name was von Grootstede.) However, from his translations of the Van Rensselaer Bowier Manuscripts, A.J.F. van Laer suggests that Megapolensis was not the son, but the nephew of Johannes, Sr. and married the daughter of the latter's wife by her first marriage. Megapolensis studied Catholicism at Cologne but became disenchanted with its particular precepts and customs. At the objection of his family he became a Protestant clergyman at an early age. For this he was disinherited.

In 1630 the younger Megapolensis married Mathilde Willems in the Netherlands. The couple had at least four children born there in the next twelve years. Their son Johannes became a surgeon working at Fort Orange. In 1654, their daughter Hillegond married Cornelis van Ruyven, secretary to the colonial Council.

In 1629 Megapolensis entered the ministry and commenced conducting services at Wieringerwaard, and four years later at Sehoorel and Berge in the Classis of Alkmaar. In November, 1641, Domine Johannes Backerus introduced him to the Classis of Amsterdam with the idea that he was willing to pursue a pioneering effort as a minister in New Netherland at the patroon of Killiaen Van Rensselaer. Here he was introduced to Van Rensselaer on March 6, 1642, and signed a contract that committed him to the task for six years, at a salary of a thousand guilders for the first two years, with an increase thereafter. The contract also stipulated that he be provided with a free house with provisions of food. Megapolensis his wife and four children sailed for the New World on June 6, 1642. Upon their arrival at New Amsterdam they remained on Manhattan Island for a brief period where he was introduced to Reverend Everardus Bogardus, who was directed to extend a friendly welcome. By the following August they had settled in to their new home near Fort Orange.

== Rensselaerwyck ==
In 1642 Megapolensis was hired by Kiliaen van Rensselaer, the Patroon of Rensselaerwyck, a vast estate encompassing much of what is now Albany and Rensselaer counties, to serve as minister to his territory in the Calvinist Dutch Reformed Church. Megapolensis and his family went to New Netherland, where he served in Rensselaerswyck and later Fort Orange until 1649. With its strategic location Fort Orange and its nearby settlements soon attracted many traders and Indians alike. However, because of the many different peoples and interests it was also the center of many conflicts.

At first the family lived in what is now Greenbush, New York, before moving to Fort Orange (now the city of Albany). Van Rensselaer also needed someone he could trust to be his principal adviser and to keep him informed of the social and business activity in the manor. Megapolensis was given authority that extended further than matters of church and religion, and was appointed to act as the arbiter of all disputes arising between the chief official of the colony, Arent van Curler, and his subordinate, Adriaen van der Donck, and to see that the general patroon was dealt with in a fair and ethical manner. His decision was to stand uncontested until a review on matters conducted by van Rensselaer himself occurred. The contract was for six years. A disagreement arose between van Rensselaer and the Directors of the Dutch West India Company, the Directors maintaining that they alone had the authority to commission clergy for the colony. As the ship was about to sail, the parties resolved their differences, neither side conceding their prerogatives. When it became known that Van Rensselaer planned to erect a church upriver at Rensselaerswyck, Governor Kieft hastened his plans to rebuild the church in Fort Amsterdam, where Megapolensis would later serve.

For five years Megapolensis held services in the patroon's mill house on the east side of the Hudson River. (Note: During the 17th and 18th centuries the Hudson River was commonly referred to as the North River, while the Delaware River was referred to as the South River.) In 1647 he was afforded the use of an old warehouse on the west side of the river, which had been donated by the West India Company, which put his services closer to the general population of Rensselaerswyck Manor and Fort Orange. The warehouse was converted to include a pulpit, nine pews and special benches for the Elders and Deacons. For nearly seven years Megapolensis and his successor Gideon Schaats held Sunday services in the warehouse, but with the spring floods coming from the river every year, the foundation began to give way and the warehouse eventually had to be abandoned.

During this period, Megapolensis served as missionary to the Mohawk people, and is believed to be the first Protestant missionary to Native Americans in North America. The Mohawk territory was west of Fort Orange in the Mohawk River valley but extending up to the St. Lawrence River and down to the Delaware River, with other territories used for hunting. During the summer trading season, Mohawks frequently spent the night in Dutch houses, including the Dominie's.

He became fluent in the Mohawk language (Note: The Indians possessed a written language but it was in the form of hieroglyphics.) and recorded many details about the Mohawk people and their culture. He described their language as being very difficult to learn. In his endeavor to learn the language and compile a vocabulary he frequently asked the Mohawk how they referred to various things and ideas. From his letters home, his friends in the Netherlands compiled A Short Account of the Mohawk Indians, their Country, Language, Figure, Costume, Religion, and Government, publishing it in North Holland in 1644. This was apparently done without his knowledge or permission. The account was reprinted by Joost Hartgers in 1651 in the Netherlands. The first English translation by Ebenezer Hazard was printed by him in 1792 in Philadelphia, with a revised translation by Brodhead in 1857. Another version translated by A. Clinton Crowell of Brown University was printed in 1909 by Jameson in the United States.

In his letters, Megapolensis had compared the land of Rensselaerwyck to that of Germany and described the rich abundance of game, birds and other wildlife. Megapolensis described Mohawk dress, marriage customs and culture. He characterized the Mohawk ritual torture of captives as cruel, but noted that they seldom killed people in their culture, despite their lack of laws and authorities as he understood them. He contrasted that with the much higher rate of murders in his home country of the Netherlands.

Megapolensis is widely noted for assisting French Catholic missionary Isaac Jogues escape captivity, when he was being held and tortured by the Mohawk Indians. They were hostile to Jogues because of his association with the French, who had made attacks against Mohawk villages. In the autumn of 1642, Jogues was captured by the Mohawk and brought to their village of Ossernenon and subjected to prolonged torture. Hearing of this, Arent van Curler, commissary of Rensselaerwyck, visited the "first castle" of the Mohawks and attempted to ransom Jogues, but without success as the Mohawk were not inclined to release him at that time. About a year later, the Mohawk were persuaded to bring the priest with them when they came to Beverwijck to trade. Once there, Van Curler helped Jogues to escape. The dominie helped conceal the priest until a deal could be reached and the Frenchman put on a ship to take him downriver. Pastor Megapolensis befriended Jogues and accompanied him to New Amsterdam, where Jogues stayed with the pastor while waiting for a ship to take him to France. (Note: The following year French Jesuit François-Joseph Bressani, also captured and severely tortured by Mohawk Indians, was ransomed by Dutch traders.) In a letter of September 28, 1658, to the Classis of Amsterdam, Megapolensis wrote of the gruesome ordeal that had befallen Jogues, and another French missionary, François-Joseph Bressani, at the hands of the Mohawk. He also describes other encounters involving relations between the French and the Mohawk.

== New Amsterdam ==
At the conclusion of his term of ministry at Fort Orange, Megapolensis planned to return to Holland, but was asked by Pieter Stuyvesant to become chief minister of the Dutch church in New Amsterdam. The dominie was initially reluctant and had to be persuaded with "friendly force". By the time he decided to stay, his wife had already sailed and returned to New Amsterdam in 1650. As dominie in New Amsterdam, Megapolensis was also responsible for mission stations in Bergen, New Jersey, the village of Haarlem, and occasionally in Brooklyn. In 1652, the Amsterdam classis sent Samuel Drisius, who had served in, but fled from London, to assist Megapolensis. In 1656 Megapolensis purchased land in the city from Abraham Isaacsen Verplanck. That same year Lutherans in New Netherland petitioned for permission for public worship. This was opposed both by the authorities in the colony as well as in Amsterdam as it was viewed as reducing the Reformed congregation. The Lutherans wrote the Lutheran consistory in Amsterdam to send a good, God-fearing preacher, "...since among the Reformed here there is one who formerly was a Jesuit and on that account is very politic and disputatious.". By this they meant Dominie Megapolensis. They also charged that the baptismal liturgy used was too similar to "the Papal church".

On March 18, 1655, he sent a letter to the Classis at Amsterdam, noting, “Last summer some Jews came here from Holland in order to trade... they came several times to my house, weeping and bemoaning their misery. If I directed them to the Jewish merchants, they said they would not even lend them a few stivers”. Megapolensis further argued that the followers of the “unrighteous Mammon” aimed to get possession of Christian property and to outdo other merchants by drawing all trade toward themselves. These “godless rascals, who are of no benefit to the country, but look at everything for their own profit, may be sent away from here.” But, the source of this information, (see citation) a 2005 writing, full of non-supported quandary, speculation, projection and assumption from the author, does not include citations for this account. Given that this cited 2005 article written by Leo Hershkowitz includes references to support some provisions but not this account, puts into question the accuracy of Hershkowitz work. Had such letters been written, Johanne Megapolenis to the Classis at Amsterdam, undoubtedly the language of the original letters would have been written in Dutch, but Hershkowitz cites long quotations written in English and does not include any source of the supposed translation he referred to. Without a solid source of the translation, one can conclude the intent made by including this was as a character assassination of Megapolenis. This entire biography contains irrelevant and often unfounded suggestions of fact and many personal opinions or outlandish conclusions, that serve no useful purpose within this biography and the reference to Hershkowitz 2005 article epitomizes this.

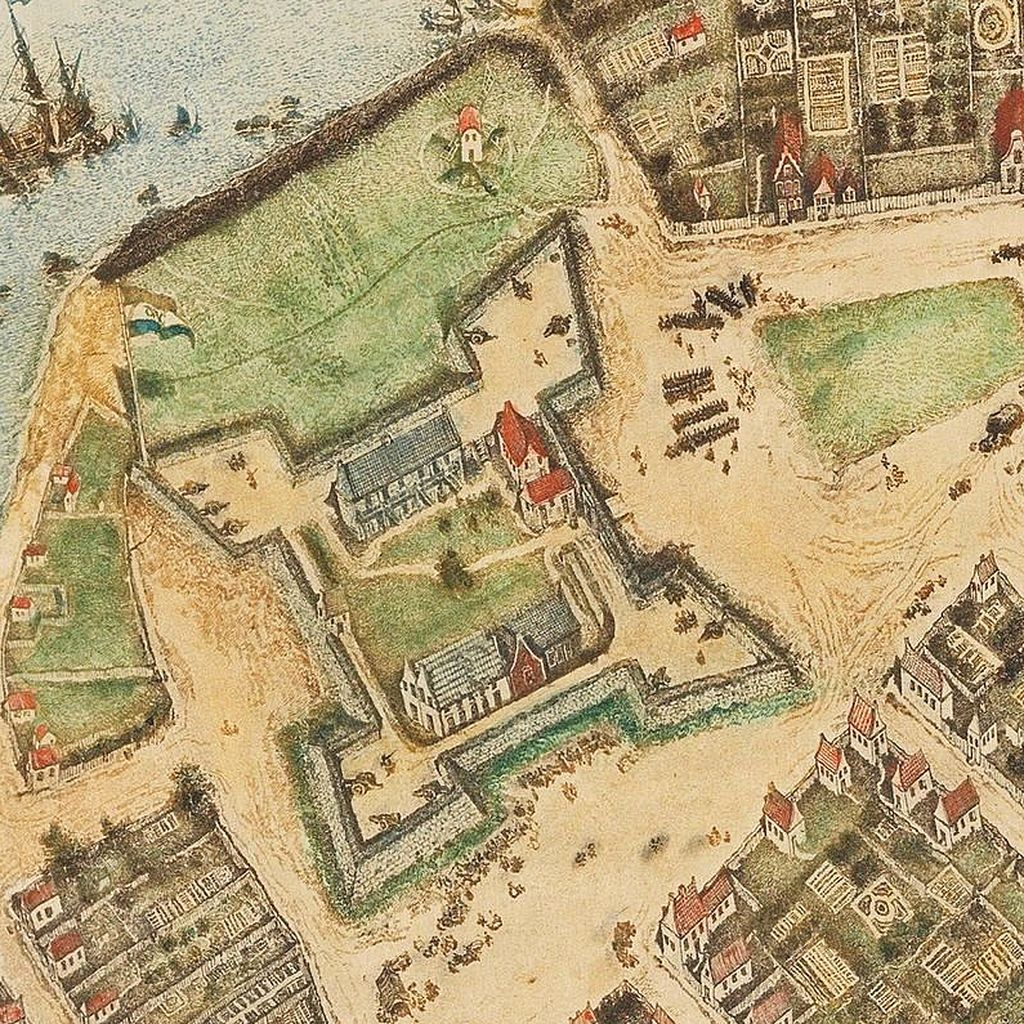
Fort Amsterdam in 1660. (detail)

After Stuyvesant's departure in July from his failed mission in the West Indies he returned to Manhattan and found a fleet and crews totaling seven-hundred men waiting for him in the harbor, where he promptly received orders to move on the Swedes at Fort Casimir and other objectives in the disputed territory along the Delaware River. On August 25 Megapolensis arranged for a day of fasting and prayer for the successful completion of the coming expedition. On the first Sunday of September, Megapolensis held services at Fort Amsterdam, just prior to the departure of the fleet on its mission. Megapolensis accompanied Peter Stuyvesant, who was commander of a fleet. Upon the arrival of the fleet the modest garrison at Fort Casimir immediately discovered that it was no match against Stuyvesant's force. Subsequently a flag of truce was sent to the fort with demands of its surrender, which after some protest, occurred without any bloodshed, after which the commander of the fort boarded Stuyvesant's ship and signed the terms of surrender. On the following Sunday Megapolensis held services for the crews and any Swede who wished to attend.

By 1656 there was a growing number of Swedish and German Lutherans in New Amsterdam, who, instead of attending Megapolensis' services, held their own services in various private homes. The congregation of the Dutch Reformed Church, and Peter Stuyvesant in particular, were opposed at the prospect of new religions establishing themselves in New Netherland. Stuyvesant made concerted efforts to thwart any inroads made by the Quakers, Lutherans, French Jesuits and Jews to establish themselves in the Dutch Colony. In 1658, Reverend Megapolensis continued to lament the inroads that various other religious orders were making in the colony, fearing that it would create religious discord and division among the people of the colony. Of the Quakes he said, "The raving Quakers have not settled down, but continue to disturb the peace of the province by their wanderings and outcries." At this time French Jesuit Simon Le Moyne journeyed from Ossernenon to Fort Orange and then to New Amsterdam to attend to the few Catholics residing there as well as some French sailors who had recently arrived in port with a prize ship. While there, he paid a call on Megapolensis to thank him for his kindness to Jogues. Le Moyne, like Megapolensis, had become religiously involved with the Hurons and Iroquois, and subsequently he and Le Moyne, regardless of religious differences, formed a close friendship.

In 1664 after serving at Rensselaerswyck Manor for six years, Megapolensis arrived at Fort Amsterdam from. His arrival at Fort Amsterdam was subsequent to his assisting French missionary, Isaac Jogues, in his escape from the Mohawks. His wife had already departed for Holland some weeks before. Reverend Backerus had retired over political indifference with Stuyvesant and returned to Holland and subsequently the colony was in need for another minister. With children also in need of baptism and religious instruction, Megapolensis was persuaded by Stuyvesant to remain in Manhattan, to which the former consented. When an overwhelming English fleet arrived that year, Megapolensis and his son Samuel, a physician as well as minister, were among the advisers counseling Stuyvesant, to surrender New Amsterdam to the English, who ultimately took control of the Dutch colony. The West India Company would later blame the capitulation on councilors and clergymen.."...desirous of saving their houses which were next to the fort." Susanah Shaw Romney says that his daughter Hillegond van Ruyven and Lydia de Meyer crossed enemy lines to Long Island to conduct back-door negotiations with the English. Shortly after their return, "...a council of residents and colonial leaders presented Stuyvesant with English terms, and he finally empowered a group of Amsterdammers to negotiate the peaceful handover."

Staying in New York, as it was renamed by the English, the minister helped establish the rights of the Reformed Church under English rule. His role in the surrender may have had repercussions, as on two separate occasions years later, prominent Dutch citizens testified under oath to his loyalty to the West India Company. Some accounts say that Megapolensis returned to Holland a few years later in 1668, where he died. According to Thomas DeWitt, it was his son Samuel, associate pastor at New Amsterdam, who returned to Holland.

== Writing ==
- Megapolensis, Johannes Jr. (1644). Brodhead, John Romeyn (ed.). A Short Sketch of the Mohawk Indians in New Netherland (PDF).

== Bibliography ==
- Balmer, Randall Herbert (2002). A Perfect Babel of Confusion: Dutch Religion and English Culture in the Middle Colonies. Oxford University Press. ISBN 978-0-19515-2654.
- Benham, W. Hamilton (1917). "The Churches and Clergy of Colonial New York". Proceedings of the New York State Historical Association. 16. Fenimore Art Museum: 82–102. JSTOR 42889556.
- Brodhead, John Romeyn (1853). History of the state of New York. Vol. I. Harper & Brothers.
- Carney, Thomas E. (Fall 2004). "A Tradition to Live By: New York Religious History, 1624–1740". New York History. 85 (4). Fenimore Art Museum: 301–330. JSTOR 23187346.
- Corwin, Charles E. (October 1926). "The First Ministers in the Middle Colonies". Journal of the Presbyterian Historical Society (1901-1930). 12 (6). Presbyterian Historical Society: 346–384. JSTOR 23323607.
- Senate, E. Croswell (1902). Ecclesiastical Records, 'Documents of the Senate of the State of New York. Vol. 14. New York (State). Legislature.
- Denner, Diana (July 6, 2011). New interpretive sign to adorn Schuyler Flatts Park, Troy Record.
- Fiske, John (1899). The Dutch and Quaker colonies in America. Vol. I. Boston; New York: Houghton, Mifflin and Company.
- Frijhoff, Willem (2007). Fulfilling God's Mission: The Two Worlds of Dominie Everardus Bogardus, 1607-1647. BRILL. ISBN 978-9-00416-2112.
- Jacobs, Jaap (2009). The colony of New Netherland : a Dutch settlement in seventeenth-century America. Ithaca, N.Y.: Cornell University Press. p. 147. ISBN 978-0-8014-7516-0. OCLC 320799054.
- Jameson, John Franklin (1909). Narratives of New Netherland, 1609-1664. Vol. VIII. Charles Scribner Sons.
- Jones, Frederick Robertson; Thorpe, Francis Newton (1903). "The Dutch Under English Rule". In Lee, Guy Carleton (ed.). The History of North America. New York: G. Barrie & sons. p. 167. "Willem Hendrick."
- Lamb, Martha Joanna; Burton, Harrison (1877). History of the city of New York : its origin, rise, and progress. New York: A.S. Barnes.
- Meuwese, Mark (2011). 'Brothers in Arms, Partners in Trade. Brill. ISBN 978-9-00421-5160.
- Pouliot, Léon (1966). Brown, George W.; Trudel, Marcel (eds.). Dictionary of Canadian Biography. Vol. I. University of Toronto Press.
- Rink, Oliver A. (July 1994). "Private Interest and Godly Gain: The West India Company and the Dutch Reformed Church in New Netherland, 1624–1664". New York History. 75 (3). Fenimore Art Museum: 245–264. JSTOR 23182041.
- Shorto, Russell (2004). The island at the center of the world. New York : Doubleday. ISBN 978-1-40007-8677.
- Snow, Dean R.; Starna, William A.; Gehring, Charles T. (1996). In Mohawk Country: Early Narratives about a Native People. Syracuse University Press. ISBN 978-0-81560-4105.
- William Buell Sprague, ed. (1857). Johannes Megapolensis, 'Annals of the American Pulpit. Vol. IX. Robert Carter & Brothers.
- van den Hout, J. (2018). Adriaen van der Donck: A Dutch Rebel in Seventeenth-Century America. SUNY Press. ISBN 978-1-43846-9225.
- van der Sijs, Nicoline (2009). CHAPTER 3. Dutch influence on North American Indian languages. Amsterdam University Press. JSTOR j.ctt45kf9d.7. "Chapter 3, from Cookies, Coleslaw, and Stoops: The Influence of Dutch on the North American Languages"
- Van Rensselaer, Schuyler (1909). History of the city of New York in the seventeenth century. Vol. I. The Macmillan Company.
- Romney, Susanah Shaw (2014). New Netherland Connections. UNC Press Books. ISBN 978-1-46961-4250.
- Wilson, James Grant (1892–1893). The memorial history of the city of New York, from its first settlement to the year 1892. Vol. I. New York History Co.
- Wilson, James Grant; Fiske, John, eds. (1888). Appletons' Cyclopædia of American Biography. Vol. IV. New York: D. Appleton and Company.
- Zwierlein, Frederick James (1910). Religion in New Netherland : a history of the development of the religious conditions in the province of New Netherland, 1623-1664. Rochester, N.Y.: John P. Smith Printing Company.
- New-York Historical Society (1857). Collections of the New York Historical Society, VIII, part I. New York: D. Appleton and Company. p. 142.
- State of New York Education Department (April 6, 1908). 90th Annual Report 1907 v.2 supplement 7. Albany: University of The State of New York.
- Deed, Abraham Verplanck to Rev. Johannes Megapolensis, Jan.21, 1656. Vol. 46. The John Watts De Peyster Publication Fund Series. 1914.
- Collections of the New York Historical Society. Vol. 1. New York: H. Ludwig. 1841.
