= Haudenosaunee clothing =

Traditional and modern garments of the Haudenosaunee nations

A representation of a Seneca man in traditional dress

Haudenosaunee clothing is the traditional and modern garments of the six Haudenosaunee nations. Haudenosaunee fashion has changed substantially since European colonization, shaped by both the introduction of new materials and the effects of colonial warfare and territorial dispossession.

== History ==
=== 1600s ===
In 1644, Johannes Megapolensis described Mohawk traditional wear:

In summer they go naked, having only their private parts covered with a patch. The children and young folks to ten, twelve and fourteen years of age go stark naked. In winter, they hang about them simply an undressed deer or bear or panther skin; or they take some beaver and otter skins, wild cat, racoon, martin, otter, mink, squirrel or such like skins ... and sew some of them to others, until it is a square piece, and that is then a garment for them; or they buy of us Dutchmen two and a half ells [about 170 centimetres (5.6 ft)] of duffel, and that they hang simply about them, just as it was torn off, without sewing it.

The women wore their hair very long and tied together at the back, or "tied at the back of the head and folded into a tress of about a hand's length, like a beaver tail ... they wear around the forehead a strap of wampum shaped like the headband that some was worn in olden times." "The men have a long lock hanging down, some on one side of the head, and some on both sides. On the top of their heads they have a streak of hair from the forehead to the neck, about the breadth of three fingers, and this they shorten until it is about two or three fingers long, and it stands right on end like a cock's comb or hog's bristles; on both sides of this cock's comb they cut all the hair short, except for the aforesaid locks, and they also leave on the bare places here and there small locks, such as aree in sweeping brushes and then they are in fine array." This is the forerunner to what is today called a "Mohawk hairstyle".

The women did not paint their faces. The men "paint their faces red, blue, etc."

The Haudenosaunee wore moccasins, "true to nature in its adjustment to the foot, beautiful in its materials and finish, and durable as an article of apparel."

The moccason is made of one piece of deer-skin. It is seamed up at the heel, and also in front, above the foot, leaving the bottom of the moccasin without a seam. In front the deer-skin is gathered, in place of being crimped; over this part porcupine quills or beads are worked, in various patterns. The plain moccasin rises several inches above the ankle ... and is fastened with deer strings; but usually this part is turned down, so as to expose a part of the instep, and is ornamented with bead-work.

Moccasins of a sort were also made of corn husks.

In 1653, Dutch official Adriaen van der Donck wrote:

Around their waist they all [i.e.both men and women] wear a belt made of leather, whalefin, whalebone, or wampum. The men pull a length of duffel cloth—if they have it—under this belt, front and rear, and pass it between the legs. It is over half an ell [35 centimetres (14 in)] wide and nine quarter-ells [155 centimetres (61 in)] long, which leaves a square flap hanging down in front and back ... Before duffel cloth was common in that country, and sometimes even now when it cannot be had, they took for that purpose some dressed leather or fur—The women also wear a length of woolen cloth of full width [165 centimetres (65 in)] and an ell and a quarter [90 centimetres (35 in)] long, which comes halfway down the leg. It is like a petticoat, but under it, next to the body, they wear a deerskin which also goes around the waist and ends in cleverly cut pointed edging and fringes. The wealthier women and those who have a liking for it wear such skirts wholly embroidered with wampum ... As for covering the upper part of the body both men and women use a sheet of duffel cloth of full width, i.e. nine and a half quarter-ells, and about three ells 210 centimetres (83 in) long. It is usually worn over the right shoulder and tied in a knot around the waist and from there hangs down to the feet.

During the 17th century, Haudenosaunee clothing changed rapidly as a result of the introduction of scissors and needles obtained from the Europeans, and the British scholar Michael Johnson has cautioned that European accounts of Haudenosaunee clothing from the latter 17th century may not have entirely reflected traditional pre-contact Haudenosaunee clothing. In the 17th century, women normally went topless in the warm months and wore buckskin skirts overlapping on the left, while in the winter women covered their upper bodies with a cape-like upper garment with an opening for the head. By the 18th century, cloth colored red and blue obtained from Europeans became the standard material for clothing with the men and women wearing blouses and shirts that usually decorated with beadwork and ribbons and were often worn alongside silver brooches.

=== 1700s ===
By the 18th century, Haudenosaunee men normally wore shirts and leggings made of broadcloth and buckskin coats. Silver armbands and gorgets were popular accessories throughout the 17th and 18th centuries. By the late 18th century, women were wearing muslin or calico long, loose-fitting overdresses. The tendency of Haudenosaunee women to abandon their traditional topless style of dressing in the warm months reflected European influence. Married women wore their hair in a single braid held in place by a comb made of bone, antler or silver while unmarried wore their hair in several braids. Warriors wore moccasins, leggings and short kilts and on occasion wore robes that were highly decorated with painted designs. Initially, men's clothing was made of buckskin and were decorated with porcupine quillwork and later on was made of broadcloth obtained from Europeans. The bodies and faces of Haudenosaunee men were heavily tattooed with geometric designs and their noses and ears were pieced with rings made up of wampum or silver. On the warpath, the faces and bodies of the warriors were painted half red, half black. The men usually shaved most of their hair with leaving only a tuft of hair in the center, giving the name Mohawk to their hair style. Buckskin ammunition pouches with straps over the shoulder together with belts or slashes that carried powder horns and tomahawks were usually worn by warriors. Quilled knife cases were worn around the neck. Chiefs wore headdresses made of deer antler.

Gusto'weh headdress

Men wore a cap made of either buckskin or cloth tied to wood splints with a single long feather rotating in a socket called a gustoweh. Later, feathers in the gustoweh denote the wearer's tribe by their number and positioning. The Mohawk wear three upright feathers, the Oneida two upright and one down. The Onondaga wear one feather pointing upward and another pointing down. The Cayuga have a single feather at a 45-degree angle. The Seneca wear a single feather pointing up, and the Tuscarora have no distinguishing feathers.

=== 1800s ===
A representation of a Seneca woman in traditional dress

Writing in 1851, Morgan wrote that women's outfits consisted of a skirt (gä-kä'-ah) "usually of blue broadcloth, and elaborately embroidered with bead-work. It requires two yards of cloth, which is worn with the selvedge at the top and bottom; the skirt being secured about the waist and descending nearly to the top of the moccasin." Under the skirt, between the knees and the moccasins, women wore leggings (gise'-hǎ), called pantalettes by Morgan, "of red broadcloth, and ornamented with a border of beadwork around the lower edge ... In ancient times the gise'-hǎ was made of deer-skin and embroidered with porcupine-quill work." An over-dress (ah-de-a'-da-we-sa) of muslin or calico was worn over the skirt, it is "gathered slightly at the waist, and falls part way down the skirt ... In front it is generally buttoned with silver broaches." The blanket (e'yose) is two or three yards of blue or green broadcloth "it falls from the head or neck in natural folds the width of the cloth, as the selvedges are at the top and bottom, and it is gathered round the person like a shawl."

=== 1900s and onward ===
By the 1900s, most Haudenosaunee were wearing the same clothing as their non-Haudenosaunee neighbors. Today most nations only wear their traditional clothing to ceremonies or special events.

== See also ==
- Haudenosaunee
- Wampum
