= John Terpstra =

Canadian poet and carpenter

John Terpstra (born in Brockville, Ontario) is a Canadian poet and carpenter.

During much of his childhood, he lived in Edmonton, Alberta, but moved back to Ontario to attend high school in Hamilton, where he lives today.

Released a spoken-word recording of his poems in 2000, called "Nod Me In, Shake Me Out", with composer, arranger and producer Bart Nameth, violinist Hugh Marsh, and others.

== Education ==
- Trinity Christian College, Chicago
- University of Toronto

== Awards and recognition ==
- 1988: Bressani Prize, "Forty Days and Forty Nights"
- 1992: CBC Radio Literary Competition, "Captain Kintail"
- 2004: poetry finalist, Governor General's Awards, Disarmament
- 2006: finalist, Charles Taylor Prize, BC Award for Canadian Non-fiction, The Boys, or Waiting for the Electrician's Daughter
- 2024: The degree of Doctor of Divinity (honoris causa), Knox College (Toronto, Canada)

== Bibliography ==
- 1982: Scrabbling for Repose (Split Reed)
- 1987: Forty Days and Forty Nights (Netherlandic) ISBN 0-919417-10-8
- 1990: Naked Trees (Netherlandic) ISBN 0-919417-20-5
- 1992: Captain Kintail (Netherlandic) ISBN 0-919417-27-2
- 1997: The Church Not Made With Hands (Wolsak and Wynn) ISBN 0-919897-56-8
- 1998: Devil's Punch Bowl (St Thomas Poetry Series) ISBN 0-9697802-7-3
- 2000: Restoration (Gaspereau) ISBN 1-894031-34-2
- 2002: Falling into Place (Gaspereau) ISBN 1-894031-60-1
- 2003: Disarmament (Gaspereau) ISBN 1-894031-73-3
- 2005: Brendan Luck (Gaspereau) ISBN 1-55447-013-7
- 2005: The Boys, or, Waiting for the Electrician's Daughter (Gaspereau) ISBN 1-55447-011-0
- 2006: Two or Three Guitars: Selected Poems (Gaspereau) ISBN 1-55447-026-9
- 2012: Naked Trees (Wolsak and Wynn) ISBN 978-1-894987-65-3
- 2014: This Orchard Sound (Wolsak and Wynn) ISBN 978-1-894987-92-9
- 2016: In the Company of All (St Thomas Poetry Series) ISBN 978-1-928095-02-6
- 2018: Daylighting Chedoke: Exploring Hamilton's Hidden Creek (Wolsak and Wynn) ISBN 978-1-928088-72-1
- 2020: Wild Hope: Prayers & Poems (St Thomas Poetry Series) ISBN 9781928095040
