= Antonio D'Alfonso =

Canadian writer (born 1953)

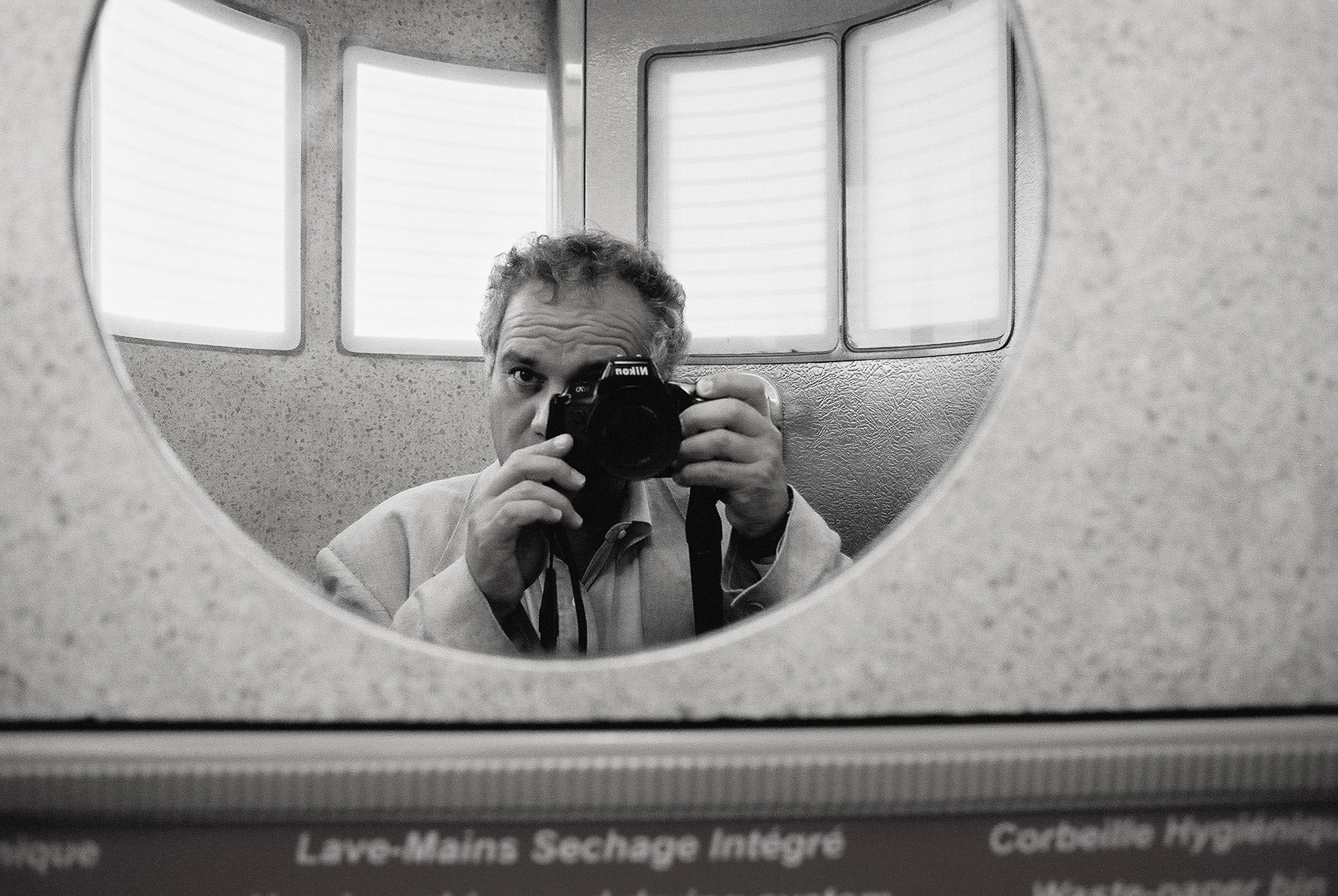
Self-portrait, 2004.

Antonio D'Alfonso (born 6 August 1953) is a Canadian writer, editor, publisher, translator and filmmaker, the founder of Guernica Editions.

== Biography ==
- Antonio D'Alfonso was born in Montreal into an Italian-Canadian family.
- He grew up speaking Italian and attended both English and French schools and became trilingual.
- He earned a BA from Loyola College (Concordia University) and a MA from the Université de Montréal.
- He holds a Ph.D. from the University of Toronto, 2012.
- In 2016, he received an Honorary Doctorate from Athabasca University.
- In 1978 he founded Guernica Editions in Montreal as a bilingual publishing house. D'Alfonso sold Guernica in 2010.
- He co-founded in 1986 the Association of Italian Canadian. Writers in Vancouver, with Joseph Pivato, C.D. Mini, Pasquale Verdicchio, and Pier Giorgio Di Cicco.
- He co-founded with Fulvio Caccia, Lamberto Tassinari, Bruno Ramirez, Gianni Caccia, the tricultural magazine, Vice Versa, in Montreal.
- His Archives can be found at McMaster University.
- Founded Raspa Editions in 2024.

== Education ==
- 1959-60: Saint Aloysius Elementary.
- 1960-64: Saint-Finbarr Elementary.
- 1964-66: Saint-Michel Elementary.
- 1966-70: John F. Kennedy High School.
- 1970-72: Loyola College
- 1972-75: Loyola College/Concordia University. B.A. (Communication Arts)
- 1976-79: Université de Montréal. M.Sc. (Communication Science).
- 2007-2012: University of Toronto. Doctor of Philosophy. Ph.D. Italian Studies (Film).
- 2016: Athabasca University. Honorary Doctorate. Ph.D. of Letters.

== Literary awards ==
- 2000: Fabrizio's Passion won the Bressani Award.
- 2003: La passione di Fabrizio won the Internazionale emigrazione in Italy.
- 2006: Bruco on the New York Independent Film Award.

== Poetry ==
- 1973 : La chanson du shaman à Sedna (1973)
- 1979 : Queror (1979)
- 1983 : Black Tongue (1983)
- 1986 : The Other Shore (1985)
- 1986 : L’Autre rivage (1986)
- 1987 : L’amour panique (1987)
- 1992 : Julia (1992)
- 1992 : Panick Love (1992)
- 1998 : L’apostrophe qui me scinde (1998, 2010)
- 2001 : Comment ça se passe (2001)
- 2002 : Getting on with Politics (2002)
- 2004 : Antigone (2004)
- 2005 : Bruco (2005)
- 2005 : Un homme de trop (2005)
- 2013 : Un ami, un nuage (2013)
- 2014 : The Irrelevant Man (2014)
- 2014 : Ne m’interrompez pas (avec Suzanne Biron) (photos)
- 2016 : Antigone (Ekstasis, 2016)
- 2018 : Antigone (Noroît, 2018).
- 2018 : Collección México (Mantis Editores-Luis Armenta Malpica-Ecrits des forges, 2018)
- 2020 : Two-Headed Man: Collected Poems:1970-2020 (Guernica, 2020)
- 2024 : Vanno più veloce di me (Raspa Editore, 2024, 2026). Translated by Anna Ciamparella.

== Photography ==
- 2026: Visi: Italic Writers in the Country

== Novels ==
- 1990 : Avril ou l’anti-passion
- 1995 : Fabrizio’s Passion
- 2002 : La passione de Fabrizio (transl. by Antonello Lombardi)
- 2004 : Un vendredi du mois d’août
- 2005 : A Friday in August (transl. by Jo-Anne Elder)
- 2007 : L’Aimé

== Memoirs ==
- 2022 : Outside Looking In: Entries 1980-1981 (Ekastsis Editions, 2022-2023)
- 2025 : 19th Avenue (Raspa, 2025)

== Translations ==
- 1985: The Clarity of Voices, by Philippe Haeck (Guernica Editions, 1985) 0-919349-56-0
- 1997: The Films of Jacques Tati, by Michel Chion (Guernica, 1997).
- 2000: Le paysage qui bouge, by Pasquale Verdicchio (Le Noroît, 2000). 2-89018-435-8
- 2003: On Order and Things, by Stefan Psenak (Guernica, 2003).
- 2003: Dreaming Our Space, by Marguerite Andersen (Guernica, 2003).
- 2005: The Blueness of Light, by Louise Dupré (Guernica, 2005).
- 2005: The World Forgotten, by Paul Bélanger (Guernica 2005).
- 2008: The Last Woman, by Claudine Bertrand (Guernica 2008) .
- 2010: The Man Who Delivers Clouds, by José Acquelin (Guernica, 2010).
- 2011: twohundredandfourspoems, by Roger des Roches (Guernica, 2011).
- 2011: Un bonheur inattendu, by Marella Caracciolo Chia (Leméac, 2011)
- 2012: Un bonheur inattendu, by Marella Caracciolo Chia (Syrtes (Paris), 2012).
- 2013: Wings Folded in Cracks, by Jean-Pierre Vallotton (Guernica, 2013)
- 2014: Hours, by Fernand Ouellette (Guernica, 2013).
- 2014: Beyond the Flames, by Louise Dupré (Guernica, 2014)
- 2014: The Body Vagabond, by Martine Audet (Ekstasis, 2014)
- 2014: The Terror Chronicles, by Normand De Bellefeuille (Ekstasis, 2014)
- 2014: Words and the Stone, by Pierrettte Micheloud (Ekstasis, 2014)
- 2014: Manhattan Poems, by Claudio Angelini (Ekstasis, 2014)
- 2015: Farida, a novel by Naïm Kattan, (translated with Norman Cornett) (Guernica, 2015)
- 2015: The Intimate Frailty of Mortals, by Paul Chamberland (Ekstasis, 2015)
- 2015: I travel the world, by Thierry Renard (Ekstasis, 2015)
- 2015: Weeping Will Not Save the Stars, François Guerrette, (Ekstasis, 2015)
- 2016: Poèmes, Kim Doré et Jean-François Poupart. Arc Poetry Magazine.
- 2016: The Wind Under Our Footsteps, Diane Régimbald (Ekstasis, 2016)
- 2016: We are what we love, Bernard Pozier (Ekstasis, 2016)
- 2016: Sails for Exile, Mona Latif-Chattas (with Yasmine Mariam Kloth, Ekstasis, 2016)
- 2016: Toward the Rising Sun, Robert Giroux (Ekstasis, 2016)
- 2017: On Love, Jack Keguenne (Ekstasis, 2017)
- 2017: Daring Touch, Louise Cotnoir (Ekstasis, 2017)
- 2018: Vigil Poems, Jean Royer (Guernica, 2018)
- 2018: Words for the Traveler, Hugues Corriveau (Ekstasis, 2018)
- 2018: Woman with Camera, Corinne Larochelle (Ekstasis, 2018)
- 2018: Night Blues, Yolande Villemaire & Claude Beausoleil (Ekstasis, 2018).
- 2019: Celebrations by Naim Kattan (Ekstasis, 2019).
- 2020: Tell me what moves you, Philippe Haeck (Guernica).
- 2022: Laike et Nahum, Ruth Panofsky (Edition du Noroît).
- 2022: Pessoa in Montreal, Paul Bélanger (Ekstasis Editions).
- 2023. Morning Trains, Viviane Ciampi (Ekstasis Editions).

== Anthologies ==
- Quêtes : Textes d’auteurs italo-québécois (co-edited with Fulvio Caccia, 1984)
- Voix off : Dix poètes anglophones du Québec (1985)
- Found in Translation: An Anthology of Poets from Quebec (2013)
- États des lieux: Trieze poètes américains contemporains, edited by Antoine Boisclair (2013) (Translation of poems by Fanny Howe)

== Essays ==
- In Italics : In Defence of Ethnicity (1996)
- Duologue : On Culture and Identity (with Pasquale Verdicchio, 1998)
- En italiques : Réflexions sur l’ethnicité (2000)
- Gambling with Failure (2005)
- Etnilisuse kaitskes (transl. by Reet Sool, 2006)
- In corsivo italico (transl. by Silvana Mangione, 2009)
- Ne m’interrompez pas (avec Suzanne Biron) (photos) (Noroît, 2015)
- Poetica del Pluriculturalismo (Samuele Editore, 2015)
- Em italico: Reflexoes sobre a ethnicidade (translated by Ala Lucia Silva Paranhos), (UFRGS editora, 2015)
- Antonio D’Alfonso : Essays on His Works. Edited by Licia Canton (Guernica, 2018).
- Pasquale Verdicchio: Essays on His Works. Edited by Antonio D’Alfonso (Guernica, 2019)
- La diaspora italiana in Canada, a cura di Anthony Julian Tamburri e Silvana Mangione (NY: The John D. Calandra Italian American Institute, 2022).
- Altrove: Intellettuali molisani nella diaspora, a cura di Norberto Lombardi (Cosmo Iannone Editore, 2022)
- The Italian Canadian Writer (Ekstasis Editions, 2023)
- I could have been a contender (Casa Lago Press, 2024)
- In Italics (Raspa Editions, 2026). A completely revised and rewritten edition.
- A Conversation with Lazar Rockwood (Raspa Editions, 2026)

== Films ==
- Nonna (short 16mm, black and white, 1973, 2004)
- La Coupe de Circé (short 16mm, black and white, 1974-2005)
- Pour t’aimer (one-half hour 16mm black and white, 1982-1987-2005)
- My Trip to Oaxaca (90 minutes, 2005)
- Bruco (90 minutes, 2005)= Best Foreign Film, Best International Director Award at the New York International Film Festival
- Antigone (87 minutes, 2012)=Bronze Award, Prestige Festival
- Real Gangsters (Frank D’Angelo, 2013, actor)
- Duse and Me (2015, short)
- La chambre éphémère (with Christian Duguay), 2017, document essay.
- Tata (193 minutes, 2020).
- Conversation with Lazar Rockwood (2020).
- Conversation with Monica Lavin (2020).
- Conversation with Pasquale Verdicchio (2020).
- Conversation avec Paul Bélanger (2020).
- Conversation with Damiano Pietropaolo (2021).
- Conversation with Jose Pivato (2021).
- Conversation with Enrico Granafei (2021).
- Conversazione con Gino Chiellino (2022).
- Conversation with Anca Christifovici (2022).
- Conversation with Daniel Sloate (2022).
- Conversation with Luciano Iacobelli (2022).
- Conversation with Maria Mazziotti Gillan (2023).
- Conversation with Robert Marra (2024).
- Conversation with Noah Zacharin (2025)
- Becoming Artimesia (17 minutes, 2023).
- Sono (90 minutes, 2024)
- Mary of Nazareth (90, 2025).
- Heloise d’Argenteuil (20, 2026).
- Hannah Arendt (20, 2026)
