= Joost Hartgers =

Dutch bookseller and publisher

Joost Hartgers (also Joost Hartgersz, Joost Hartgerts, or Ioost Hartgers; active c. 1637–1655) was a Dutch bookseller and publisher of the 17th century in Amsterdam.

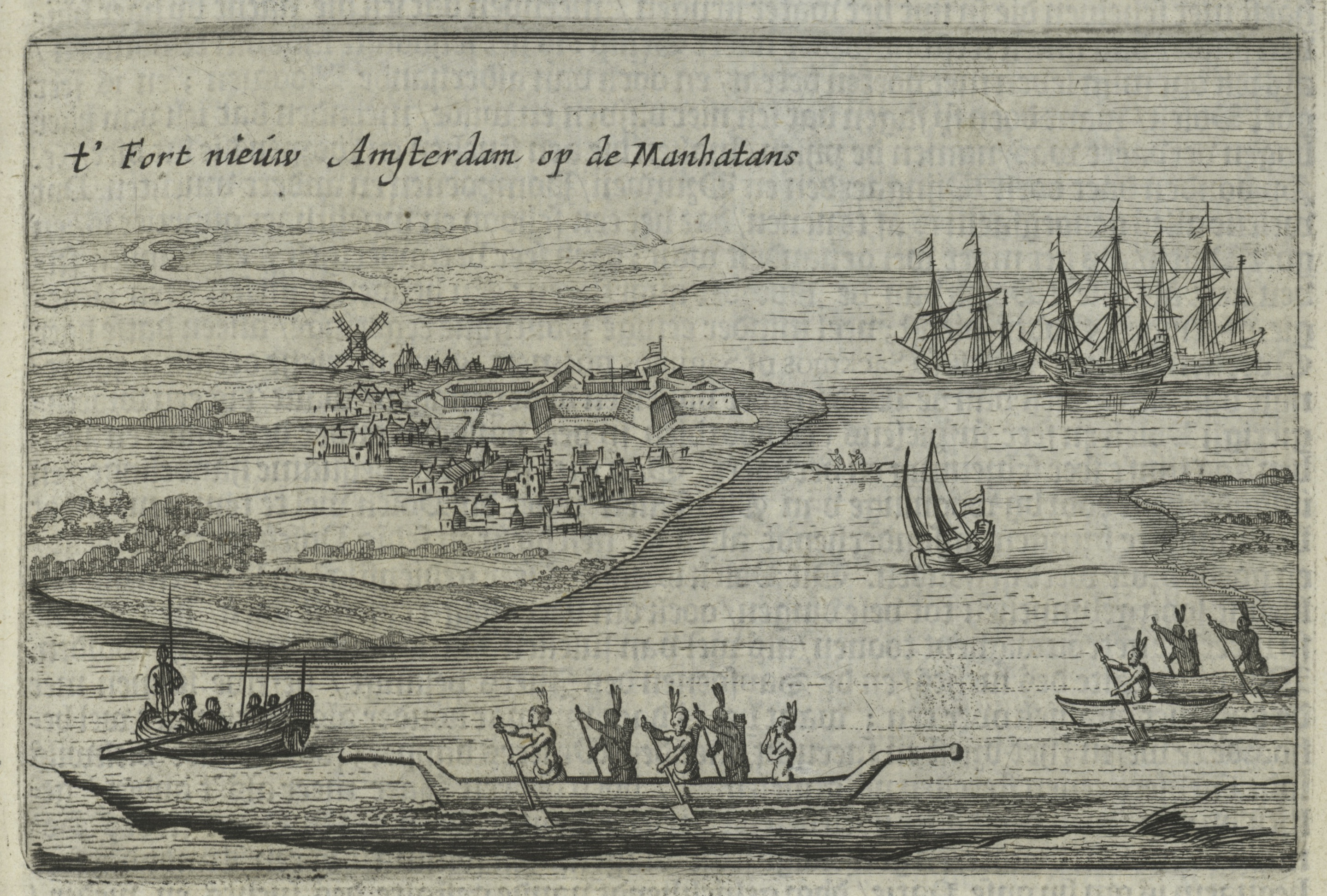
"t' Fort nieuw Amsterdam op de Manhatans" ("The Fort New Amsterdam on the Manhatans" – also known as the "Hartgers View"), the earliest known view of New Amsterdam (Manhattan)

Eerste schip-vaert der Hollanders naer Oost-Indien (Cornelis de Houtman)

He is especially known for his publications of travel accounts, historical works, and maps, and played an important role in disseminating sources on Dutch colonial history, particularly in connection with the Vereenigde Oost-Indische Compagnie (VOC).

== Life ==
Only a few biographical details are known about Joost Hartgers. From 1637, he was active as a bookseller and publisher in Amsterdam, running a shop on the Dam, near the Stadhuis, at the corner of Kalverstraat. His period of activity is estimated to have been roughly from 1637 to 1655.

Michael S. Durham mentions in his book New York that the earliest image of New Amsterdam, the future New York, is based on drawings by Joost Hartgers from 1625 to 1626, showing about 30 simple houses, a windmill, a fort called Fort Amsterdam, and some ships off the coast. The only reason for the existence of this colony was the trade in beaver pelts:

Es zeigt etwa 30 einfache Häuser, eine Windmühle, eine Burg namens Fort Amsterdam und einige Schiffe vor der Küste. Der einzige Grund für die Existenz dieser Kolonie war der Handel mit Biberfellen, die in Holland zu den beliebten Pelzmützen verarbeitet wurden.

== Works ==
Hartgers published a wide variety of printed works, including:

Travel accounts and collections of voyages of discovery, particularly concerning the enterprises of the VOC.

(cf. catalogue.nla.gov.au - here with roughly translated English titles)

[1]. Oost-Indische voyagien door dien begin en voortgangh, van de vereenighde Nederlandtsche gooctroyeerde Oost-Indische Compagnie ... (digitized copy)

East Indian voyages: their beginnings and development, undertaken by the United Chartered Dutch East India Company

[2]. Verhael van de eerste Schip-vaert der hollandische ende Zeeusche Schepen ... (digitized copy)

Narrative of the first sea voyage of the Dutch and Zeeland ships

[3]. Ongeluckige voyagie van't Schip Batavia nae Oost-Indien ... (digitized copy)

The ill-fated voyage of the ship Batavia to the East Indies.

[4]. Diversche discourssen de Oost-Indische &c.

Various discussions concerning the East Indies, etc.

[5]. Eerste Schip-vaert der Hollanders naer Oost-Indien ...

The first Dutch voyage to the East Indies.

[6]. Waerachtigh verhael van de Schip-vaert op Oost-Indien ... (journal of Van Neck and Warwijck)

An authentic account of the voyage to the East Indies.

[7]. Wonderlijcke voyagie by de Hollanders gedaen door de strate Magalanes ...

The remarkable voyage of the Dutch through the Strait of Magellan

[8]. Historis journael van de voyage gedaen met 3 Schepen uyt Zeelant ...

Historical journal of the voyage undertaken with three ships from Zeeland

[9]. Historische verhael van de tresselijcke reyse ... Cornelis Matelieff de Jonge ...

Historical narrative of the hazardous journey.

[10]. Wonderlijcke historische journaelsche aenteyckeningh ... Pieter van den Broecke ... (digitized copy)

Remarkable historical journal entry

[11]. Oost en West-Indische voyagie door de Strate Magallanes ... Ioris Spilbergen ...

East and West Indian voyage through the Strait of Magellan

[11 cont. ]. Journael ofter Beschrijvinge van de wonderlijcke reyse ... Willem Cornelisz Schouten van Hoorn ...

Journal or description of the wondrous voyage.

[12]. Journael vande nassausche vloot ... (digitized copy)

Journal of the Nassau fleet

[13]. Journael ofte Gedenckwaerdige beschrijvinge can de Oost-Indische reyse van Willen Ysbrantsz ...

Journal or memorable account of the East Indian voyage of Willem Ysbrantsz

[14]. Generale Beschrijvinge van Indien ... (digitized copy)

General description of India

[16]. Beschrijvinghe van het machtigh coninckrijcke Japan ...

Description of the mighty kingdom of Japan

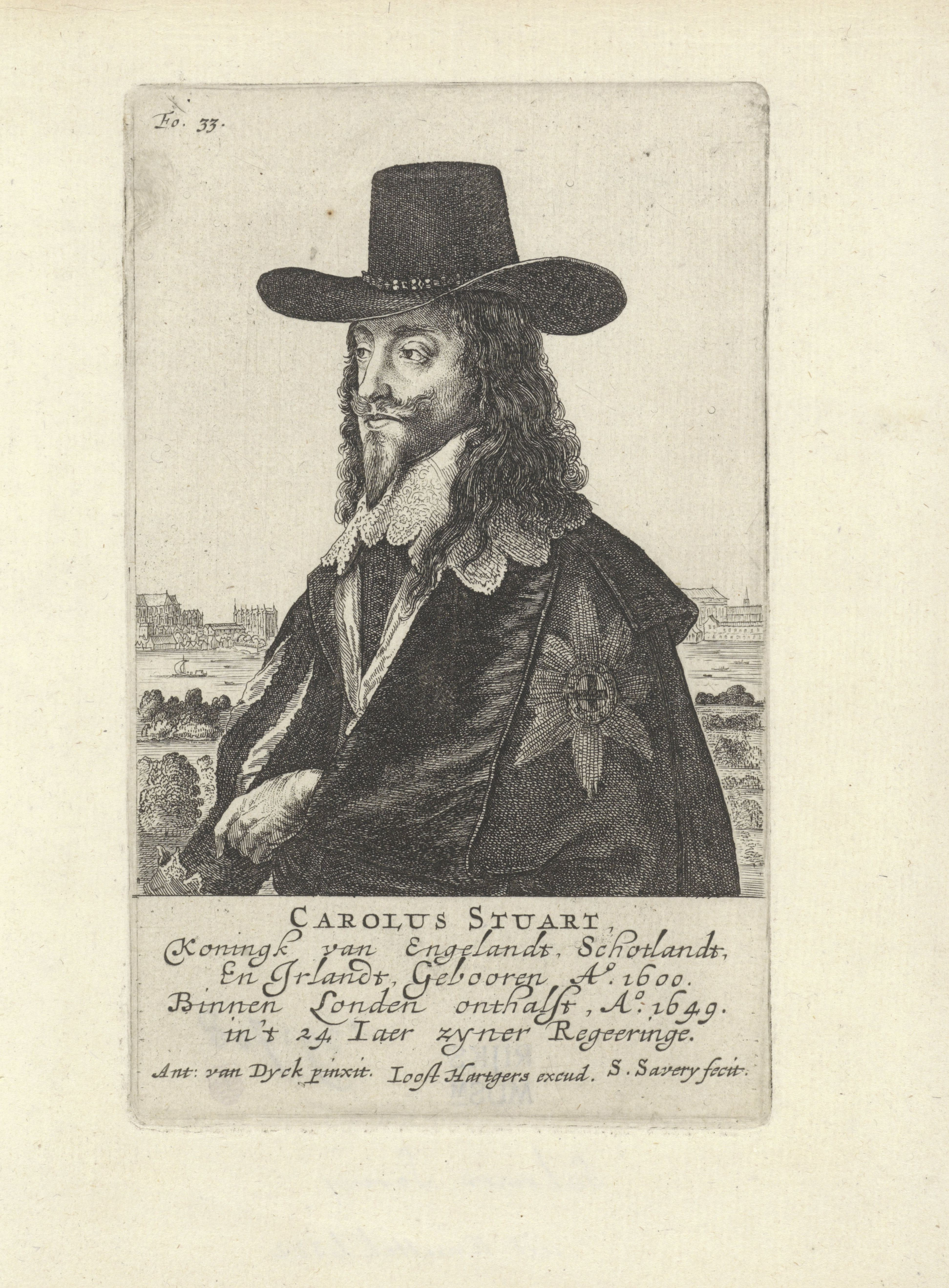
Portrait of Charles I of England

Historical texts, including editions of the Eikōn Basilikē and writings on the English Civil War.
Accounts of the shipwreck of the Batavia (1648), one of the most notable works in his publishing program.
Descriptions of African coastal regions, e.g., Beschrijvinghe van ’t koningkrijck Congo, met het aenpalende landt Angola (1650).
TABULA GEOGRAPHICA, IN QVA PARADISUS, NEC NON REGIONES, UR=bes, oppida, et loca describuntur; quorum in Genesi mentio fit: Auct. D.R.M. Mathes. Geographische beschryvinge des Paradijs, oft Lusthofs Heden, metgaders der Landen, steden en plaetsen, der welcker vermelt word int boeck der Scheppinge. T’Amsterdam by Ioost Hartgers.

== See also ==
- Oost-Indische voyagien (1648) - Joost Hartgers collection
- Sammlung von sechs und zwanzig Schifffahrten in verschiedene Länder - Levinus Hulsius collection
- Great and Small Voyages - Theodor de Bry
