= George Amabile =

Canadian poet

George Amabile (born 29 May 1936) is a Canadian poet who lives in Winnipeg, Manitoba. His poetry, fiction and non-fiction have been published in Canada, the USA, Europe, South America, Australia and New Zealand in over a hundred anthologies, magazines, journals and periodicals.

He has published seven books. The Presence of Fire won the Canadian Authors' Association Silver Medal for Poetry; his long poem, Dur, placed third in the CBC Literary Competition for 1991; Popular Crime won first prize in the Sidney Booktown International Poetry Contest in February, 2000; and he is the subject of a special issue of Prairie Fire. From October 2000 to April 2001 he was Writer in Residence at the Winnipeg Public Library.

== Bibliography ==
- 1972: Blood Ties
- 1976: Open Country
- 1977: Flower and Song (in Xochitl, in Cuicatl) ISBN 0-919594-63-8
- 1981: Ideas of Shelter ISBN 0-88801-054-0
- 1982: The Presence of Fire ISBN 0-7710-0735-3
- 1995: Rumours of Paradise/Rumours of War ISBN 0-7710-0736-1
- 1996: Five-o'clock Shadows ISBN 0-921688-13-X
- 2001: Tasting the Dark ISBN 1-896239-77-3

== See also ==
- Canadian literature
- Canadian poetry
- List of Canadian poets
