= Michael Mirolla =

Canadian novelist, short story writer, poet and playwright

Michael Mirolla is a Canadian novelist, short story writer, poet and playwright who lives in Oakville, Ontario. Mirolla was awarded the Bressani Award for his novel Berlin in 2010 (Leapfrog Press). He has won the Bressani Award a total of three times.

In both 2009 and 2014, Mirolla served as a finalist judge for the Leapfrog Press Global Fiction Prize Contest, selecting Vickie Weaver's Billie Girl in 2009 and Gregory Hill's The Lonesome Trials of Johnny Riles in 2014.

His short story collection Paradise Island and Other Galaxies was shortlisted for the ReLit Award for short fiction in 2021.

== Early life and education ==
In 1952, Mirolla immigrated with his mother and brother from the town of Jelsi in Italy to Montreal, Canada at the age of four. He moved to Ontario in 1993 and lived in Toronto before moving to Oakville in 2012. Mirolla graduated from McGill University and completed a masters in creative writing at the University of British Columbia.

== Works ==
=== Novels ===
- Berlin (2008)
- The Facility (2010)
- The Ballad of Martin B. a novella (2011)
- The Giulio Metaphysics III (2013)
- Torp: the landlord, the husband, the wife and the lover (2016)

=== Short fiction ===
- The Formal Logic of Emotion (1992)
- Hothouse Loves & Other Tales (2007)
- Lessons in Relationship Dyads (2015)
- The Photographer in Search of Death (2017)
- Paradise Island and Other Galaxies (2020)

=== Poetry ===
- Poems (1973)
- Interstellar Distances (2009)
- Light and Time (2010)
- The House on 14th Avenue (2013)

=== Plays ===
- Gargoyles
- Snails
- A Revised Experiment
