= Association of Italian-Canadian Writers =

Canadian writers' group

The Association of Italian-Canadian Writers is a Canadian organization established in 1986 to promote the publications of Italian-Canadian authors.

== History ==
The Association of Italian-Canadian Writers (AICW) was founded in September, 1986, in Vancouver during a conference of Italian-Canadian authors at the Italian Cultural Centre. The founding members included: Antonio D'Alfonso, Pier Giorgio Di Cicco, Dino Minni, Mary di Michele, Dore Michelut, Genni Gunn, Pasquale Verdicchio, Marco Micone, Fulvio Caccia, and Joseph Pivato. From the beginning it included authors writing in English, French or Italian and some Italian dialects.

At this founding meeting Joseph Pivato was selected to be president of AICW (1986-1990) and was the editor of the AICW Newsletter from 1986 to 1996, and 2003-5, an important function since the AICW has members scattered across Canada and beyond. The newsletter was trilingual to reflect the working languages for the authors.

Since 1986, the AICW has held biennial conferences in a different city: Toronto (1988), Ottawa (1990), Montreal (1992), Winnipeg (1994), Toronto-Woodbridge (1996), Vancouver (1998), Montreal (2000), Toronto (2002), Udine, Italy (2004), Vancouver (2006), Toronto (2008), Atri, Italy (2010), Halifax (2012), Montreal (2014), and Padula, Italy (2016).

== Publications ==
The proceedings of the 1986 founding conference were published as Writers in Transition (1990), edited by C. Dino Minni and Anna Foschi Ciampolini. The 2000 Montreal conference proceedings appeared as The Dynamics of Cultural Exchange (2002), ed. Licia Canton. And the 2004 Udine conference proceedings were published as Shaping History: L'Identita Italo-Canadese nel Canada Anglofono (2005) eds. Anna Pia De Luca & Alessandra Ferraro. The 2012 Halifax conference and the 2014 Montreal conference papers were gathered in Writing Cultural Difference (2015), eds. Giulia De Gasperi, Maria Cristina Seccia, Licia Canton, and Michael Mirolla.

Other important publications include: Contrasts: Comparative Essays on Italian-Canadian Writing (1985 & 1991) ed. Joseph Pivato, which became a seminal work promoting ethnic minority writing in Canada.

Pivato also published, Echo: Essays on Other Literatures (1994 & 2003) and edited, The Anthology of Italian-Canadian Writing (1998). In order to promote the literary work of Italian-Canadian authors Pivato published the following monographs: F.G. Paci: Essays on His Works (2003), Mary di Michele: Essays on Her Works (2007), and Pier Giorgio DiCicco: Essays on His Works (2011).
