= François-Joseph Bressani =

Italian Jesuit missionary (1612–1672)

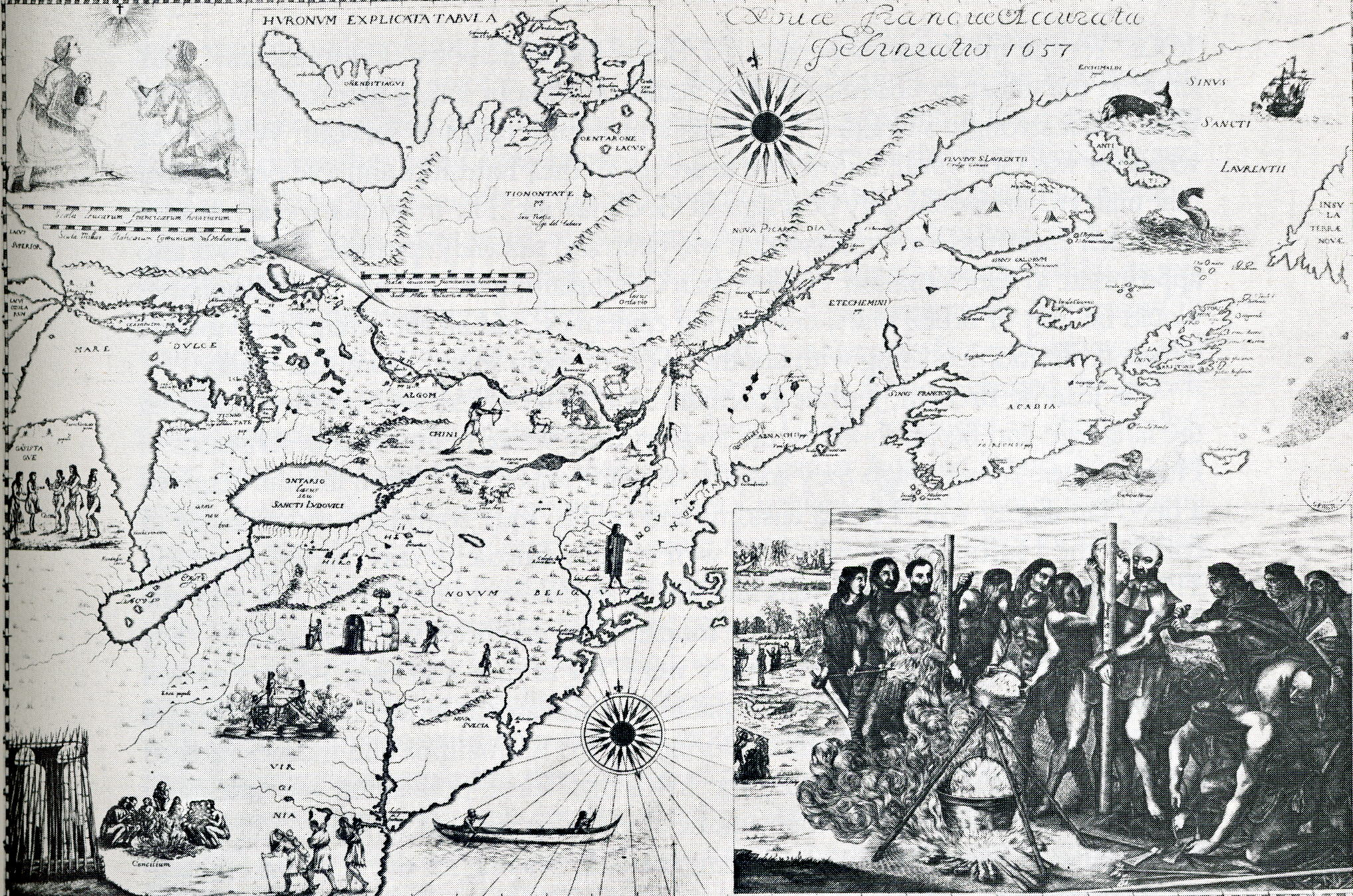
François-Joseph Bressani map of 1657 depicts the martyrdom of Jean de Brébeuf and Gabriel Lalemant

François-Joseph Bressani SJ (Francesco-Giuseppe) (6 May 1612 – 9 September 1672) was an Italian-born Jesuit priest who served as a missionary in New France between 1642 and 1650. At one point, he was captured by the Mohawk people and ritually tortured. Because of failing health, he returned to Italy, serving the church there.

== Life ==
Francesco Giuseppe Bressani was born in Rome, Italy on 6 May 1612. He entered the seminary and joined the Jesuit order 16 August 1626 and studied at Rome and Clermont. Prior to his ordination, he taught at Sezza, Tivoli, and Paris. His request to serve as a missionary in New France was granted in 1642.

Bressani arrived in North America in 1642 and was assigned to the spiritual care of the French at Quebec, where he was given training about the indigenous peoples he would encounter and started studying their languages. The following year was sent to the Algonquins at Trois-Rivières in present-day Quebec province. From there, he received permission to penetrate the interior to Wendat country.

En route, he and his companions were captured by Mohawk warriors near Fort Richelieu. They took Bressani to their village of Ossernenon about 9 miles west of the confluence of the Schoharie and Mohawk rivers in present-day New York. They ritually tortured and mutilated him, cutting off nine fingers. He was finally ransomed by Dutch traders from Fort Orange (Albany) and returned to France, where he arrived in November 1644.

Bressani quickly returned to Trois-Rivières and again served with the Huron missions. He was also stationed for a time in Québec, where he occasionally officiated Mass. His health failing, he retired to Italy in November 1650. He died in Florence on 9 September 1672.

When he prepared his history of the Jesuit missions in Canada, Bressani drew what is known as the François-Joseph Bressani map of 1657 to accompany it. The map depicts the martyrdom of Jean de Brébeuf and Gabriel Lalemant, as well as illustrations of daily Indian life. Bressani wrote his account of the Jesuit missions in Italian, Breve Relatione, published in 1653 in Italy.

== Legacy and honors ==
- The Italian Cultural Centre Society of Vancouver, British Columbia established the biennial F. G. Bressani Literary Prize in 1986 during the celebrations for Vancouver's Centennial.
