= Van Rensselaer (surname) =

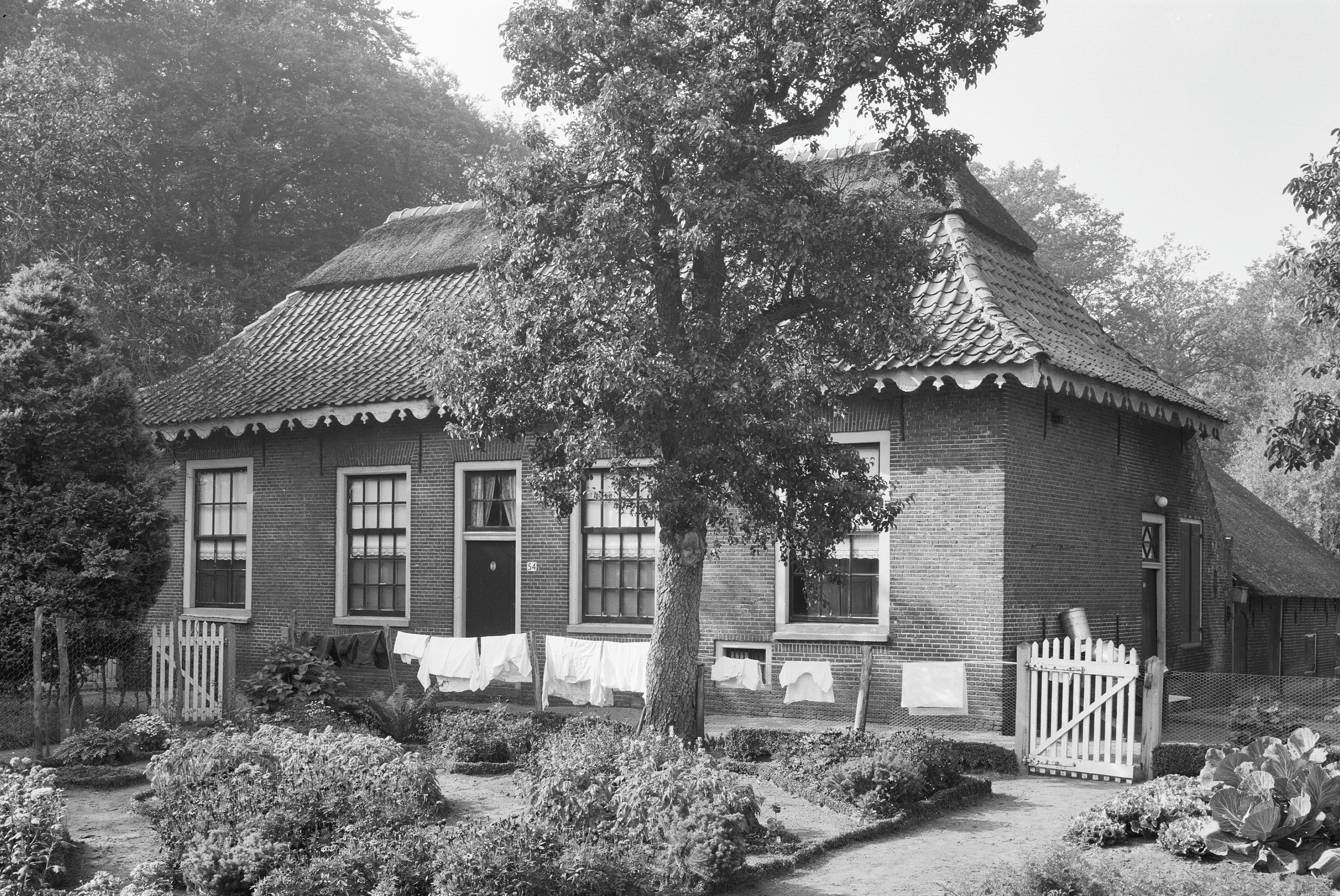
De Renselaar, Gelderland

Van Rensselaer is a toponymic surname of Dutch origin. It derives from the farmstead of De Renselaar, situated near Putten in Gelderland. Van is a preposition meaning "from" and is a common prefix in Dutch-language surnames. In Dutch, "van" following the first name is written with a lower-case "v"; in the United States it is usually capitalized, but individual usage should be followed.

== List of people with the surname Van Rensselaer ==
- Alexander Van Rensselaer (1850–1933), tennis player
- Charles W. Van Rensselaer (1823–1857), first officer on the SS Central America
- Cortlandt Van Rensselaer (1808–1860), Presbyterian clergyman.
- Hendrick van Rensselaer (1667–1740)
- Henry Bell Van Rensselaer (1810–1864), US Representative from New York, and Union Army general
- Henry K. Van Rensselaer (1744–1816), General in the American Revolution
- Jacob R. Van Rensselaer (1767–1835)
- James van Rensselaer (military figure) (1747–1827)
- James Van Rensselaer (1783-March 12, 1847), founder of Rensselaer, Indiana
- Jan Baptist van Rensselaer (1629–1678), third patroon of the Manor of Rensselaerswyck
- Jeremiah Van Rensselaer (1738–1810), US Representative from New York, and Lt. Gov. of New York
- Jeremias van Rensselaer (1632–1674), Director of Rensselaerwyck
- Jeremias Van Rensselaer (sixth patroon) (1705–1745), sixth patroon of the Manor of Rensselaerswyck
- Johan van Rensselaer (1625–1663), second patroon of the Manor of Rensselaerswyck
- John Sanders Van Rensselaer (1792–1868), lawyer and soldier
- Kiliaen van Rensselaer (fourth patroon) (d. 1687), fourth patroon of the Manor of Rensselaerswyck
- Kiliaen Van Rensselaer (fifth patroon) (1663–1719), fifth patroon of the Manor of Rensselaerswyck
- Kiliaen van Rensselaer (merchant) (1586–1643), one of the founders and directors of the Dutch West India Company
- Kiliaen van Rensselaer (colonel) (1717–1781), Colonel in the American Revolution
- Killian K. Van Rensselaer (1763–1845), US Representative from New York
- Margarita "Peggy" Schuyler Van Rensselaer (1758–1801), daughter of Gen. Philip Schuyler and wife of Stephen Van Rensselaer III
- Mariana Alley Griswold Van Rensselaer (1851–1934), critic, author
- Martha Van Rensselaer (1864–1932), founding director of Cornell University’s New York State College of Home Economics (now the New York State College of Human Ecology)
- Rev. Dr. Maunsell Van Rensselaer (1819–1900), first president of Deveaux College
- Nicholas Van Rensselaer (military figure) (1754–1848), Colonel in the Revolutionary War
- Nicholas van Rensselaer (minister) (1636–1678), New York Reformed Church clergy
- Philip Kiliaen van Rensselaer (1747–1798), storekeeper, military storekeeper and Commissary for the Northern Department
- Philip S. Van Rensselaer (1767–1824), Mayor of Albany, New York
- Robert Van Rensselaer (1740–1802), Brigadier General in American Revolution, New York politician
- Solomon Van Rensselaer (1774–1852), US Representative from New York
- Stephen van Rensselaer I (1707–1747), seventh Patroon and fourth Lord of the Manor
- Stephen van Rensselaer II (1742–1769), eighth Patroon and fifth Lord of the Manor
- Stephen Van Rensselaer III (1764–1839), ninth Patroon and sixth Lord of the Manor
- Stephen Van Rensselaer IV (1789–1868), tenth and last Patroon and seventh and last Lord of the Manor

== See also ==
- Van Rensselaer (family)
