= Kiliaen van Rensselaer =

Kiliaen or Killian (variations include Killiaen, Kilian, Kilean) van Rensselaer is the name of:

- Kiliaen van Rensselaer (merchant) (c. 1590–c. 1640), Dutch diamond merchant and first patroon of Rensselaerswyck
- Kiliaen van Rensselaer (fourth patroon) (born 1663), member of the New York General Assembly and fourth patroon of Rensselaerswyck
- Kiliaen Van Rensselaer (fifth patroon) (1663–1719), fifth patroon of Rensselaerswyck
- Kiliaen van Rensselaer (colonel) (1717–1781), colonel of the 4th Regiment, Albany County Militia
- Killian K. Van Rensselaer (1763–1845), member of the United States House of Representatives from New York
- Kiliaen Van Rensselaer (businessman), Founder and CEO of Insurrection Media
