= Johan van Rensselaer =

2nd Patroon of Rensselaerswyck
- Patroonship; 1643–1652
- Preceded by: Kiliaen van Rensselaer
- Succeeded by: Jan Baptist van Rensselaer

Personal details
- Born: 4 September 1625 Amsterdam, Netherlands
- Died: 6 May 1663 (aged 37) Amsterdam, Netherlands
- Spouse: Elizabeth van Twiller
- Children: Kiliaen van Rensselaer
- Parent(s): Kiliaen van Rensselaer; Hillegonda van Bylaer
- Relatives: See Van Rensselaer family
- Occupation: Merchant, Patroon

Johan van Rensselaer also Johannes van Rensselaer (Amsterdam, 4 September 1625 – Nijkerk, 6 May 1663), second patroon of the Manor of Rensselaerswyck, was the eldest son of Kiliaen van Rensselaer, and his only son by his first wife, Hillegonda van Bylaer.

== Life ==
Rensselaerswyck series
Dutch West India Company

The Patroon System

Map of Rensselaerswyck

Patroons of Rensselaerswyck:

Kiliaen van Rensselaer
(1630–1640s)
Various
(1640s–1652)
Jan Baptist van Rensselaer
(1652–1658)
Jeremias van Rensselaer
(1658–1674)
Kiliaen van Rensselaer
(1674–1687)
Kiliaen van Rensselaer
(1687–1719)
Jeremias van Rensselaer
(1719–1745)
Stephen van Rensselaer I
(1745–1747)
Stephen van Rensselaer II
(1747–1769)
Abraham Ten Broeck
(1769–1784, de facto)
Stephen van Rensselaer III
(1784–1839)

Being a minor of about nineteen years when his father died in 1643, the estates in Holland and at Rensselaerswyck were placed in charge of executors, Johan's first cousin Wouter van Twiller and Johan van Wely. The executors attempted to have Johannes confirmed as Patroon, but the partners prevented it. Van Twiller and Van Wely then appointed Brant Aertsz van Slichtenhorst as Director of Rensselaerwyck. Samuel Blommaert and Joannes de Laet tried to get more influence in the colony, as both owned one fifth and opened a legal case.

== Patroon ==
In 1650, when he was 25 years old, Johannes became head of the family. The States-General of the Netherlands decided in the same year that he was allowed to keep his title and call himself "patron" of Rensselaerswyck, and that the Patroon be more accountable to the shareholders. Among the papers of the New York Public Library is a letter from Johan Rensselaer, Patroon of Rensselaerwyck and his partners to the Burgomasters of Amsterdam seeking intervention to correct abuses by Governor Stuyvesant against the liberties of the colony, an apparent reference to the Governor's 1648 dispute with Van Slechtenhorst at Fort Orange.

Johannes never visited Rensselaerswyck. His brother Jan Baptist van Rensselaer and their 19-year-old brother Jeremias sailed from Amsterdam sometime after March 20, 1651, on the Gelderse Blom (Gelderland Flower) to organize the estate. With them travelled a dozen employees hired by the Patroon, recruited from places where the Van Rensselaers had other interests.

In 1656, the director general and council in New Amsterdam announced plans to begin collecting tithes, which heretofore had been collected by the patroonship for the support of the Dutch Reformed minister. Jan Baptist, as Director, submitted a remonstrance in which he pointed out that under the 1629 charter, Rensselaerwyck was exempt. The patron and his partners in Amsterdam lodged a protest, but the West India Company procrastinated until the English seized control in 1664.

== Personal life ==
In 1655 Johannes married his cousin Elizabeth van Twiller and they had two children:

- Kiliaen van Rensselaer, who became the fourth Patroon.
- Nella van Rensselaer, who married Johan de Swardt

Johan died on May 6, 1663, and his children went under the guardianship of their uncle Jan Baptist.
