= Hendrick van Rensselaer =

American landowner (1667–1740)

- Born: October 23, 1667; Watervliet, New York, British America
- Died: July 4, 1740 (aged 72); Albany, New York, British America
- Occupations: Public Officer, Land owner
- Known for: Director of the Eastern Manor
- Spouse: Catharina Van Brugh
- Parent(s): Jeremias van Rensselaer; Maria van Cortlandt van Rensselaer
- Relatives: See Van Rensselaer family

Rensselaerswyck series
Dutch West India Company

The Patroon System

Map of Rensselaerswyck

Patroons of Rensselaerswyck:

Kiliaen van Rensselaer
(1630–1640s)
Various
(1640s–1652)
Jan Baptist van Rensselaer
(1652–1658)
Jeremias van Rensselaer
(1658–1674)
Kiliaen van Rensselaer
(1674–1687)
Kiliaen van Rensselaer
(1687–1719)
Jeremias van Rensselaer
(1719–1745)
Stephen van Rensselaer I
(1745–1747)
Stephen van Rensselaer II
(1747–1769)
Abraham Ten Broeck
(1769–1784, de facto)
Stephen van Rensselaer III
(1784–1839)

Hendrick van Rensselaer (October 23, 1667 – July 4, 1740) was director of the Eastern patent of the Rensselaerswyck manor. The estate was composed of land in Columbia County, New York, and land opposite Albany, New York, on the Hudson River, named Greenbush (later Rensselaer, New York).

== Early life ==
Hendrick van Rensselaer was born in Watervliet, New York, the fourth child of Jeremias van Rensselaer (1632–1674) and Maria van Cortlandt van Rensselaer (1645-1689). His siblings included Kiliaen Van Rensselaer (1663–1719), second lord of Rensselaerswyck Manor, who married Maria Van Cortlandt, Johannes van Rensselaer, Anna van Rensselaer, (b. 1665), who married Kiliaen Van Rensselaer, their first cousin, and Maria van Rensselaer, who married Pieter Schuyler (1657–1724).

His paternal grandparents were Anna van Wely (1601-1670) and Kiliaen van Rensselaer, one of the founders and directors of the Dutch West India Company who was instrumental in the establishment of New Netherland.

His maternal grandparents were Olaff Stevensz van Cortlandt (c. 1615–1684) and Annetje Loockermans (1618-1684). His mother was the sister of Stephanus Van Cortlandt (1643-1700) and Jacobus Van Cortlandt (1658-1739), both of whom served as Mayor of New York City.

== Estate and career ==
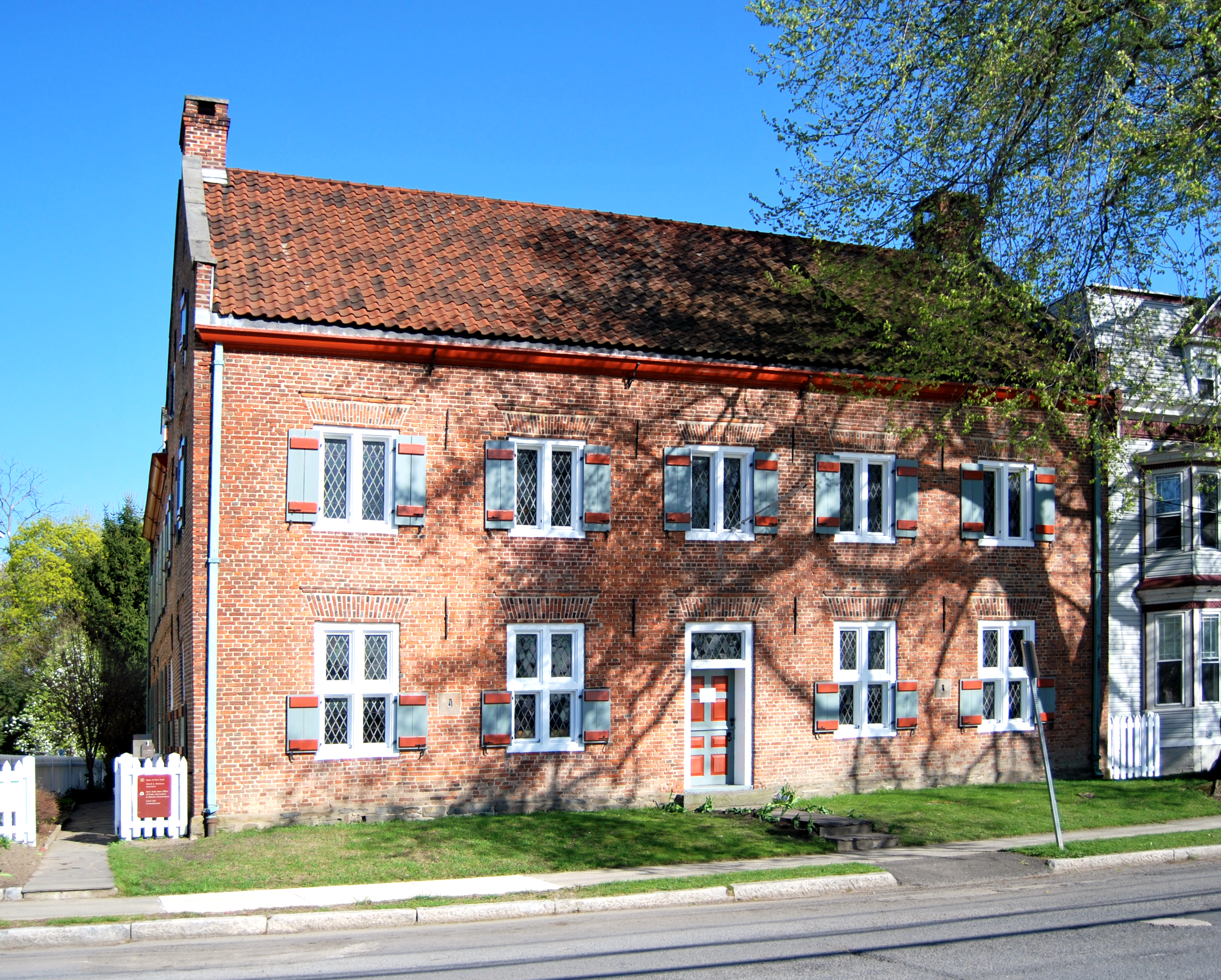
Fort Crailo

He received as his portion of his grandfather Kiliaen's estate, variously known as the "Eastern Manor" or "Greenbush." It covered about 62,000 acres of land in Columbia County, and encompassed lands south of Kinderhook, north of Livingston Manor and west to the Hudson River and was the "Lower Manor" to the "Upper Manor" of Rensselaerwyck. It was originally a part of Albany County, now Columbia County, New York. In addition, he received 1,500 acres out of the manor proper, opposite the city of Albany. Hendrick built a substantial brick house on the latter estate named Fort Crailo.

He was a merchant and ship owner who served the public as an alderman in the Albany assembly and on the Commission of Indian Affairs. In 1698 he bought from the Schaghticoke tribe a tract of six square miles on Hoosac River, for which he procured a patent. This purchase interfered greatly with the city of Albany. With van Rensselaer declining to sell his patent to the council, the controversy became a state affair. In 1699 the dispute was amicably settled, and he passed his patent over to the city.

== Personal life ==
On March 19, 1689, Hendrick married Catharina Van Brugh, the daughter of merchant Johannes Pieterse Van Brugh (1624–1697) and his wife, Catharine Roeloffe Jans (1629–1684). Her brother was Pieter Van Brugh (1666–1740), the Mayor of Albany, New York from 1699 to 1700 and from 1721 to 1723. Hendrick and Catharina had the following children:

- Maria Van Rensselaer (1689–1756), who married Samuel Ten Broeck (1680–1756), son of Dirck Wesselse Ten Broeck, in 1712.
- Catherine Van Rensselaer (1691–1770), who married Johannes Ten Broeck (1683–1765), another son of Dirck Wesselse Ten Broeck, in 1714.
- Anna Van Rensselaer (1696–1756), who married Peter Douw (grandparents of Peter Gansevoort and great-great-grandparents of Herman Melville), in 1717.
- Elizabeth Van Rensselaer (1700–1779), who married John Richard (d. 1763).
- Helena Van Rensselaer (1702–1792), who married Jacob Wendell (1702–1745).
- Jeremias Van Rensselaer (1705–1730)
- Johannes "John" Van Rensselaer (1707/08–1783), who married Engeltje "Angelica" Livingston (1698–1746/7). After her death, he married Gertrude Van Cortlandt.
- Hendrick van Rensselaer (1712–1763), who married Elizabeth van Brugh (1712–1753) in 1735. After her death, he married Alida Livingston (1716–1798), widow of Jacob Rutsen (1716–1753), in 1762.
- Kiliaen van Rensselaer (1717–1781), who married Ariantje "Harriet" Schuyler (1720–1763) in 1742. After her death, he married Maria Low in 1769.

Van Rensselaer died on July 4, 1740, in Albany, New York.

=== Descendants ===
In describing the Van Rensselaer family, historian author William L. Stone stated: "They consisted of eighteen males in 1776. During the war every adult, except two old men, and all minors, except four boys, bore arms in one or more battles during the Revolutionary struggle." George W. Schuyler later wrote in his Colonial New York, "... of the eighteen males, sixteen belonged to Hendrick Van Rensselaer's branch, and of these, five were of Kiliaen Van Rensselaer's family."

His son Johannes was a Colonel during the American Revolution, and was the primary heir to Crailo. Through this son, he was the grandfather of Catherine Van Rensselaer (1734–1803), who married Gen. Philip Schuyler (1733–1804) in 1755, Jeremiah van Rensselaer (1738–1810), Robert Van Rensselaer (1740–1802), Henry van Rensselaer (ca 1742–1813), James van Rensselaer (1747–1827), a captain and aide-de-camp of Maj. Gen. Montgomery who fought in the Canadian campaign of Fort Chambly in Quebec and was Captain in the 2nd New York Regiment under Colonel James Clinton and later aide-de-camp of General Philip Schuyler.

Through his grandson, Robert Van Rensselaer, he was the great-grandfather of Jacob R. Van Rensselaer (1767–1835), a lawyer and federalist politician.

His youngest son, Kiliaen van Rensselaer (1717–1781), was commissioned as a Colonel of the 4th Regiment, Albany County Militia, Rensselaerswyck battalion, on October 20, 1775, and was the representative for Rensselaerswyck on the Albany Committee of Correspondence when hostilities broke out in 1775. Kiliaen was wounded during the Battles of Saratoga and received the highest compliments about his courage from General George Washington. Through this son, he was the grandfather of Henry K. Van Rensselaer (1744–1816), a general in the Revolution, Philip Kiliaen van Rensselaer (1747–1798), a colonel in the Revolution, Nicholas van Rensselaer (1754–1848), a Colonel and aide-de-camp under General Philip Schuyler,(Nicolas van Rensselaer was also related to Edmond-Charles Genêt); Killian K. Van Rensselaer (1763–1845), US Representative from New York.

== See also ==
- Van Rensselaer family
