= Patroon (disambiguation) =

In the United States, a Patroon (from Dutch patroon, owner or head of a company) was a landholder with manorial rights to large tracts of land in the 17th century Dutch colony of New Netherland in North America (notably along the Hudson River in New York).

In Flemish a patroon is an employer. The word is slightly antiquated.

Patroon may also refer to:

== People ==
- Kiliaen van Rensselaer (fourth patroon of Rensselaerswyck)
- Kiliaen van Rensselaer (fifth patroon of Rensselaerswyck)
- Jeremias van Rensselaer (sixth patroon of Rensselaerswyck)

== Places ==
- Patroon Creek, a tributary of the Hudson River
- Patroon Island Bridge, in Albany, New York
- Patroon Agent's House and Office, in Rensselaer County, New York

== Other ==
- USS Patroon (1859)
- Albany Patroons, a former professional basketball team
