= Nicholas van Rensselaer =

Nicholas Van Rensselaer may refer to:

- Nicholas van Rensselaer (minister) (1636–1678), Reformed Church clergyman
- Nicholas van Rensselaer (military figure) (1754–1848), American Revolutionary War officer
