= Stephen Van Rensselaer (disambiguation) =

Stephen Van Rensselaer is the name of:

- Stephen van Rensselaer I (1707–1747), eighth patroon of Rensselaerswyck
- Stephen van Rensselaer II (1742–1769), ninth patroon of Rensselaerswyck
- Stephen Van Rensselaer (1764–1839), eleventh (and last) patroon of Rensselaerswyck and member of the United States House of Representatives from New York
- Stephen Van Rensselaer IV (1789–1868), owner of the "West Manor" of Rensselaerswyck upon his father's death
