= Henry van Rensselaer (disambiguation) =

Henry Bell Van Rensselaer (1810–1864) was a U.S. representative from New York and Union Army general.

Henry van Rensselaer may also refer to:

- Hendrick van Rensselaer (1667–1740), director of the Claverack patent of the Rensselaerswyck manor
- Henry K. Van Rensselaer (1744–1816), colonel in the American Revolution

== See also ==
- Van Rensselaer (surname)
