= Van Rensselaer =

Van Rensselaer may refer to:

- Van Rensselaer family, a prominent Dutch American family
- Van Rensselaer (surname), a surname (including a list of people with the name)
- Van Rensselaer Island, an island in the Hudson River opposite the city of Albany, New York, United States
- Van Rensselaer Lower Manor House, Claverack, New York, United States
- Van Rensselaer Hall, a dormitory for women at Drexel University
- Martha Van Rensselaer Hall, a building of Cornell University College of Human Ecology

== See also ==
- Van Rensselaer Richmond (1812–1883), New York civil engineer and politician
- Rensselaer (disambiguation)
- Rensselaerswyck
- Van Rensselaer's Regiment
- Edgar Van Ranseleer, a character in Archie Bunker's Place
