= Philip van Rensselaer =

Philip or Phillip van Rensselaer may refer to the following members of the New York family:

- Philip Kiliaen van Rensselaer (1747–1798), merchant
- Philip S. Van Rensselaer (1767–1824), mayor

== See also ==
- Van Rensselaer (disambiguation)
