= Van Rensselaer family =

Family of Dutch and New York patroons

Van Rensselaer
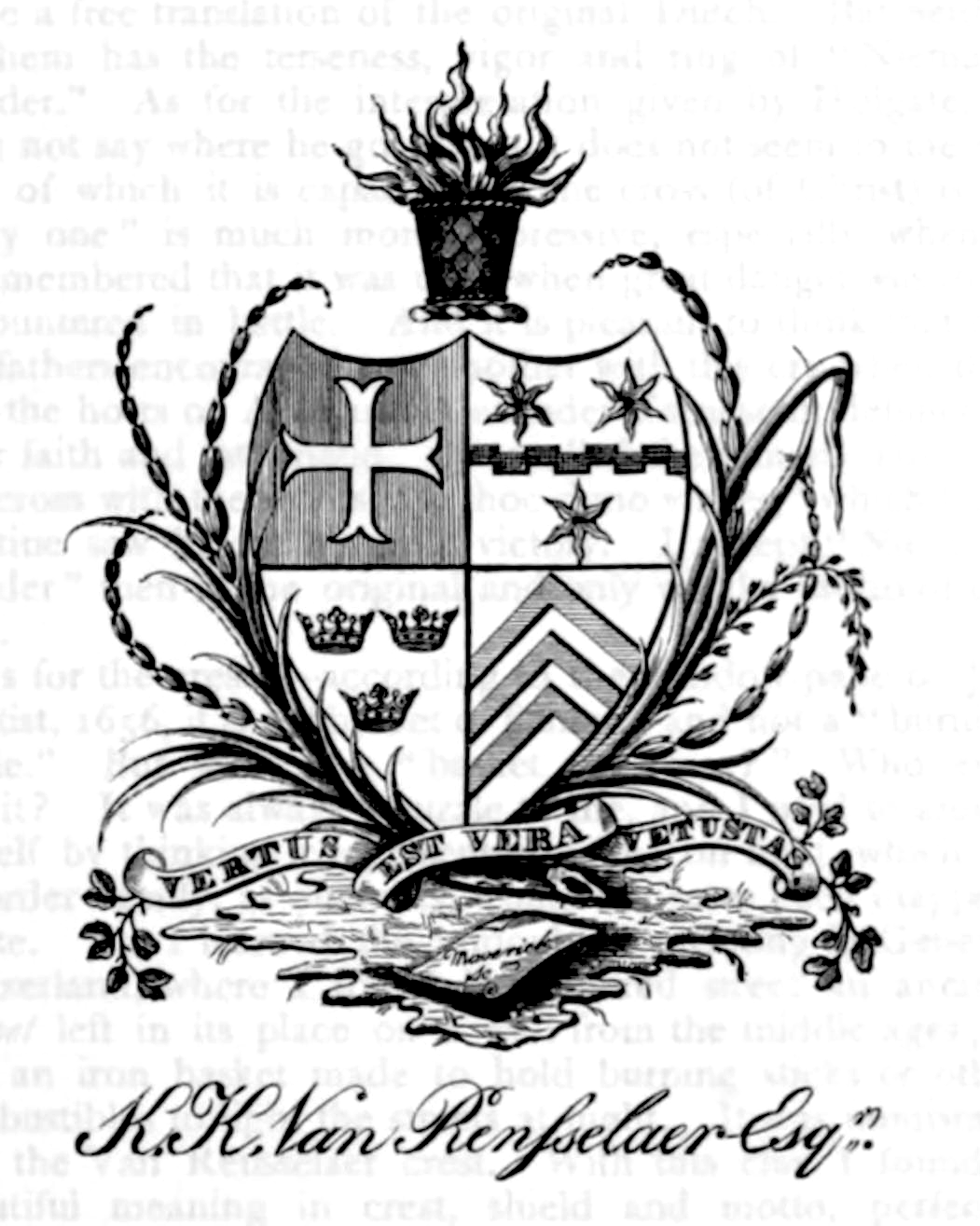
- Bookplate of Killian K. Van Rensselaer, showing the arms of the family
- Country: United States
- Etymology: Derived from De Renselaar, a farmstead in Gelderland
- Origin: Netherlands
- Connected families: Bayard family Livingston family Schuyler family Van Cortlandt family
- Motto: VERTUS EST VERA VETUSTAS (Latin for "Virtue is true antiquity")
- Estates: Fort Crailo; Manor of Rensselaerswyck; Jacob Van Rensselaer House

Rensselaerswyck series
Dutch West India Company

The Patroon System

Map of Rensselaerswyck

Patroons of Rensselaerswyck:

Kiliaen van Rensselaer
(1630–1640s)
Various
(1640s–1652)
Jan Baptist van Rensselaer
(1652–1658)
Jeremias van Rensselaer
(1658–1674)
Kiliaen van Rensselaer
(1674–1687)
Kiliaen van Rensselaer
(1687–1719)
Jeremias van Rensselaer
(1719–1745)
Stephen van Rensselaer I
(1745–1747)
Stephen van Rensselaer II
(1747–1769)
Abraham Ten Broeck
(1769–1784, de facto)
Stephen van Rensselaer III
(1784–1839)

The Van Rensselaer family (/ˈrɛnslər, -slɪər/) is a family of Dutch descent that was prominent during the 17th, 18th, and 19th centuries in the area now known as the state of New York. Members of this family played a critical role in the formation of the United States and served as leaders in business, politics and society.

== History ==
The Van Rensselaers were of Dutch origin, and the family originally migrated from the Netherlands to a large area along the Hudson River in the present-day area of Albany, New York. The Van Rensselaers and other patroons named this young colony New Netherland. Many members of the family were active in politics and in the military. They are best known for the Rensselaerswyck estate of roughly a million acres, which although broken up by the Anti-Rent Revolt in the 1840s, had long cemented the Van Rensselaer family as one of the wealthiest in early America.

Herman Melville, a descendant of the Van Rensselaer family, mentioned them in the first chapter of his novel Moby-Dick: "It touches one's sense of honor, particularly if you come of an old established family in the land, the Van Rensselaers, or Randolphs, or Hardicanutes." Edith Wharton, a Van Rensselaer cousin, is said to have based the Van der Luydens in The Age of Innocence on the Van Rensselaers.

== Patroons of Rensselaerswyck ==
- Kiliaen Van Rensselaer (1586–1643), first Patroon of Rensselaerswyck
- Johannes Van Rensselaer (1625–1663), second Patroon
- Jan Baptist van Rensselaer (1629–1678), Director of Rensselaerwyck from 1652 to 1658 and third Patroon

== Lords of the Manor of Rensselaerswyck ==
- Kiliaen Van Rensselaer (died 1687), son of Johan, fourth Patroon and first Lord of the manor of Rensselaerswyck
- Kiliaen Van Rensselaer (1663–1719), son of Jeremias, fifth Patroon and second Lord of the manor
- Jeremias Van Rensselaer (1705–1743), son of Kiliaen, sixth Patroon and third Lord of the manor
- Stephen van Rensselaer I (1707–1747), son of Kiliaen, brother of Jeremias, seventh Patroon and fourth Lord of the manor
- Stephen van Rensselaer II (1742–1769), son of Stephen, eighth Patroon and fifth Lord of the manor
- Stephen Van Rensselaer III (1764–1839), US Representative from New York and Lt. Gov. of New York, founder and namesake of Rensselaer Polytechnic Institute, son of Stephen II, ninth Patroon and sixth Lord of the manor
- Stephen Van Rensselaer IV (1789–1868), son of Stephen III, tenth and last Patroon and seventh and last Lord of the manor

== Members ==
Van Rensselaer family members
- Hendrick van Rensselaer (d. 1602) ⚭ Maria Pafraet
  - Maria van Rensselaer ⚭ Ryckaert van Twiller
    - Wouter van Twiller (1606–1654)
  - Kiliaen van Rensselaer (1586–1643) ⚭ (1) 1616: Hillegonda van Bijler (ca. 1598–1626); ⚭ (2) 1627: Anna van Wely (ca. 1601–1670)
    - Hendrick van Rensselaer (b. ca. 1620)
    - Johan van Rensselaer (1625–1663) ⚭ 1655: Elizabeth van Twiller
      - Kiliaen van Rensselaer (died 1687) ⚭ Anna van Rensselaer (b. 1665)
      - Nella van Rensselaer
    - Maria van Rensselaer (d. 1627)
    - Jan Baptist van Rensselaer (1629–1678) ⚭ Susanna van Wely
    - Maria van Rensselaer (1631–1654)
    - Jeremias van Rensselaer (1632–1674) ⚭ 1662: Maria van Cortlandt (1645–1689)
      - Kiliaen Van Rensselaer (1663–1719) ⚭ 1701: Maria Van Cortlandt (1674/80–1747/50); After van Rensselaer died in 1719, Maria Van Cortlandt ⚭ 1728: John Milne.
        - Jeremias Van Rensselaer (1705–1745)
        - Stephen van Rensselaer I (1707–1747) ⚭ 1729: Elizabeth Groesbeck (1707–1756)
          - Elizabeth van Rensselaer (1734–1813) ⚭ 1763: Abraham Ten Broeck (1734–1810)
          - Stephen Van Rensselaer II (1742–1769) ⚭ 1764: Catherine Livingston (1745–1810); After van Rensselaer died in 1769, Catherine Livingston ⚭ 1775: Eilardus Westerlo (1738–1790).
            - Stephen Van Rensselaer III (1764–1839) ⚭ (1) 1783: Margarita Schuyler (1758–1801); ⚭ (2) 1802: Cornelia Paterson (1780–1844)
              - Stephen Van Rensselaer IV (1789–1868) ⚭ Harriet Bayard (1799–1875)
                - Margaret Schuyler Van Rensselaer (1819–1897) ⚭ (1) 1837 (div. 1851): John de Peyster Douw (1812–1901); ⚭ (2) Wilmot Johnson (1820–1899)
                - Cornelia Paterson Van Rensselaer (1823–1897) ⚭ Nathaniel Thayer Jr. (1808–1883)
                - Stephen Van Rensselaer V (1824–1861) ⚭ 1858: Annie Louise Wild in 1858
                - Catherine Van Rensselaer (1827–1909) ⚭ Nathaniel Berry (1811–1865)
                - Justine Van Rensselaer (1828–1912) ⚭ 1853: Dr. Howard Townsend (1823–1867)
                - Bayard Van Rensselaer (1833–1859) ⚭ Laura Reynolds (1830–1912)
                - Harriet Van Rensselaer (1838–1911) ⚭ John Schuyler Crosby (1839–1914)
                  - Stephen Van Rensselaer Crosby (1868–1959) ⚭ Henrietta Marion Grew (1872–1957)
                    - Henry Sturgis Crosby (1898–1929) ⚭ Mary Phelps Jacob (1891–1970)
                  - Angelica Schuyler Crosby (1872–1907) ⚭ John Brooks Henderson Jr. (1870–1923)
                - Eugene Van Rensselaer (1840–1925) ⚭ Sarah Boyd Pendleton (1846–1923)
              - Catherine Van Rensselaer (1803–1874) ⚭ Gouverneur Morris Wilkins (d. 1871)
              - William Paterson Van Rensselaer (1805–1872) ⚭ (1) 1833: Eliza Bayard Rogers (1811–1835); ⚭ (2) 1839: Sarah Rogers (1810–1887)
                - William Paterson Van Rensselaer (1835–1854)
                - Susan Bayard Van Rensselaer (1840–1863)
                - Cornelia Van Rensselaer (1841–1913) ⚭ 1862: John Erving (1833–1917)
                - Walter Stephen Van Rensselaer (1843–1865)
                - Kiliaen Van Rensselaer (1845–1905) ⚭ 1870: Olivia Phelps Atterbury (1848–1923)
                - Sarah Elizabeth Van Rensselaer (1847–1859)
                - Arthur Van Rensselaer (1848–1869)
                - Catherine Goodhue Van Rensselaer (1850–1929) ⚭ 1891: Rev. Anson Phelps Atterbury (1854–1931)
                - Eleanor Cecilia Van Rensselaer (1853–1926) 1887: Hamilton Rogers Fairfax (1852–1916)
                  - Katharine Van Rensselaer Fairfax (1888–1978) ⚭ Herbert Schuyler Cammann (1884–1965)
                    - Schuyler Van Rensselaer Cammann (1912–1991)
                    - Katharine Schuyler Cammann ⚭ Howard S. Lipson
                  - Hamilton Van Rensselaer Fairfax (1891–1955)
              - Philip Stephen Van Rensselaer (1806–1871) ⚭ Mary Rebecca Tallmadge (1817–1872)
              - Cortlandt Van Rensselaer (1808–1860) ⚭ 1836: Catherine Ledyard Cogswell
                - Alexander Van Rensselaer (1850–1933) ⚭ 1898: Sarah Drexel (1860–1929), widow of John Ruckman Fell (1858–1895).
              - Henry Bell Van Rensselaer (1810–1864) ⚭ 1833: Elizabeth Ray King
              - Cornelia Paterson Van Rensselaer (1812–1890) ⚭ 1847: Robert James Turnbull Jr. (1807–1854)
              - Alexander Van Rensselaer (1814–1878) ⚭ (1) 1851: Mary Howland; ⚭ (2) 1864 he married Louisa Barnewell
              - Euphemia White Van Rensselaer (1816–1888) ⚭ 1843: John Church Cruger (1807–1879)
                - Stephen Van Rensselaer Cruger (d. 1898) ⚭ Julia Grinnell Storrow (c. 1850–1920)
              - Westerlo Van Rensselaer (1820–1844)
            - Philip S. Van Rensselaer (1767–1824) ⚭ 1787: Anne Van Cortlandt (1766–1855)
            - Elizabeth Van Rensselaer (1768–1841) ⚭ (1) 1787: John Bradstreet Schuyler (1765–1795); ⚭ (2) 1799/1800: John Bleecker (1763–1833), widower of Jane Gilliland.
              - Catharine Westerlo Bleecker ⚭ Cornelius Van Rensselaer (1801–1871)
        - Jacobus Van Rensselaer (1713–1762)
        - Gertrude Van Rensselaer (born 1714) ⚭ (1) Adonis Schuyler; ⚭ (2) 1766: Robert Livingston (1708–1790)
        - Jan Baptist Van Rensselaer (1717–1763)
        - Anne Van Rensselaer (1719–1791) ⚭ John Schuyler (1708–1773)
      - Johannes van Rensselaer
      - Anna van Rensselaer (born 1665) ⚭ Kiliaen van Rensselaer (died 1687)
      - Hendrick van Rensselaer (1667–1740) ⚭ 1689: Catharina van Brugh (1665–1730)
        - Maria Van Rensselaer ⚭ Samuel Ten Broeck
        - Catherine Van Rensselaer (1691–1770) ⚭ 1714: Johannes Ten Broeck (1683–1765)
        - Anna Van Rensselaer (1696–1756) ⚭ 1717: Peter Douw (1692–1775)
          - Volkert P. Douw (1720–1801) ⚭ Anna De Peyster (1723–1794) (daughter of Johannes de Peyster III)
        - Elizabeth Van Rensselaer (1700–1779) ⚭ 1731: John Richard (died 1763)
        - Helena Van Rensselaer (1702–1792) ⚭ 1728: Jacob Wendell (1702–1745)
        - Jeremias Van Rensselaer (1705–1730)
        - Johannes Van Rensselaer (1707/08–1783) ⚭ (1) 1734: Angelica Livingston (1698–1746/47); ⚭ (2) Gertrude Van Cortlandt
          - Catherine Van Rensselaer (1734–1803) ⚭ 1755: Philip Schuyler (1733–1804)
            - Margarita "Peggy" Schuyler (1758–1801) ⚭ Stephen Van Rensselaer III (1764–1839)
          - Jeremiah Van Rensselaer (1738–1810) ⚭ (1) 1760: Judith Bayard; ⚭ 1764: Helena Lansing (1743–1795)
            - John Jeremias Van Rensselaer (1769–1828) ⚭ Catharine Glen (1765–1807)
              - John Jeremias Van Rensselaer (b. 1790), who died young
              - Jeremias Van Rensselaer (1796–1871) ⚭ (1) Charlotte Foster ⚭ (2) Annie F. Waddington
                - Jeremias Van Rensselaer (1824–1866) ⚭ Julia Jaudon
                  - Augustus Van Cortlandt Van Rensselaer
                  - Payton J. Van Rensselaer
                - Francis Van Rensselaer (1829–1871) ⚭ 1851: Anne G. Moore
                  - Glen Van Rensselaer (1867–1886)
              - Cornelius Van Rensselaer (1801–1871) ⚭ 1826: Catharine Westerlo Bleecker (granddaughter of S.V.R. II)
              - Visscher Van Rensselaer ⚭ 1866: Mary Augusta Miller
                - Cornelia Livingston Van Rensselaer (1879–1956) ⚭ Theodore Strong (1863–1928) (grandson of Theodore Strong)
          - Robert Van Rensselaer (1740–1802) ⚭ 1765: Cornelia Rutsen (1746/47–1790)
            - Jacob R. Van Rensselaer (1767–1835) ⚭ Cornelia de Peyster
            - Jeremiah Van Rensselaer (1769–1827) ⚭ Sybil Adeline Kane (1770–1828)
              - Cornelia Rutsen Van Rensselaer (1798–1823) ⚭ Francis Granger (1792–1868)
              - Alida Maria Van Rensselaer (1801–1832) ⚭ Charles H. Carroll (1794–1865)
            - James Van Rensselaer (1784–1847) ⚭ Susan De Lancey Cullen (1786–1863)
              - John Cullen Van Rensselaer (1812–1898) ⚭ Cornelia Josepha Codwise (1810–1890)
                - Mary Van Rensselaer (1839–1871) ⚭ Andrew K. Cogswell (1839–1900)
                - Schuyler Van Rensselaer (1845–1884) ⚭ 1873: Mariana Griswold (1851–1934)
                - Susan De Lancey Van Rensselaer (1851–1931)
          - Henry Van Rensselaer (1742–1813) ⚭ Rachel Douw (1745–1799) (daughter of Volkert P. Douw)
          - Maj. James Van Rensselaer (1747–1827) ⚭ (1) Catharine Van Cortlandt, ⚭ (2) 1789: Elsie Schuyler Bogert
            - John Van Rensselaer (1784–1870) ⚭ Elizabeth Van Cortlandt (1787–1868)
              - James Van Rensselaer (1812–1840) ⚭ Margaret Duxbury (1810–1879)
              - James Van Rensselaer ⚭ Margaret Rutgers Birch
                - Elizabeth Van Cortlandt Van Rensselaer (b. 1868) ⚭ Charles Boel (b. 1870)
                - Sarah Schuyler Van Rensselaer (b. 1870)
                - James Henry Van Rensselaer (b. 1872) ⚭ Florence N. Smillie
                - Marie Antoinette Van Rensselaer (b. 1874) ⚭ Fritz Unger
                - Margaret Rutgers Van Rensselaer (b. 1878) ⚭ Dr. Antonie Voislawsky
                - Rebecca Coffin Van Rensselaer (b. 1885) ⚭ 1913: Clarence B. Tippet
              - Stephen Van Cortlandt Van Rensselaer ⚭ Sarah Schuyler
                - Stephen Van Rensselaer, who died young.
              - Catharine Van Cortlandt Van Rensselaer ⚭ Gratz Van Rensselaer (b. 1834)
            - Angelica Van Rensselaer
            - Philip Schuyler Van Rensselaer (b. 1797) ⚭ Henrietta Ann Schuyler
              - Gratz Van Rensselaer (b. 1834) ⚭ Catharine Van Cortlandt Van Rensselaer
                - Philip Schuyler Van Rensselaer, who died unmarried
                - Cortlandt Schuyler Van Rensselaer (1859–1927) ⚭ 1891: Horace Macaulay
                  - Cortlandt Van Rensselaer (b. 1900)
                - Elizabeth Van Rensselaer ⚭ Dr. George L. Hull
                - Dr. John Van Rensselaer ⚭ Mary Johnston
                - Margaret Van Rensselaer
            - James Van Rensselaer, who died unmarried
        - Hendrick Van Rensselaer (1712–1793) ⚭ (1) 1735: Elizabeth van Brugh (1712–1753); ⚭ (2) 1762: Alida Livingston (1716–1798), widow of Jacob Rutsen (1716–1753).
        - Kiliaen Van Rensselaer (1717–1781) ⚭ (1) 1742: Ariantje "Harriet" Schuyler (1720–1763); ⚭ (2) 1769: Maria Low
          - Catharine Van Rensselaer (d. 1778) ⚭ 1771: William Henry Ludlow (1740–1803), no issue
          - Henry K. Van Rensselaer (1744–1816) ⚭ Alida Bratt
            - Henry H Van Rensselaer (1765–1795)
            - Kiliaen Van Rensselaer (1769–1859)
            - Solomon Van Rensselaer (1774–1852) ⚭ 1797: Harriet Van Rensselaer (1775–1840)
              - Harriet Maria Van Rensselaer (1815–1897) ⚭ Peter Edmund Elmendorf (1814–1881)
                - Harriet Van Rensselaer Elmendorf (1843–1921) ⚭ John Woolworth Gould (1839–1911)
                  - Edmund Westerlo Gould (1881–1907) ⚭ Elizabeth Tripp
                    - Edmund Elmendorf Gould
                    - Catharine Livingston Gould (b. 1905)
              - David Van Rensselaer (1797–1880)
                - Henry Kilian Van Rensselaer (1821–1897)
                  - Martha Van Rensselaer (1864–1932)
              - Catherine Van Rensselaer Bonney (1817–1891)
              - Rensselaer Van Rensselaer (1802-1850) ⚭ Mary Euphemia Forman Van Gaasbeck (1810-1881)
              - Matilda Fonda Van Rensselaer (1804-1863)
              - Margaretta Van Rensselaer (1810-1880)
            - John Van Rensselaer (b. 1779)
            - Kiliaen Van Rensselaer (1801–1881)
            - Stephen Van Rensselaer (1816–1833)
          - Philip Kiliaen van Rensselaer (1747–1798) ⚭ 1768: Mary Sanders (1749–1830)
            - Harriet Van Rensselaer (1775–1840) ⚭ 1797: Solomon Van Rensselaer (1774–1852)
          - Nicholas Van Rensselaer (1754–1848) ⚭ 1780: Elsie Van Buren (1759–1844)
          - Elsie Van Rensselaer (1758–1796) ⚭ 1774: Abraham Lansing (1752–1822)
          - Maria Van Rensselaer (1760–1841) ⚭ 1777: Leonard Gansevoort (1754–1834)
          - Killian K. Van Rensselaer (1763–1845) ⚭ 1791: Margaret Sanders (1764–1830)
            - John Sanders Van Rensselaer (1792–1868) ⚭ Ann Dunkin (1795–1845)
              - Maunsell Van Rensselaer (1819–1900) ⚭ Sarah Ann Taylor (1825–1906)
                - Caroline Matilda Van Rensselaer (1848–1941)
                - Maunsell Van Rensselaer (1859–1952) ⚭ Isabella Mason (1861–1955)
                  - Bernard Sanders Van Rensselaer (1886–1977) ⚭ Rose Tillotson (1887–1945)
                    - Henry Cammann Van Rensselaer (1920–2001)
                  - Arthur Mason Van Rensselaer (1888–1939)
                  - Maud Weyman Van Rensselaer (1889–1991)
                  - Alexander Taylor Mason Van Rensselaer (1892–1962)
                  - Kiliaen Maunsell Van Rensselaer (1898–1981)
                - James Taylor Van Rensselaer (1861–1944)
                - Bernard Sanders Van Rensselaer (1866–1870)
              - Charles W. van Rensselaer (1823–1857)
            - William Van Rensselaer (1794–1855)
            - Deborah Van Rensselaer (1795–1796)
            - Richard Van Rensselaer (1797–1880) ⚭ (1) Elizabeth Van Rensselaer (d. 1835) ⚭ (2) Matilda Fonda Van Rensselaer (d. 1863)
            - Bernard Sanders Van Rensselaer (1801–1879) ⚭ (1) Elizabeth Hum (d. 1834) ⚭ (2) ⚭ Mary Targee (d. 1858)
      - Maria van Rensselaer (1673–1713) ⚭ 1691: Pieter Schuyler (1657–1724), widower of Engeltie van Schaick (1659–1689).
    - Hillegonda van Rensselaer (1633–1654)
    - Leonora van Rensselaer (1635–1695?)
    - Nicholas van Rensselaer (1636–1678) ⚭ 1675: Alida Schuyler (1656–1727/29) (In 1679, Alida ⚭ Robert Livingston (1654–1728)).
    - Susanna van Rensselaer (1638–1680)
    - Ryckert van Rensselaer (1639–1692/95) ⚭ 1681: Anna van Beaumont

== See also ==
- East Randolph, New York — home to an extant branch of the family
- Van Rensselaer (surname)
- Manor of Rensselaerswyck
- Kiliaen Van Rensselaer (businessman)
- Daniel and Catherine Ketchum Cobblestone House
