= Renssalaer =

Renssalaer is a masculine given name. Notable people with the name include:

- Renssalaer William Foote (1815–1862), American army officer
- Thomas Van Renssalaer Gibbs (1855–1898), African American politician

== See also ==
- Rensselaer (disambiguation)
