= Jeremias van Rensselaer =

Dutch colonial governor

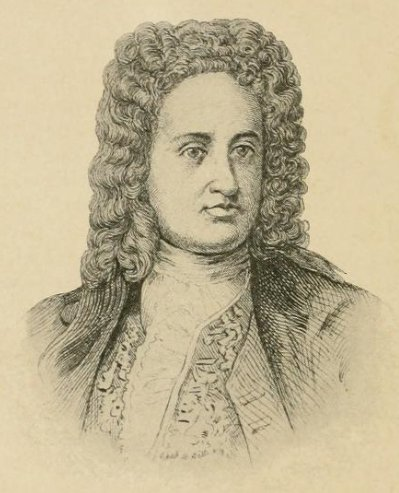
- Portrait of Jeremias van Rensselaer

Patroon of Rensselaerswyck Acting
- Patroonship; 1658–1674
- Preceded by: Jan Baptist van Rensselaer
- Succeeded by: Kiliaen van Rensselaer

Personal details
- Born: 16 May 1632 Amsterdam, Netherlands
- Died: October 12, 1674 (aged 42) Rensselaerswyck Manor, Province of New York, British America
- Spouse: Maria van Cortlandt (m. 1662)
- Children: Kiliaen van Rensselaer; Hendrick van Rensselaer
- Parent(s): Kiliaen van Rensselaer; Anna van Wely
- Relatives: See Van Rensselaer family
- Occupation: Merchant, Patroon
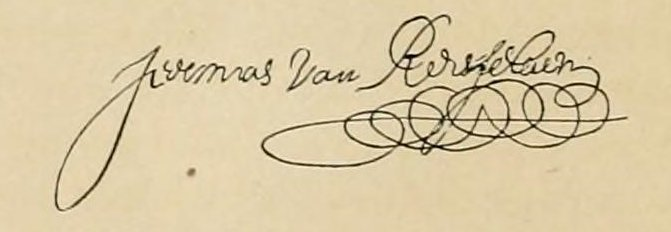
- Signature

Rensselaerswyck series
Dutch West India Company

The Patroon System

Map of Rensselaerswyck

Patroons of Rensselaerswyck:

Kiliaen van Rensselaer
(1630–1640s)
Various
(1640s–1652)
Jan Baptist van Rensselaer
(1652–1658)
Jeremias van Rensselaer
(1658–1674)
Kiliaen van Rensselaer
(1674–1687)
Kiliaen van Rensselaer
(1687–1719)
Jeremias van Rensselaer
(1719–1745)
Stephen van Rensselaer I
(1745–1747)
Stephen van Rensselaer II
(1747–1769)
Abraham Ten Broeck
(1769–1784, de facto)
Stephen van Rensselaer III
(1784–1839)

Jeremias van Rensselaer (Amsterdam, 16 May 1632 – October 12, 1674) was the third son of Kiliaen van Rensselaer, one of the founders and directors of the Dutch West India Company who was instrumental in the establishment of New Netherland and was the first patroon of the Manor of Rensselaerswyck. Jeremias van Rensselaer was the acting patroon of the Manor of Rensselaerswyck, and the first of his family to establish himself permanently in America.

== Early life and education ==
Jeremias van Rensselaer was born on May 16, 1632, in Amsterdam, the second son of Kiliaen van Rensselaer (1586–1643) and Anna van Wely (1601–1670), his father's second wife.

He grew up on the Keizersgracht, and received a Calvinist education. Among his siblings was older half-brother Johan van Rensselaer, the eldest son from his father's first wife Hillegonda van Bylaer, who eventually became the 2nd Patroon in 1643 upon their father's death. Another older brother, Jan Baptist van Rensselaer, the first son by Jeremias' father and mother, became the 3rd Patroon in 1652.

== New Netherlands ==
In 1654, he sailed from Amsterdam on the Gelderse Blom ("Gelderland Flower"), to the Dutch colony of New Netherland in the present day United States. He returned to Holland by the Beaver, on October 28, 1655, and sailed the second time from Amsterdam on the Gilded Otter, shortly after June 14, 1656.

In 1658, his older brother Jan Baptist returned to Amsterdam, and Jeremias succeeded him as Director of Rensselaerwyck on September 24, 1658. Jeremias was the first of his family to establish himself permanently in America, the remaining sixteen years of his life being devoted to the government of the colony.

=== Manor of Rensselaerswyck ===
Pursuing the policies begun under the vice-directors, he became a man of great influence among the Indians, and "so attached them to him that they guarded his estates as carefully as they did their own." To the French in Canada he was known as one of the representative and ablest men of the Dutch and English colonies. He had the good judgment to adjust the acute differences with Peter Stuyvesant (1612-1672) which had troubled the administrations of his brother and van Slichtenhorst, and during the brief residue of the Dutch authority in New Netherland was on excellent terms with the governor.

In 1661, eight chairs, a bed, a mirror and a cupboard were sent to him from the Dutch Republic.

In 1664, Jan Baptist, Elisabeth van Twiller, the widow of Johan, Leonora and Susanna decided to sell all their property in and around Rensselaerswijck to Jeremias. His younger brother Rijckert went to the colony to assist him.

On the occasion of the landtsdagh or diet summoned by Stuyvesant early in 1664 to deliberate on the critical condition of the province—this being the first general representative assembly held within the present state of New York—he served as presiding officer of that body.

=== Province of New York ===
After the surrender to the English in September 1664, he took the oath to the new government, and the rights and immunities enjoyed by his family in its colony were recognized, though the precise future status of the property was not settled in his time. He desired to obtain a new patent in the name of his family, and, failing in this, was privately advised to move in the matter as an individual (being qualified to hold real estate by virtue of his British citizenship), and so obtained a regrant of Rensselarswyck in his personal name. This counsel he rejected indignantly, saying he was but a coheir, and would not defraud his brothers and sisters. He finally obtained from Governor Andros a patent "to the heirs of Kiliaen van Rensselaer," which, while in a sense only provisional, served all necessary purposes until the manor grant of 1685.

=== Succession ===
As his nephew, Kiliaen van Rensselaer, was still a minor upon Jeremias' death in 1674, Jeremias' younger brother, Nicholas van Rensselaer, succeeded him as Director of Rensselaerwyck until his death in 1678 at which point Kiliaen (Jeremias' son-in-law) became the 4th Patroon.

== Personal life ==
On July 12, 1662, Jeremias married Marritje "Maria" van Cortlandt (1645–1689), daughter of Olaff Stevensz van Cortlandt and Annetje (née Loockermans) van Cortlandt. Maria was the sister of Stephanus van Cortlandt and Jacobus van Cortlandt, both of whom served as Mayor of New York City. Together Jeremias and Maria were the parents of seven children, including:

- Kiliaen van Rensselaer (1663–1719), who became the 5th patroon and 2nd Lord of Rensselaerswyck Manor in 1687. He married his first cousin, Maria van Cortlandt (daughter of Stephanus van Cortlandt), in 1701.
- Johannes van Rensselaer, who died without issue.
- Anna van Rensselaer (1665–1723), who married her first cousin, Kiliaen van Rensselaer, the 4th patroon. After his death in 1687, she married William Nicoll, the Speaker of the New York General Assembly.
- Hendrick van Rensselaer (1667–1740), who married Catharina van Brugh (1665–1730), daughter of prominent fur and timber trader Johannes Pieterse van Brugh, in 1689.
- Maria van Rensselaer (1673-1713), who married Pieter Schuyler (1657–1724), the 1st mayor of Albany and acting Governor of the Province of New York.

Jeremias died in Rensselaerswyck on October 12, 1674. He left a voluminous correspondence, together with a minute chronicle of events in America, under the title of the "New Netherland Mercury". His great industry and methodical habits have been remarked upon by many writers. His widow died in January 1689.
