= Rensselaer =

Rensselaer may refer to:

== Places ==
- Rensselaer, Indiana, a city
  - Rensselaer (Amtrak station), serving the city
- Rensselaer, Missouri, a village
- Rensselaer County, New York
- Rensselaer, New York, a city in Rensselaer County
  - Albany–Rensselaer station, Amtrak station serving the Albany, New York area.
- Rensselaer Falls, New York, a village in St. Lawrence County
- Rensselaerville, New York, a town in Albany County
- Manor of Rensselaerswyck, the Van Rensselaer family's estate during colonial times

== People ==
- Van Rensselaer (surname)
- Rensselaer R. Bigelow (1848–1907), justice of the Supreme Court of Nevada
- Rensselaer Morse Lewis (1820-1888), Wisconsin state legislator
- Rensselaer Nelson (1826-1904), U.S. federal judge
- Rensselaer Westerlo (1776–1851), U.S. Congressman from New York
- Bret Rensselaer, an American-born, British spy in the Bernard Samson novels

== Other ==
- Rensselaer Polytechnic Institute, a university in Troy, New York

== See also ==
- Van Rensselaer (disambiguation)
