= Beeren Island =

Island in New York

Coordinates: 42°28′00″N 73°47′10″W

Beeren Island (Beeren Eylandt in the original Dutch), also known as Barren Island or Bear Island, is an island in the Hudson River within the town of Coeymans, New York. It lies 11 miles (18 km) south of the city of Albany, and is at the border of four counties, Albany, Greene (to the south), Columbia (to the southeast), and Rensselaer (to the east). Beeren Island was once referred to as Mach-a-wa-meck, which may come from mashq (bear) and wamock (enough), meaning "place of many bears" and would make it in agreement with the Dutch name.

== History ==
The island was claimed by the Patroon Kiliaen van Rensselaer as the southern border of his patroonship of Rensselaerswijck, it was from the start of the New Netherland colony chosen as a fine site for fortifications to protect the patroon's lands. In 1643 a fort named Rensselaersstein was built and garrisoned, and included mounted cannon; Nicolaes Coorn was appointed watchmaster. Every ship passing the island had to lower its flag in deference to the patroon and pay five stivers. A dispute arose between Coorn and the captain of the ship Good Hope when Coorn demanded that Captain Govert Loockermans lower his flag, and Loockermans replied that "I lower my colors for no one except the Prince of Orange and the Lords my masters." At which point Coorn shot a cannonball through the mainsail of the Good Hope. The West India Company however refused to acknowledge the patroon's exclusive right over the river, this led to tension between the two until the English conquered the entire New Netherland colony in 1664. The island was the location of the first white child born along the Hudson River.

The island has at various times also been occupied by a few Native American hunters, by the Coeymans family, a quarantine station, and was even the site of fortune hunters looking for Captain Kidd's hidden treasure.
