= Nicholas van Rensselaer (minister) =

- Born: September 1636; Amsterdam, Netherlands
- Died: November 1678 (aged 42); Albany, Province of New York
- Spouse: Alida Schuyler (m. 1675)
- Parent(s): Kiliaen van Rensselaer; Anna van Wely
- Relatives: See Van Rensselaer family

Nicholas van Rensselaer (born in Amsterdam in September 1636 – died in Albany, New York, in November 1678) was a Reformed Dutch Church clergyman, and one time director of the Manor of Rensselaerwyck.

== Early life ==
He was the fourth son of Kiliaen van Rensselaer (1586–1643) and his second wife, Anna van Wely (1601–1670). His father was a Dutch diamond and pearl merchant from Amsterdam who was one of the founders and directors of the Dutch West India Company and was instrumental in the establishment of New Netherland and in 1630, became the first patroon of Rensselaerswyck.

His eldest sibling, and the only child to live to adulthood from his father's first marriage to Hillegonda van Bijler, was Johan van Rensselaer (1625–1663), his half-brother. Together, his parents had eight children, including Jan Baptist van Rensselaer (1629–1678), and Jeremias van Rensselaer (1632–1674).

Nicholas was liberally educated in Holland, and studied theology there until his studies were temporarily interrupted when the family sent him to apprentice with a spice merchant. In December 1657, he was with a cloth dealer, but returned to his studies six months later.

== Career ==
In Brussels, he met Charles II of England, who was then in exile. Claiming to have had a premonition, Van Rensselaer predicted that Charles would be restored to the throne. Van Rensselaer's family thought him half mad. He subsequently went to England as chaplain to the Dutch embassy, and the king, recognizing him and recollecting his prediction, gave him a gold snuff box with his likeness in the lid. Van Rensselaer was appointed chaplain to the Dutch ambassador.

After the Dutch ambassador left Great Britain, Van Rensselaer was licensed by Charles to preach to the Dutch congregation at Westminster, was ordained a deacon in the English church, and appointed lecturer at St Margaret Lothbury.

=== New Netherland ===
In 1674, after the end of the Third Anglo-Dutch War when Edmund Andros was commissioned governor of New Netherland, Van Rensselaer accompanied him to North America, bearing a letter of recommendation from the Duke of York, brother of Charles II who later became James II of England, in which he requested that Van Rensselaer be placed in charge of one of the Dutch churches in New York or Albany when there should be a vacancy.

He became colleague pastor of the church in Albany shortly after his arrival, and in September 1675, was invited by the governor to preach in the Dutch church in New York. However, the pastor, William Van Nieuwenhuysen, absented himself from the service, and forbade Van Rensselaer's baptizing any children that might be presented for that ordinance. Van Nieuwenhuysen rejected Van Rensselaer's ordination as not being in conformity with the order of the Dutch churches, nor with the terms of the treaty. In October 1675, the matter was resolved when Van Rensselaer promised to conform as a minister of the Dutch Reformed Church of Albany and Rensselaerwyck to the liturgy and discipline of the Reformed church of Holland.

=== Dispute with Leisler ===
On Sunday, August 13, 1676, Nicholas van Rensselaer preached a sermon in the meeting house of the Dutch Reformed Church in Albany. Jacob Leisler and Jacob Milborne took issue with the Dominie's (a pastor in the Dutch Reformed Church in the United States) remarks concerning original sin, and proceeded to criticize him for not being orthodox. Van Rensselaer complained to the Albany Court that in misrepresenting his sermons, Leisler had alienated the congregation and that the preaching and talents of the Dominie had been brought into contempt.

The Dominie was ordered to post a bond, and when he refused was order confined to his house. He then sent Stephanus Van Cortlandt, (the brother-in-law of his then deceased brother, Jeremias) to represent him before Governor Andros in New York. The Governor's Council ordered both sides to post bond. Leisler failed to furnish the bond that was required of him, a warrant was issued for his arrest, and the churches and people were thrown into a ferment. At last, a court was held at Albany before which Van Rensselaer and Nieuwenhuysen appeared with papers and witnesses. After a review of the whole case, they were told by order of the governor "to be reconciled according to Christian love and duty." The court ordered the parties to "forgive and forget," and that Leisler and Milborne pay the whole costs, since they gave occasion for the differences.

Van Rensselaer again resumed his charge, but a year later he was refused a seat among the elders. It was resolved that he have a suitable one behind the magistrates. In 1677, Nicholas van Rensselaer was removed from the ministry by Governor Andros.

=== Manor of Rensselaerwyck ===
In October 1674, when his brother Jeremias died, the new patroon, Kiliaen, the son of his eldest brother Johan, became the 4th patroon of Rensselaerwyck. As Kiliaen was a minor and was residing in Holland, Nicholas was made director of Rensselaerwyck. The Rensselaers in Holland hoped their brother's connections with the British royal family would help secure the patent for the Rensselaerwyck holdings. Nonetheless, this appointment caused some consternation among their American counterparts and the widow of Jeremias, Maria (van Cortlandt) van Rensselaer, became treasurer, and her brother, Stephanus, became bookkeeper.

== Personal life ==
In 1675, at age thirty-nine, he married nineteen-year-old Alida Schuyler (b. 1656), daughter of Philip Pieterse Schuyler. They had no children.

He died in November 1678, a month after the death of his older brother, Jan Baptist, in Amsterdam. Upon the death of Nicholas, Maria van Rensselaer managed the estate for her nephew, Kiliaen. After Kiliaen died in 1687 without issue, his cousin Kiliaen Van Rensselaer, Jeremias and Maria's eldest son, became the fifth patroon.

Nicholas' widow, Alida Schuyler van Rensselaer, married her late husband's secretary, Robert Livingston, who became the first Lord of Livingston Manor. Together, they had nine children, including Philip Livingston and Robert Livingston.
