= Kiliaen van Rensselaer (fourth patroon) =

(died 1687)

4th Patroon and 1st Lord of the Manor of Rensselaerswyck
- Hereditary lordship 1674–1687
- Preceded by: Jeremias Van Rensselaer (as Dutch Patroon)
- Succeeded by: Kiliaen van Rensselaer

Personal details
- Born: Amsterdam, Netherlands
- Died: February 22, 1687 Rensselaerswyck Manor, Province of New York, British America
- Spouse: Anna Van Rensselaer
- Parent(s): Johannes van Rensselaer; Elizabeth Van Twiller
- Relatives: See Van Rensselaer family
- Occupation: Merchant, Patroon

Rensselaerswyck series
Dutch West India Company

The Patroon System

Map of Rensselaerswyck

Patroons of Rensselaerswyck:

Kiliaen van Rensselaer
(1630–1640s)
Various
(1640s–1652)
Jan Baptist van Rensselaer
(1652–1658)
Jeremias van Rensselaer
(1658–1674)
Kiliaen van Rensselaer
(1674–1687)
Kiliaen van Rensselaer
(1687–1719)
Jeremias van Rensselaer
(1719–1745)
Stephen van Rensselaer I
(1745–1747)
Stephen van Rensselaer II
(1747–1769)
Abraham Ten Broeck
(1769–1784, de facto)
Stephen van Rensselaer III
(1784–1839)

Kiliaen van Rensselaer (died February 22, 1687), was the Lord and Patroon of Rensselaerswyck Manor.

== Life ==
Kiliaen van Rensselaer, who was born in Holland, was the eldest child of Johannes, and Elizabeth Van Twiller Van Rensselaer. When Kiliaen came of age, he travelled to Albany, and received naturalization papers from the English colonial government.

=== Manor of Rensselaerswyck ===
Upon the death of his uncle, Jeremias Van Rensselaer, in 1674, he became patroon of Rensselaerswyck. As he was still a minor the property was managed by his uncle, the Rev. Nicholas Van Rensselaer. Young Kiliaen's aunt, the widow of Jeremias, Maria Van Rensselaer, and her brother, Stephanus Van Cortlandt served in an advisory capacity.

While he was Patroon, the patroonship changed to an English lordship, and so was the first Lord of Rensselaerwyck.

== Personal life ==
He married a cousin, Anna, daughter of Jeremias and Maria (Van Cortlandt) Van Rensselaer.

=== Death and succession ===
Kiliaen died without issue at Watervliet, Albany county, about February 22, 1687.

He was succeeded by his cousin and brother-in-law, Kiliaen van Rensselaer, son of Jeremias van Rensselaer.
