= Jeremias van Rensselaer (sixth patroon) =

Dutch noble

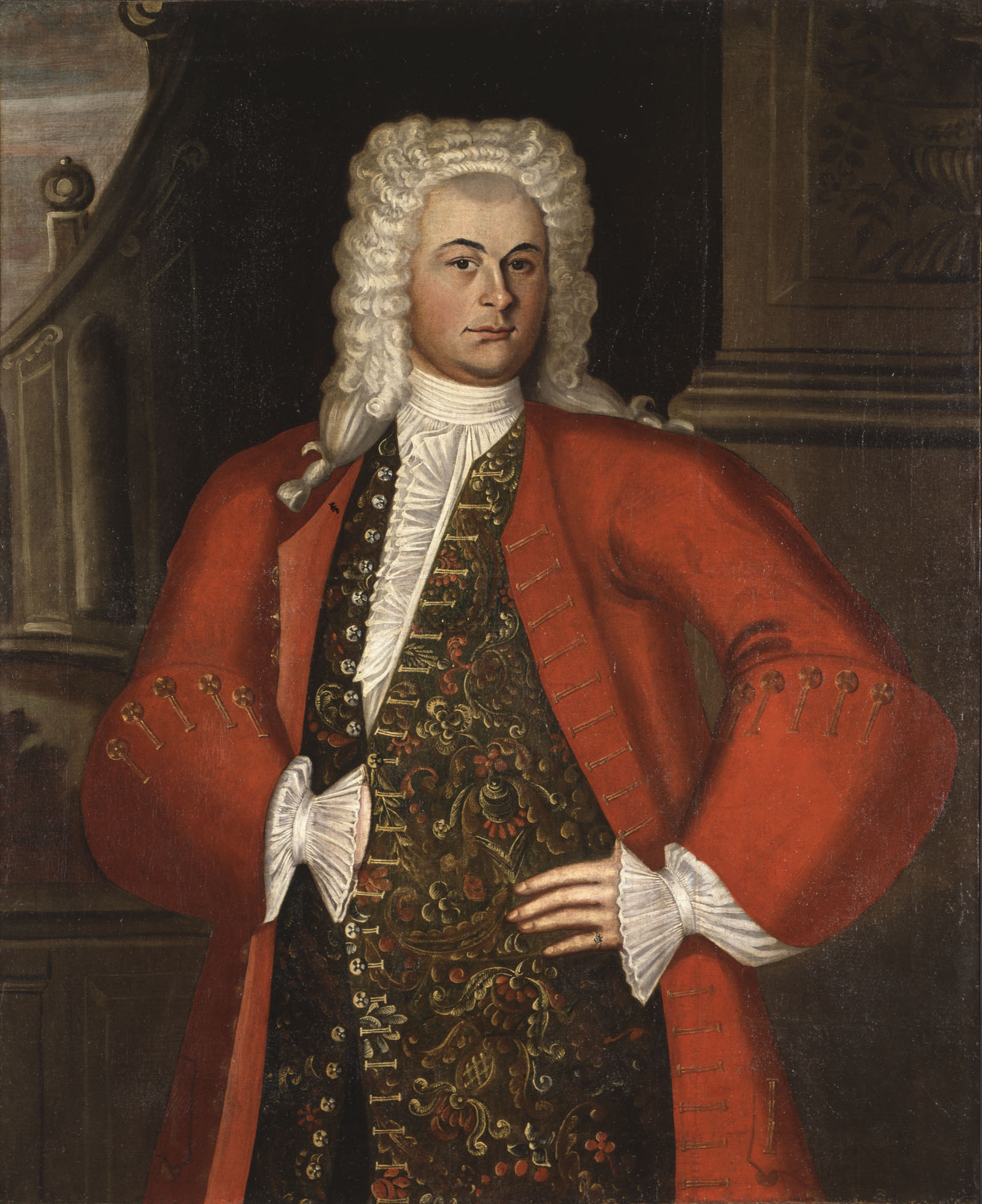
- portrait attributed to John Heaton (active 1730-1745)

6th Patroon and 3rd Lord of the Manor of Rensselaerswyck
- Hereditary lordship 1726–1745
- Preceded by: Kiliaen van Rensselaer
- Succeeded by: Stephen van Rensselaer I

Personal details
- Born: March 18, 1705 Manor of Rensselaerswyck, Province of New York, English America
- Died: 1745 (aged 39–40) Manor of Rensselaerswyck, Province of New York, British America
- Parent(s): Kiliaen van Rensselaer; Maria Van Cortlandt
- Relatives: See Van Rensselaer family
- Occupation: Patroon

Rensselaerswyck series
Dutch West India Company

The Patroon System

Map of Rensselaerswyck

Patroons of Rensselaerswyck:

Kiliaen van Rensselaer
(1630–1640s)
Various
(1640s–1652)
Jan Baptist van Rensselaer
(1652–1658)
Jeremias van Rensselaer
(1658–1674)
Kiliaen van Rensselaer
(1674–1687)
Kiliaen van Rensselaer
(1687–1719)
Jeremias van Rensselaer
(1719–1745)
Stephen van Rensselaer I
(1745–1747)
Stephen van Rensselaer II
(1747–1769)
Abraham Ten Broeck
(1769–1784, de facto)
Stephen van Rensselaer III
(1784–1839)

Jeremias van Rensselaer (March 18, 1705 – 1745) was the eldest son of Kiliaen van Rensselaer and Maria van Cortlandt.

== Manor of Rensselaerwyck ==
He was the sixth patroon of Rensselaerwyck from 1726 to 1745. He was also the third Lord of Rensselaerwyck.

Jeremias came of legal age in 1726, and was made Patroon, or third Lord of the Manor, and represented the Manor in the assembly from September, 1726, to September, 1743.

He was succeeded as Lord of Rensselaerwyck by his brother Stephen van Rensselaer, seventh patroon and fourth Lord of Rensselaerwyck.

== Personal life ==
He died unmarried and had no children.

== See also ==
- Van Rensselaer family
