= Stephen van Rensselaer II =

Dutch lord (1742–1769)

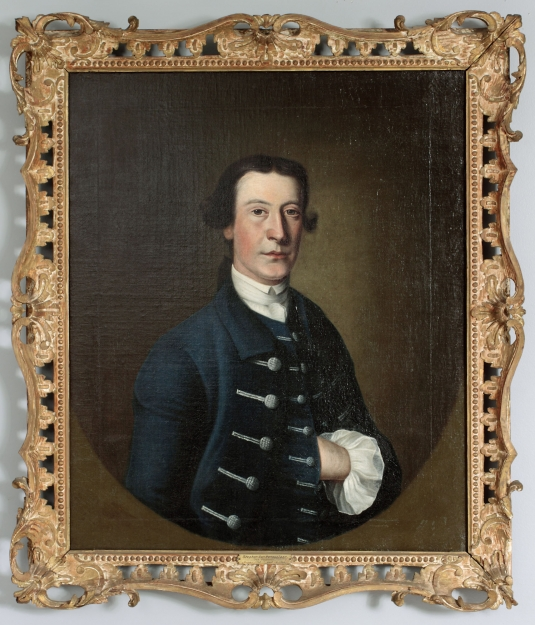

8th Patroon and 5th Lord of the Manor of Rensselaerswyck
- Hereditary lordship 1747–1769
- Preceded by: Stephen Van; Rensselaer I
- Succeeded by: Stephen Van Rensselaer III

Personal details
- Born: June 2, 1742 Manor of Rensselaerswyck, Province of New York
- Died: October 19, 1769 (aged 27) Manor of Rensselaerswyck, Province of New York
- Spouse: Catherine Livingston (m. 1764)
- Children: Stephen van Rensselaer III; Philip S. Van Rensselaer; Elizabeth Van Rensselaer
- Parent(s): Stephen Van Rensselaer I Elizabeth Groesbeck
- Relatives: See Van Rensselaer family
- Occupation: Patroon

Rensselaerswyck series
Dutch West India Company

The Patroon System

Map of Rensselaerswyck

Patroons of Rensselaerswyck:

Kiliaen van Rensselaer
(1630–1640s)
Various
(1640s–1652)
Jan Baptist van Rensselaer
(1652–1658)
Jeremias van Rensselaer
(1658–1674)
Kiliaen van Rensselaer
(1674–1687)
Kiliaen van Rensselaer
(1687–1719)
Jeremias van Rensselaer
(1719–1745)
Stephen van Rensselaer I
(1745–1747)
Stephen van Rensselaer II
(1747–1769)
Abraham Ten Broeck
(1769–1784, de facto)
Stephen van Rensselaer III
(1784–1839)

Stephen van Rensselaer II (June 2, 1742 – October 19, 1769) was the sixth and youngest child of Stephen van Rensselaer I and Elizabeth Groesbeck. He served as Lord of the Manor of Rensselaerswyck.

== Early life ==
Van Rensselaer was born on June 2, 1742. He was the sole-surviving son born to Elizabeth (née Groesbeck) Van Rensselaer and Stephen van Rensselaer I, who became patroon in 1745 upon the death of his older brother, Jeremias Van Rensselaer, who died unmarried and without issue. Young Stephen's older sister, Elizabeth van Rensselaer, was married to Abraham Ten Broeck.

His father was the second son of Maria (née Van Cortlandt) Van Rensselaer and Kiliaen van Rensselaer, who served briefly as Patroon and Lord of the Manor of Rensselaerswyck. His maternal grandparents were Stephanus Groesbeck and Elizabeth (née Lansing) Groesbeck.

== Career ==
As sole-surviving son, he inherited the Manor of Rensselaerwyck when he was 5 years old; upon his death, in 1769, the Manor was administered by his brother-in-law Abraham Ten Broeck (who also served as Mayor of Albany from 1779 to 1783 and, again, from 1796 to 1798) until his son, [Stephen van Rensselaer III], came of age, who served as the tenth Patroon of Rensselaerwyck from 1785 to 1839. At the age of twenty, Stephen II was commissioned a captain in the Albany County Militia.

Shortly after his 1764 marriage, he built the new Manor House in 1765, "from where he sought to rehabilitate the manor that had lacked active leadership since the death of his father almost two decades earlier."

== Personal life ==
In January 1764, he married Catherine Livingston (1745–1810), daughter of Philip Livingston, signer of the Declaration of Independence, and his wife Christina Ten Broeck (his older brother-in-law's sister), and had the following children:

- Stephen Van Rensselaer III (1764–1839), who became the ninth and last Patroon of Rensselaerwyck.
- Philip Schuyler Van Rensselaer (1767–1824), who served as Mayor of Albany, New York.
- Elizabeth Van Rensselaer (1768–1841), who married John Bradstreet Schuyler, son of Gen. Philip Schuyler, on May 18, 1787. After his death, she married John Bleecker in 1800.

Stephen Van Rensselaer II died in October 1769 at the age of twenty-seven. After his death, his widow remarried to Dutch born minister Eilardus Westerlo, with whom she had Rensselaer Westerlo, who was later elected to the United States Congress.

== See also ==
- Livingston family
