= Stephen van Rensselaer I =

Dutch lord (1706–1747)

Stephen Van Rensselaer I

7th Patroon and 4th Lord of the Manor of Rensselaerswyck
- Hereditary lordship 1745–1747
- Preceded by: Jeremias van Rensselaer
- Succeeded by: Stephen van Rensselaer II

Personal details
- Born: March 23, 1707 Manor of Rensselaerswyck, Province of New York
- Died: June 1747 (aged 40) Manor of Rensselaerswyck, Province of New York
- Spouse: Elizabeth Groesbeck
- Children: Elizabeth van Rensselaer; Stephen van Rensselaer II
- Parent(s): Kiliaen van Rensselaer; Maria Van Cortlandt
- Relatives: See Van Rensselaer family
- Occupation: Patroon

Rensselaerswyck series
Dutch West India Company

The Patroon System

Map of Rensselaerswyck

Patroons of Rensselaerswyck:

Kiliaen van Rensselaer
(1630–1640s)
Various
(1640s–1652)
Jan Baptist van Rensselaer
(1652–1658)
Jeremias van Rensselaer
(1658–1674)
Kiliaen van Rensselaer
(1674–1687)
Kiliaen van Rensselaer
(1687–1719)
Jeremias van Rensselaer
(1719–1745)
Stephen van Rensselaer I
(1745–1747)
Stephen van Rensselaer II
(1747–1769)
Abraham Ten Broeck
(1769–1784, de facto)
Stephen van Rensselaer III
(1784–1839)

Stephen van Rensselaer I (March 23, 1707 – June 1747), was the second son of Kiliaen van Rensselaer and Maria van Cortlandt, who served briefly as the 7th Patroon of the Manor of Rensselaerswyck and 4th Lord of the Manor.

== Life ==
Stephen van Rensselaer was born on March 23, 1707, and was the second son of Kiliaen van Rensselaer (1663–1719) and Maria van Cortlandt. He grew up in the family manor house, just north of Albany, New York.

== Manor of Rensselaerswyck ==
After the death of his brother, who did not marry and had no children, he became the seventh patroon of Rensselaerwyck and the fourth Lord of the Manor, serving from 1745 until his death in 1747.

== Personal life ==
He married Elizabeth Groesbeck on July 25, 1729, and had the following children:

- Elizabeth van Rensselaer (b. 1734), who married General Abraham Ten Broeck (1734–1810)
- Stephen van Rensselaer II (1742–1769), fifth Lord of Rensselaerwyck, who married Catherine Livingston (1745–1810)
- 4 other children

Upon the death of Stephen van Rensselaer II in 1769, his brother-in-law, Abraham Ten Broeck was named co-administrator of the Manor of Rensselaerswyck until 1785 when Stephen's son, Stephen Van Rensselaer III, came of age.

== See also ==
- Van Rensselaer family
- Van Cortlandt family
