= Kiliaen van Rensselaer (fifth patroon) =

Fifth Patroon of Rensselearwijk (1663–1719)

5th Patroon and 2nd Lord of the Manor of Rensselaerswyck
- Hereditary lordship 1687–1719
- Preceded by: Kiliaen van Rensselaer
- Succeeded by: Jeremias van Rensselaer

Personal details
- Born: August 24, 1663 Manor of Rensselaerswyck, New Netherland
- Died: 1719 (aged 55–56) Manor of Rensselaerswyck, Province of New York
- Spouse: Maria Van Cortlandt
- Children: 8, including Jeremias and Stephen
- Parent(s): Jeremias van Rensselaer; Maria van Cortlandt van Rensselaer
- Relatives: See Van Rensselaer family
- Occupation: Patroon

Rensselaerswyck series
Dutch West India Company

The Patroon System

Map of Rensselaerswyck

Patroons of Rensselaerswyck:

Kiliaen van Rensselaer
(1630–1640s)
Various
(1640s–1652)
Jan Baptist van Rensselaer
(1652–1658)
Jeremias van Rensselaer
(1658–1674)
Kiliaen van Rensselaer
(1674–1687)
Kiliaen van Rensselaer
(1687–1719)
Jeremias van Rensselaer
(1719–1745)
Stephen van Rensselaer I
(1745–1747)
Stephen van Rensselaer II
(1747–1769)
Abraham Ten Broeck
(1769–1784, de facto)
Stephen van Rensselaer III
(1784–1839)

Kiliaen van Rensselaer (August 24, 1663 – 1719), the eldest child of Jeremias and Maria van Cortlandt van Rensselaer was born in Rensselaerwyck.

== Life ==
He was patroon of Rensselaerwyck from 1687 to 1719, and second Lord of Manor of Rensselaerswyck. As the estate of his grandfather, Kiliaen van Rensselaer, the original patroon was yet held in common among the heirs, he negotiated a settlement with through his cousin Kiliaen of Amsterdam, son of Jan Baptist, whereby the heirs in Holland received the properties there, and the heirs in America received the American holdings.

In May 1704, Kiliaen received a new patent from Queen Anne for the Manor of Rensselaerwyck. The following month he signed over the 60,000 acre Lower Manor (Claverack) to his younger brother, Hendrick van Rensselaer (1667–1740).

He was a member of the New York governor's council from 1704 to his death in 1719, and also served as Commissioner of Indian Affairs.

== Family ==
On October 15, 1701, he married Maria Van Cortlandt, daughter of Stephanus and Gertrude (Schuyler) and had the following children:

- Maria van Rensselaer (b. 1702), who married Frederick van Cortlandt
- Gertrude van Rensselaer (1703–1704), who died young
- Jeremias van Rensselaer (1705–1745), sixth patroon and third Lord of the Manor of Rensselaerwyck, died unmarried and had no children
- Stephen van Rensselaer (1707–1747), seventh patroon and fourth Lord of the Manor, who married Elizabeth Groesbeck
- Johannes van Rensselaer (d. 1719)
- Gertrude van Rensselaer (b. 1714), who first married Adonijah "Adonis" Schuyler (1708–1763) of the New Jersey Schuyler family. After his death, she married Robert, third Lord of Livingston Manor
- John Baptist van Rensselaer (1717–1763), who died unmarried
- Anna van Rensselaer, who married John Schuyler (1710–1773), brother of Adonis Schuyler.

The family lived at the Manor House located on the flats along the Hudson, east of the river road, about a mile north of the center of the city of Albany.

He was succeeded as Lord of the Manor by his son, Jeremias van Rensselaer.
