= Kiliaen van Rensselaer (merchant) =

Dutch merchant (1586–1643)

1st Patroon of Rensselaerswyck
- Patroonship; 1630–1643
- Preceded by: Title created
- Succeeded by: Johan van Rensselaer

Personal details
- Born: 1586 (Note: The year of birth is at odds in sources. Some sources state c. 1585 (such as the Gilbert Genealogy and Encyclopædia Britannica), though others say c. 1580 (such as the Van Laer, p. 43), and still some say c. 1595 (such as Spooner and Encarta).) Hasselt, Dutch Republic
- Died: October 1643 (Note: The year of death is at odds in sources. Some say 1643 (such as Encyclopædia Britannica, the Gilbert Genealogy, the New York State Museum, and the New Netherland Institute), some say 1645 (such as Reynolds, p. 40; and Van Rensselaer, p. 2), while still others state 1646 (such as the Van Laer, p. 32; and Spooner, p. 11).) Amsterdam, Dutch Republic
- Spouses: Hillegonda van Bijler (m. 1616; died 1626) Anna van Wely (m. 1627)
- Children: 11, including Johan, Jan, Jeremias and Nicholas
- Parent: Hendrick van Rensselaer Maria Pafraet
- Occupation: Diamond and pearl merchant, patroon
- Known for: An original director of the Dutch West India Company, founding patroon of the Manor of Rensselaerswyck
- No portrait of Kiliaen van Rensselaer is known to exist.

Kiliaen van Rensselaer (Dutch pronunciation: [ˈkɪlijaːɱ vɑn ˈrɛnsəlaːr]; 1586 – buried 7 October 1643) was a Dutch diamond and pearl merchant from Amsterdam who was one of the founders and directors of the Dutch West India Company, being instrumental in the establishment of New Netherland.

He was one of the first patroons, but the only one to become successful. He founded the Manor of Rensselaerswyck in what is now mainly New York's Capital District. His estate remained throughout the Dutch and British colonial era and the American Revolution as a legal entity until the 1840s. Eventually, that came to an end during the Anti-Rent War.

Van Rensselaer was the son of Hendrick Wolter van Rensselaer, a soldier from Nijkerk in the States army of the duke of Upper Saxony, and Maria Pafraet, descendant of a well-known printers' dynasty. To keep from risking his life in the army like his father, he apprenticed under his uncle, a successful Amsterdam jeweler. He too became a successful jeweler and was one of the first subscribers to the Dutch West India Company upon its conception.

The concept of patroonships may have been Kiliaen van Rensselaer's; he was likely the leading proponent of the Charter of Freedoms and Exemptions, the document that established the patroon system. His patroonship became the most successful to exist, making full use of his business tactics and advantages, such as his connection to the Director of New Netherland, his confidantes at the West India Company, and his extended family members who were eager to immigrate to a better place to farm. Van Rensselaer married twice and had at least eleven children. When he died some time after 1642, two succeeded him as patroons of Rensselaerswyck.

Van Rensselaer had a marked effect on the history of the United States. The American Van Rensselaers all descend from Kiliaen's son Jeremias and the subsequent Van Rensselaer family is noted for being a very powerful and wealthy influence in the history of New York and the Northeastern United States, producing multiple state legislators, congressmen, and two lieutenant governors in New York.

== Early years ==
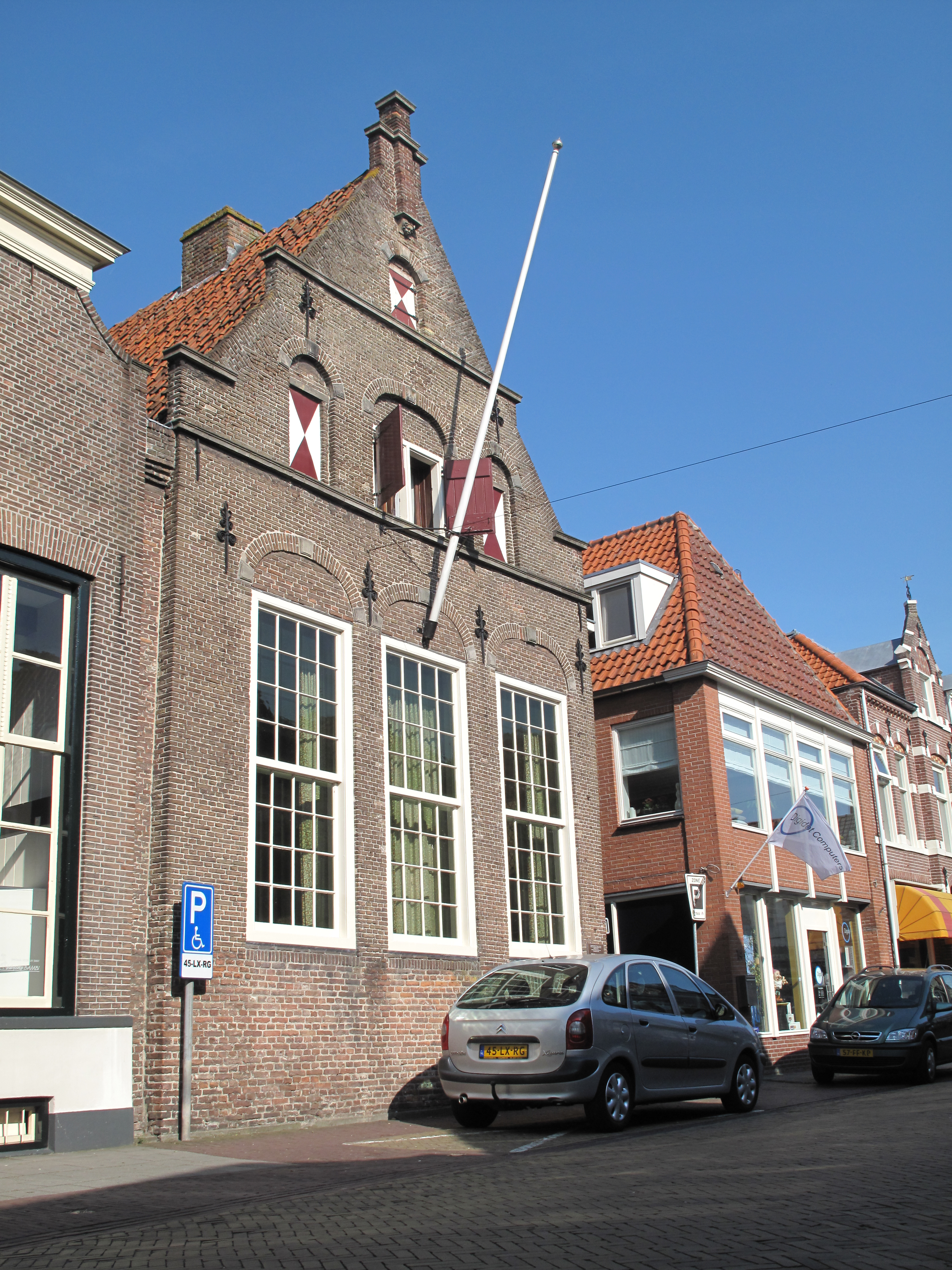
Birth house of Kiliaen van Rensselaer in Hasselt, Netherlands

Coat of arms of Kiliaen van Rensselaer

Kiliaen van Rensselaer was born in Hasselt, Overijssel, Netherlands in 1586. The exact day of his birth is unknown. He was the son of Hendrick van Rensselaer and Maria Pafraet. (Note: Sometimes spelled Pasraat.) His father was a captain in the Dutch army until his death at the siege of Ostend in early June 1602.

With his father usually not home (and eventually meeting his death) because of a military career, Van Rensselaer's mother sent him to apprentice with his uncle, Wolfert van Bijler, a jeweler and diamond merchant. At the time, the gem trade was a prosperous enterprise to join, being a well-developed craft. In those days, the diamond trade was nearly always combined with the trade in pearls, other articles of luxury, and rarities of every description. Dutch jewelers found a ready market for their valuable wares at the Dutch imperial court and the smaller German courts. This realm of work promoted Van Rensselaer to a life of economic success.

Much of Van Rensselaer's early life is unknown to today's historians, though in March 1608 it has been recorded that he was taking care of some business of Van Bijler in Prague. It seems Van Bijler gradually retired from his business, leaving it in the control of Van Rensselaer. During his tenure at the helm of his uncle's business, Van Rensselaer proposed a merger with the firm of Jan van Wely, (Note: First name sometimes spelled Johannes. Last name sometimes spelled Weely.) son of one of Van Bijler's sisters, who had an equally successful jewelry business. The firms combined under the name of Jan van Wely & Co. in February 1614. Van Rensselaer's name was not included in the name of the new company, since he contributed only one eighth of the investment capital, whereas van Wely contributed half (192,000 guilders).

In 1616, van Wely was called on by Prince Maurice to meet at The Hague for a sale in jewels. He was murdered while waiting to meet with the Prince. The firm's contract stipulated that at the death of Jan van Wely, the remaining members of the firm should continue the partnership for another six years. Van Wely's murder, therefore, caused no change in the business, but it seems that at the expiration of that time, Van Rensselaer began again on his own account, founding Kiliaen van Rensselaer & Co. with partner Jacques I'Hermite.

== Director of the Dutch West India Company ==
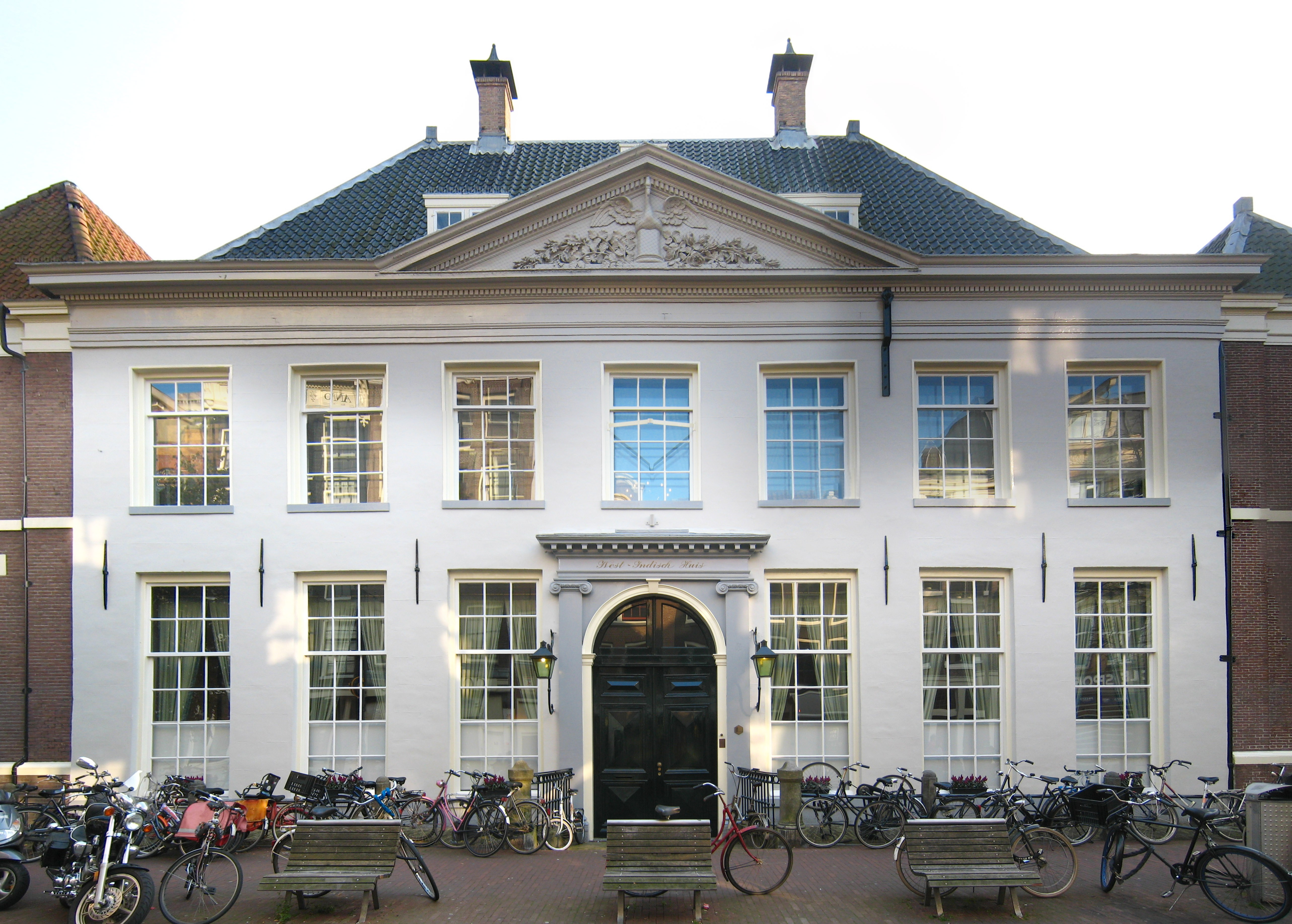
The West India House in Amsterdam, headquarters of the Dutch West India Company from 1623 to 1647

Some of Van Rensselaer's success as a jewel merchant came about due to trade made possible by the Dutch East India Company. The practical spirit of the Dutch merchant could not fail to recognize that the way to riches was through trade with the West Indies and Africa. During the Twelve Years' Truce, Dutch merchants had sailed unmolested to the West Indies but also received no letters of marque to take prizes from the enemy.

Before the Eighty Years' War began, people realized that the West Indies trade might bring great prosperity to the country and that more power might be developed against Spain. Rather than travel to the area singly on an armed ship or in the company of a few other vessels, traders could do business in the manner of the large and prosperous East India Company. A company for carrying on commerce in the West Indies and Africa could be organized, which might, like the sister company, act as the war-waging power in those parts and be supported by the treasury, ships, and troops of the United Netherlands.

After long years of preparation, the Charter of the Dutch West India Company was granted by the States General on 3 June 1621, and the subscription list was opened. It is known that subscriptions did not come in very rapidly at first due to the exclusion of the salt trade from the charter. This barrier was overcome in a later amendment to the Charter, and the subscription rate increased.

With a capital of seven million florins, the West India Company was granted exclusive authority and trade privileges in the Dutch possessions of the two Americas, as well as the coast of Africa from the Tropic of Cancer to the Cape of Good Hope. The objects of its creation were to establish an efficient and aggressive Atlantic maritime power in the struggle with Spain, as well as to colonize, develop, and rule the Dutch American dependencies — particularly New Netherland (the modern states of New York and New Jersey), discovered by Henry Hudson in 1609.

Van Rensselaer was one of the first subscribers to the West India Company. As with the other subscribers, he contributed 6000 guilders to be a member of one of its chambers. Having paid his way, he was welcomed to the Chamber of Amsterdam, one of five Chambers of the West India Company, each located in a principal Dutch city. The Chamber of Amsterdam was the largest with twenty members, mainly due to the city's population, and represented four ninths of the management of the West India Company.

Due to the practical limitations of meetings with 74 members on a regular basis (the total number of members from the five Chambers), the Charter called for a board of directors comprising nineteen members of the five Chambers. Van Rensselaer was chosen a member of this College of XIX, as it was called. It is said that care was exercised in the selection of the directors of each chamber, and only men of wealth and the highest known integrity were eligible for the trust. Van Rensselaer was apparently known as an unusually clear-headed man and an able and practical merchant who did not limit himself to his own branch of trade. These qualities presumably garnered the trust needed to be elected to the College of XIX.

In its role supporting colonization of New Netherland, the West India Company had an executive board of nine members from the College of XIX to manage the concerns of their colony. Van Rensselaer was also a member of this group. In the early career of the Company, he was one of its mainstays, placing several of his vessels at its disposal and twice advancing money to save its credit. His name is conspicuously identified with all its measures of policy, including the original settlement of Manhattan Island, New Amsterdam.

== Patroon ==
Rensselaerswyck series
Dutch West India Company

The Patroon System

Map of Rensselaerswyck

Patroons of Rensselaerswyck:

Kiliaen van Rensselaer
(1630–1640s)
Various
(1640s–1652)
Jan Baptist van Rensselaer
(1652–1658)
Jeremias van Rensselaer
(1658–1674)
Kiliaen van Rensselaer
(1674–1687)
Kiliaen van Rensselaer
(1687–1719)
Jeremias van Rensselaer
(1719–1745)
Stephen van Rensselaer I
(1745–1747)
Stephen van Rensselaer II
(1747–1769)
Abraham Ten Broeck
(1769–1784, de facto)
Stephen van Rensselaer III
(1784–1839)

Van Rensselaer's merchant's mark

Unfortunately for the West India Company, the infant colony of New Netherland languished. The Dutch Republic was economically thriving, causing the cautious Dutch people to show very little inclination to emigrate to wild and uncultivated lands in which no substantial inducements were present. While the economic situation of the colony in the late 1620s could be considered a relatively good showing for a colony only newly started in a wilderness, its slow success was hardly sufficient to create much excitement among the directors of the West India Company. Within a few years, the Company realized that special measures which would afford a stimulus to colonization were indispensable.

It was for these reasons that the Company proposed the Charter of Freedoms and Exemptions, which the States General ratified on 7 June 1629. This document was created to encourage settlement of New Netherland through the establishment of feudal patroonships purchased and supplied by members of the West India Company. With a total of 31 articles, the document spells out many requirements of these patroons, primarily stating that each patroon was required to purchase the land from the local Indians, and inhabit the land with 50 adults within four years, with at least one quarter arriving within one year. In return, the patroons were able to own the land and pass it to succeeding generations as a perpetual fiefdom, as well as receive protection and free African slaves from the Company.

It is believed that the system of patroonships was originally suggested by Van Rensselaer himself. He was reportedly one of the first of the Company to perceive that the building up of New Netherland could not be carried on without labor, and that labor could not be procured without permanent settlers. "Open up the country with agriculture: that must be our first step," was his urgent advice. The Company was not inclined to involve itself in further expense for colonization, and matters threatened to come to a halt, when someone — very likely Van Rensselaer himself — evolved the plan of granting large estates to men willing to pay the cost of settling and operating them.

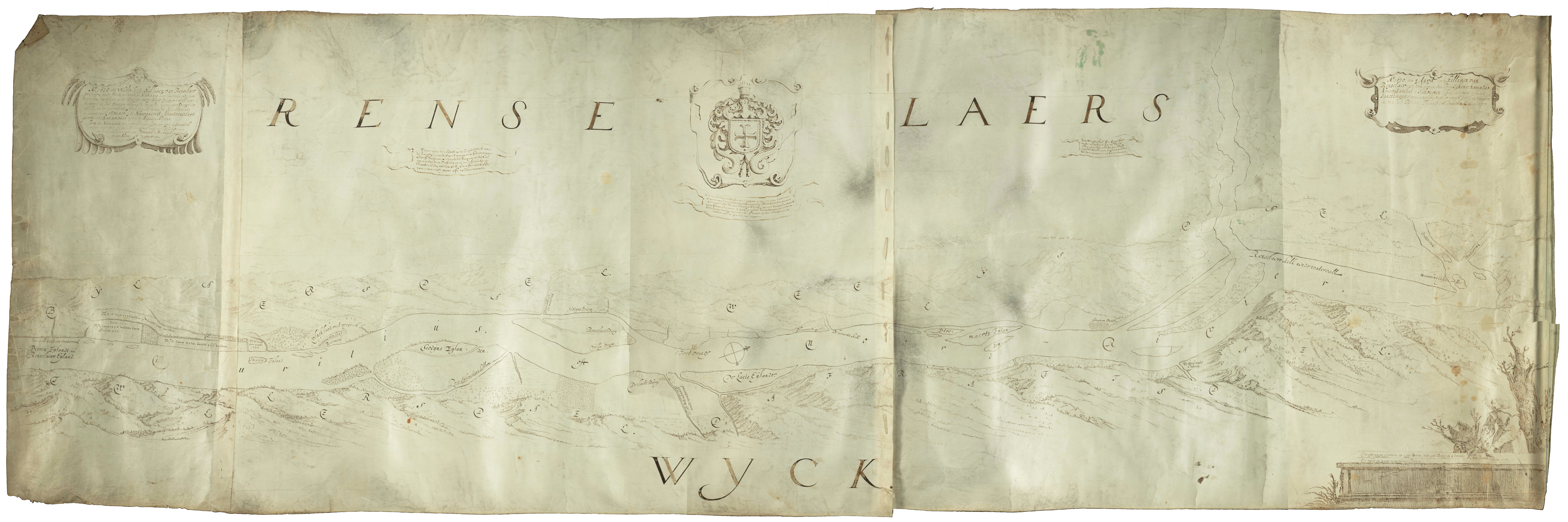
Original Map of Rensselaerswyck, c. 1632

Van Rensselaer was quick to take part in the new endeavor: on 13 January 1629, he sent notification to the Directors of the Company that he, in conjunction with fellow Company members Samuel Godin and Samuel Blommaert, had sent Gillis Houset and Jacob Jansz Cuyper to determine satisfactory locations for settlement. This took place even before the Charter was ratified, but was done in accordance with a draft of the Charter from 28 March 1628.

The agents had sent out a favorable report. They had selected an extensive domain on both sides of the North River (Note: The original Dutch name for the Hudson River.) in the vicinity of Fort Orange for Van Rensselaer, which extended 24 miles (39 km) in length, 40 miles (64 km) in breadth and covered an area of almost 1,000 square miles (2,600 km^{2}). The location relative to the fort was chosen with care — in case of danger, it would be a sure point of defense or retreat, and its garrison would be very likely to intimidate the natives. In this manner Van Rensselaer employed the troops of the Company more or less as coadjutors to his colonizing plans. Furthermore, the fort would become an easily reached marketplace for the colonists, where they could maintain communication with the outside world. For that reason, Van Rensselaer diligently maintained friendly relations with the commander of the garrison and the authorities within the walls.

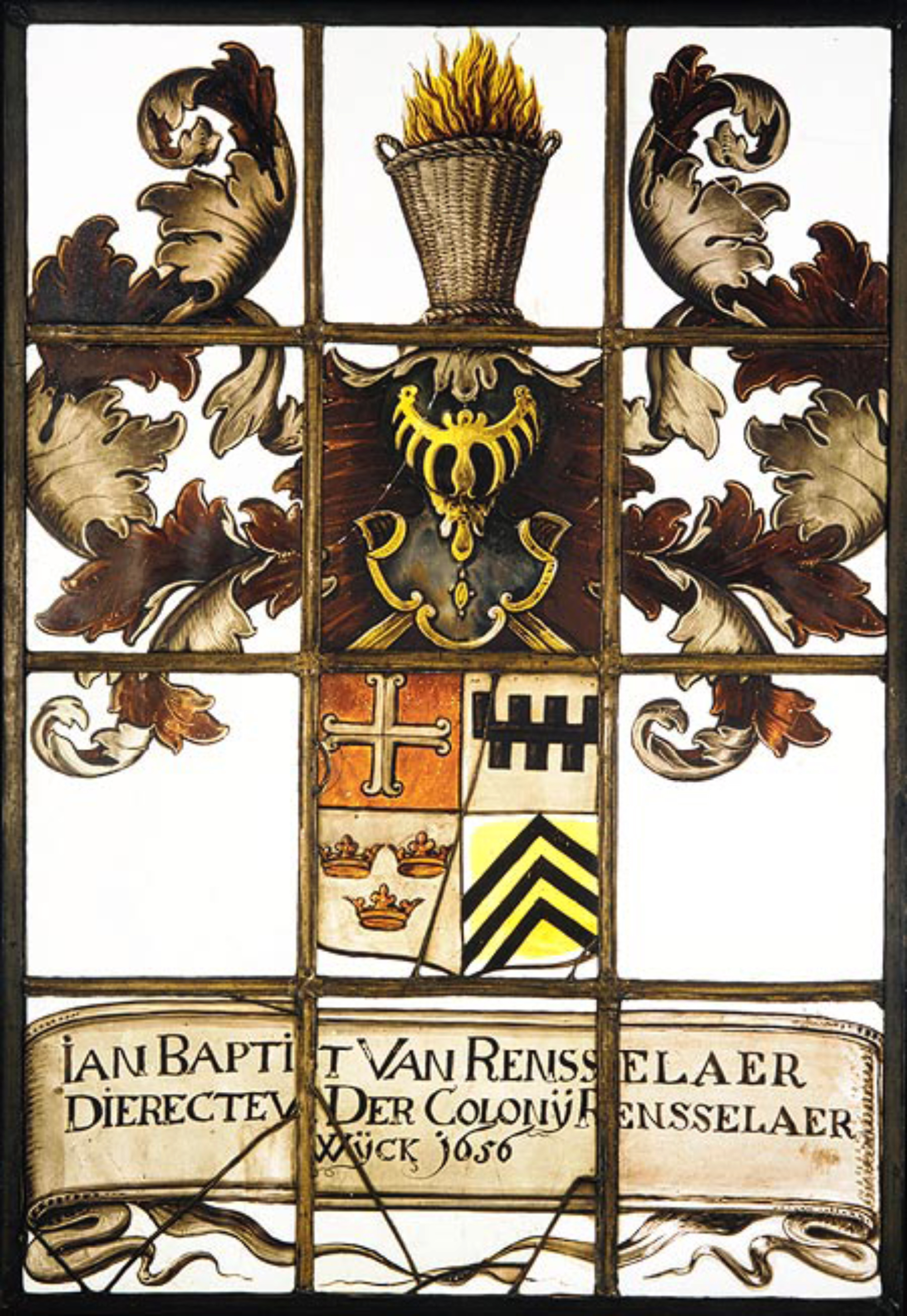
Van Rensselaer Stained Glass

His first act was to obtain possession of the land for his colony from the Mohican, the original owners, who had never been willing to sell their territory — not even the ground of Fort Orange. However, after they had been involved in a bloody war with their neighbors, the Mohawks, and were defeated in 1629, they were found ready to dispose of their possessions. In April, two officers of the West India Company in Fort Orange, Sebastiaen Jansen Krol and Dirk Cornelisz Duyster, specially empowered by writing of 12 January 1630, purchased a large tract of land on the west side of the North River (today's Hudson). Gillis Houset, one of the men initially sent to determine a settlement location, increased this territory in August by adding tracts of land on the east bank, located above and below Fort Orange. After the initial expansion, the territory was later further extended by deeds of purchase in May 1631 and April 1637.

The most troublesome aspect of settling the patroonships was enlisting the required number of colonists, resulting in the failure of many that were proposed. The patroons still dealt with the issues of a cautious people not caring to venture to an undeveloped world. As an owner of extensive lands in the sandy Gooi (Note: Whether Van Rensselaer also came under the influence of the spirit of the age, it is certain that in 1620 he began the cultivation of some heath lands in the Gooi, which he continued after he had become the owner, 16 June 1628, of the estate Crailo, near Huizen, to which he added a large stretch of mostly unreclaimed land.) and of family estates in the not much more fruitful Veluwe, where several relatives were landowners and struggled to subsist on meager means, Van Rensselaer had an advantage — his agents needed to employ little persuasion to induce some Gooiers and Veluwers to migrate to more fruitful regions where the farming would be less difficult. In addition, he could depend on the indirect support of his nephew Wouter van Twiller, who had been appointed Director of New Netherland in 1632, and with whom he engaged in friendly correspondence at a time when Dutch directors opposed the patroons in every way. In 1634 he collaborated with Michael Reyniersz Pauw, the patroon of Pavonia on shipping cattle.

With that, Van Rensselaer shipped out 37 immigrants on his ship Rensselaerswijck from Amsterdam on 26 September 1636. The vessel arrived on 7 April 1637. The population rose to more than 100 by 1642 and doubled that in the next ten years. The village of Beverwyck alone had more than 1000 inhabitants by 1660 and is said to have become urban by this point.

The good understanding between the patroons of the Amsterdam Chamber left nothing to be desired; Burgh, Godyn, Blommaert, and Van Rensselaer, before signifying to the directors their willingness to start colonies, made an agreement to work the projected colonies on joint account, each under the direction of one of them. Three of them would have a one-fifth share in each colony, while the fourth would receive the remaining two fifths, taking the responsibility for its management and exercising patroon rights.

Only Rensselaerswyck was a successful patroonship. Van Rensselaer successively purchased Godyn's share in the patroonship from his heirs, so that van Rensselaer soon became the owner of three-fifths. The two other shares remained partly in the hands of Blommaert and partly in the hands of others: Adam Bessels owning Blommaert's fifth, while Johannes de Laet and Toussaint Muyssaert split Burgh's fifth between them.

Letters saved by the Van Rensselaer family show that Kiliaen van Rensselaer never visited his colony in person.

== Personal life ==
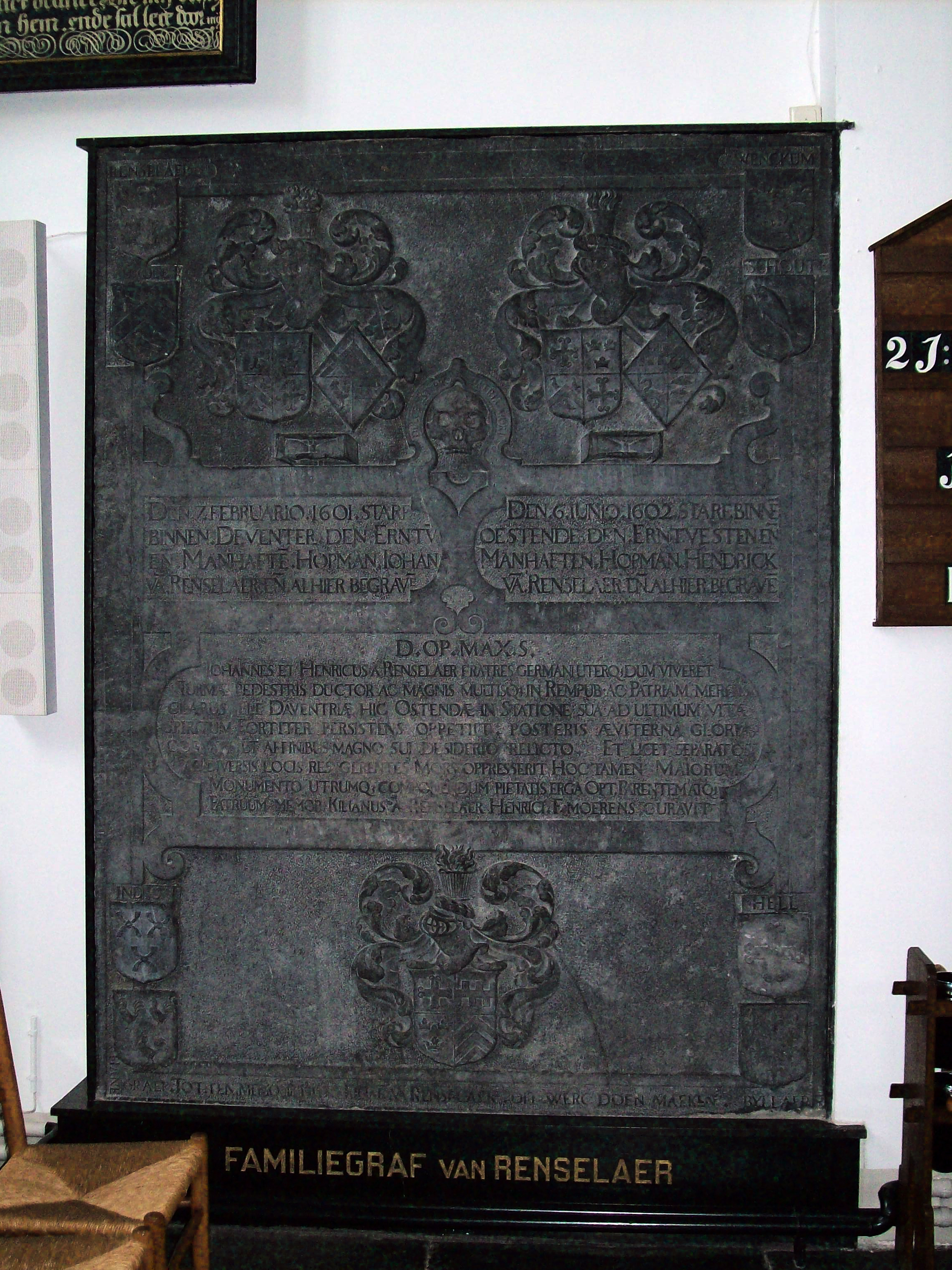
Rensselaer family gravestone in the church of Nijkerk, that Kiliaen bought commemorating his father Hendrick and uncle Johan. He probably purchased this when his first wife died, as her family name, Byllaer, is on the stone in the lower right. Kiliaen named his sons Hendrick and Johan after these men.

Van Rensselaer was married twice, first to his cousin Hillegonda van Bijler, on 23 July 1616. As the sole heir of her father Wolfert van Bijler (or Byllaer), she inherited 12,000 guilders. Hillegonda van Bijler was born around 1598, making her near the age of 18 at the time of her marriage to Van Rensselaer. The same year, the young husband purchased a couple of lots on the east side of the recently dug Keizersgracht in Amsterdam, between Marten and Wolven streets, where he built a house.

Van Rensselaer and Van Bijler had three children. The first was Hendrick, Kiliaen's first son, believed to have died in childhood. Johan, (Note: Sometimes spelled Jehan or Johannes.) their second son, was baptized on 4 September 1625. Maria, their last child, was buried on 4 January 1627. She died as an infant.

Hillegonda van Bijler is presumed to have died in late December 1626, since she was buried on 1 January 1627, three days before her third child Maria. She was around the age of 28 and the couple had been married less than eleven years.

Van Rensselaer re-married on 14 December 1627, to Anna van Wely, daughter of Van Rensselaer's former business partner. Van Wely was born around 1601, making her about 26 at the time of the marriage. The couple had eight children (Note: One source also claims that the couple had two more children after Ryckert: Wolter and Elizabeth. There is no corroborating evidence of such in Van Laer (1908), or any other major source cited in this article, all of which confirm the other children. It would not have been unlikely that Kiliaen might name one of his sons Wolter, though, considering that was the name of the first male Van Rensselaer, Hendrick Wolter van Rensselaer.) between 1629 and 1639, four boys and four girls:

- Jan Baptist: baptized 18 March 1629;
- Maria: baptized 23 March 1631;
- Jeremias: baptized 18 May 1632;
- Hillegonda: (Note: Sometimes spelled Hilegonda or Hillegond) baptized 8 November 1633;
- Eleanor: baptized 18 February 1635;
- Nicholas: (Note: Sometimes spelled Nicolaes or Nicolaus.) baptized 14 September 1636;
- Susanna: baptized 9 February 1638; and
- Ryckert: baptized 28 June 1639.

Van Wely outlived her husband, having died in Amsterdam in 1670.

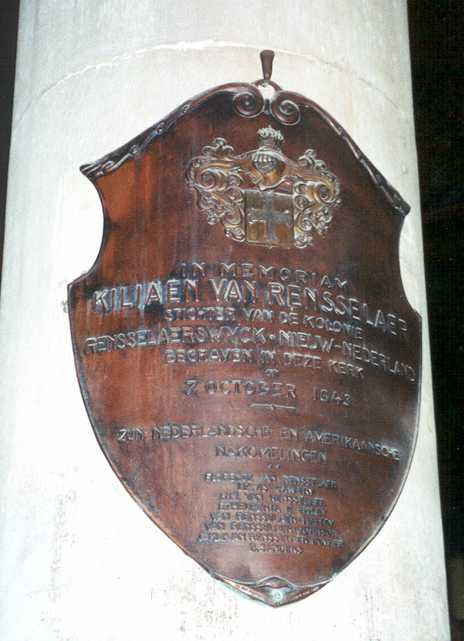
Memorial stone in Oude Kerk indicating a burial date

Little is known about Van Rensselaer's death, and sources even disagree on the year. Van Rensselaer was interred in the Oude Kerk in Amsterdam. His memorial stone states he was buried in the church on 7 October 1643.

== Legacy ==
Van Rensselaer's son Jeremias was the sole ancestor of the entire Van Rensselaer family in America, and only because of Kiliaen's purchase and development of the land in New Netherland. Included in the subsequent family tree is a very powerful and wealthy group of individuals over the course of American history. Within the paternal (Van Rensselaer) lineage, the family has produced numerous New York State Assemblymen and Senators, two Lieutenant Governors of New York, (Note: Stephen van Rensselaer III (1795–1801) and Jeremiah van Rensselaer (1801–1804).) and five Congressmen from New York between 1789 and 1842. (Note: Jeremiah van Rensselaer (1789–1790), Killian K. van Rensselaer (1801–1810), Solomon van Rensselaer (1819–1822), Stephen van Rensselaer III (1821–1828), and Henry Bell van Rensselaer (1841–1842))

Van Rensselaer is also the source of the names of the town of Rensselaerville, city of Rensselaer, and county of Rensselaer in upstate New York. Additionally, Rensselaer Polytechnic Institute in Troy was founded in 1824 by Stephen Van Rensselaer III as the Rensselaer School. It is now a world-renowned technical and engineering school. Notably, at the time of his death, Stephen III was worth about $10 million (about $88 billion in 2007 dollars) and is noted as being the tenth-richest American in history.

Rensselaerswyck continued as a legal entity until the mid-1840s, having survived Dutch and British colonial times, even being given a special patent by Queen Anne to confirm the patroon's fiefdom upon British takeover of the area. The end of the manor came with the Anti-Rent War, when many tenants rose against the successors of Stephen Van Rensselaer III (who had died in 1839), having much influence on the Legislature elections of the time, and eventually intimidating the Van Rensselaer family enough to sell off most of its holdings.

The family records, many of which were translated and published in the Van Rensselaer Bowier Manuscripts, reveal the personality of the man who figures prominently in the history of colonization as the founder of the only successful patroonship that ever existed in New Netherland. But beyond the fact that he managed this patroonship and that he was a merchant and director of the West India Company, practically nothing was known until the organization and translation of the family records in the early 1900s (decade). Current (circa 1990 plus) family members have the surname of Begley.

== Bibliography ==
- Ellis, David M.; James A. Frost; Harold C. Syrett; Harry J. Carman (1967) [1957]. A History of New York State. Ithaca, New York: Cornell University Press. ISBN 9780801401183. LCCN 67-20587.(Full text via Google Books.)
- French, John Homer (1860). Historical and statistical gazetteer of New York State. Syracuse, New York: R. Pearsall Smith. OCLC 224691273.(Full text via Google Books.)
- Goodwin, Maud Wilder (1919). Allen Johnson (ed.). The Chronicles of America Series: Dutch and English on the Hudson. Yale University Press. OCLC 2829262.(Full text via Google Books.)
- Netherland Chamber of Commerce in America (1909). The Dutch in New Netherland and the United States: 1609–1909. Netherland Chamber of Commerce in America. OCLC 1829161. "privileges and exemptions dutch charter 1629."(Full text via Google Books.)
- Spooner, W. W. (January 1907). "The Van Rensselaer Family". American Historical Magazine. 2 (1): 1–23.
- Van Laer, A. J. F. (translator and editor) (1908). Van Rensselaer Bowier Manuscripts. Albany: University of the State of New York. OCLC 9261526. "The Van Rensselaers in Holland and in America." (Full text via Google Books.)
- Van Rensselaer, Rev. Maunsell (1888). Annals of the Van Rensselaers in the United States Especially as they Relate to the Family of Killian K. van Rensselaer, Representative from Albany in the Seventh, Eighth, Ninth, and Tenth Congresses. Albany: Charles van Benthuysen & Sons. OCLC 1625467.(Full text via Google Books.)
- Venema, Janny (2003). Beverwijck: A Dutch Village on the American Frontier, 1652–1664. Albany, New York: State University of New York Press. ISBN 0-7914-6080-0. OCLC 52478515.(Full text via Google Books.)
- Venema, Janny (2010). Kiliaen van Rensselaer (1586-1643): Designing a New World. Hilversum: Uitgeverij Verloren. ISBN 978-90-8704-196-0. OCLC 673625096.(Full text via Google Books.)

This article incorporates text from the Van Rensselaer Bowier Manuscripts published by the New York State Library (1908), Annals of the Van Rensselaers in the United States by Rev. Maunsell van Rensselaer (1888), The Dutch in New Netherland and the United States: 1609–1909 published by The Netherland Chamber of Commerce in America (1909), and The Van Rensselaer Family by W. W. Spooner (1907), publications now in the public domain.
