= Map of Rensselaerswyck =

Circa 1632 map of Rensselaerswyck, Netherlands

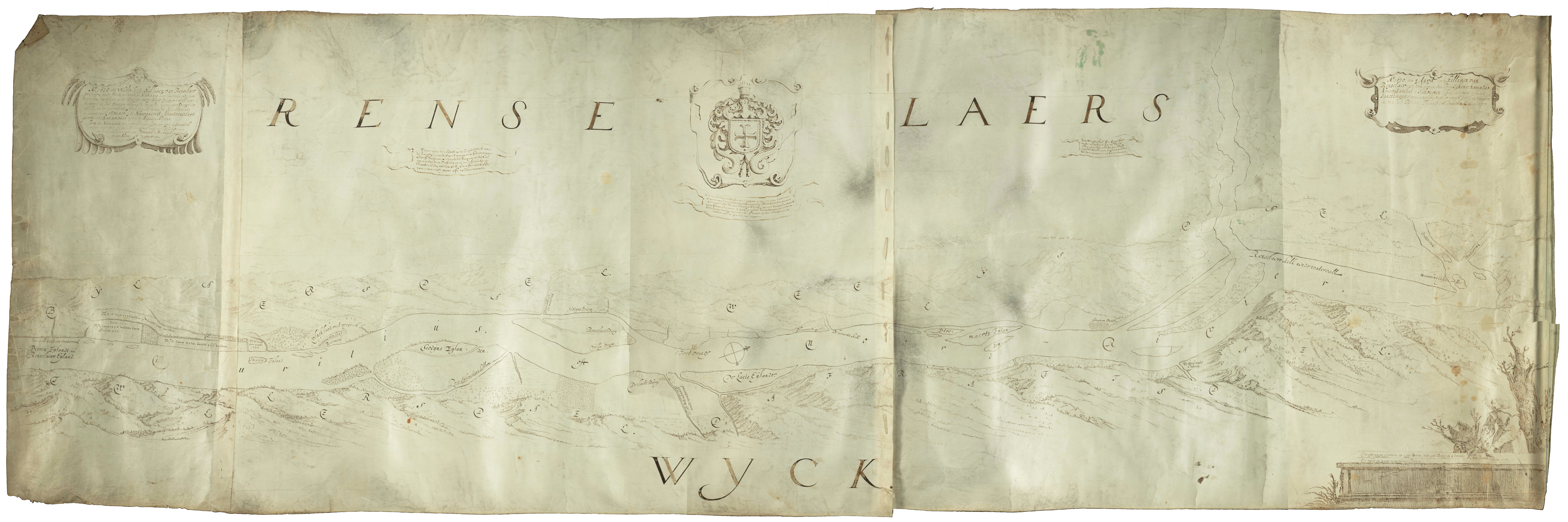
- Created: c. 1632
- Author: Unknown
- Purpose: To document the borders, topography, and locations within Rensselaerswyck

The Map of Rensselaerswyck^{[a]} is a map created during the 1630s, probably 1632, at the request of the owner of the Manor of Rensselaerswyck, Kiliaen van Rensselaer, Dutch jeweler and patroon. Rensselaerswyck was the only successful patroonship within the colony of New Netherland, settled by the Dutch West India Company at the behest of the States-General of the Netherlands. The map is believed to be the first ever commissioned or created of Rensselaerswyck.

== Background and description ==
The map is a manuscript map on parchment, 22 1/2 by 70 inches in size, and represents the land along the Hudson River from Barren Island, just south of Coeymans, to the mouth of the Mohawk River. Lithographic copies of the map have been published in Moulton's History of New York, O'Callaghan's History of New Netherland and in Munsell's Annals of Albany. The map is without date or maker's name. On the strength of an entry of the payment by Kiliaen van Rensselaer of six rixdollars to "Gillis van Schendel, for one map on parchment and four ditto on paper, of the islands and other tillable lands situated in my colony," occurring under date of February 8, 1630, in a copy of an account among the Rensselaerswyck manuscripts, the map is commonly ascribed to Gillis van Schendel and to the year 1630, but as an inscription on the map refers to the purchase of land from Beeren Island to Smacks Island, which took place in 1631, it is evident that the entry of the payment must either have been placed under the wrong date or else refer to another map. Statements by Kiliaen van Rensselaer in a letter to Johannes de Laet, June 27, 1632, in a memorandum to Wouter van Twiller, July 20, 1632, and in a letter of same date to Dirck Cornelisz Duyster indicate that the map was probably executed in Holland, shortly after July 20, 1632, from rough drafts and surveys of different parts of the colony furnished at various times by Philips Jansz van Haerlem, Crijn Fredericksz and Albert Dieterinck. Of these men very little is known. Philips Jansz van Haerlem is mentioned by David Pietersz de Vries, in his Korte Historiael, as a young man whom he engaged in June 1635 to pilot his vessel from Sandy Hook to New Amsterdam and who formerly had been in his service in the East Indies. Crijn Fredericksz is mentioned in Nicolaes van Wassenaer, Historisch Verhael, under date of November 1626, as an engineer who staked out the fort at New Amsterdam. Albert Dieterinck appears to have been commissary at Fort Orange.

A few features of the map call for special mention. The scale to which the map purports to be drawn is 16 7/8 inches to the Dutch mile, or 3 5/8 inches to the English mile. This makes the distance from Beeren Island to Moenemin's Castle, which on the original map is equal to 67 1/2 inches, exactly 4 Dutch miles, or the extent of territory allowed on one side of a navigable river by the fifth article of the Charter of Freedoms and Exemptions. As a matter of fact, however, the distance between these two points is not 4 Dutch miles, or 18.44 English miles, but about 22 1/2 miles, so that the actual scale of the map is only 3 inches to the mile. The central and lower portions of the river are fairly accurately drawn, but the upper part is wrong. Especially puzzling is the wide creek designated as Renselaers Kill, which would seem to represent the Mohawk River but does not occupy the right position. Perhaps the most plausible explanation of this error is that the compiler, at about that point, joined two separate maps and, from his unfamiliarity with the topography of the locality, failed to connect the south branch of the Mohawk, indicated on the one map at the falls, with the outlet marked on the other map, and then, from some statement regarding the direction of the river, continued this outlet straight into the country. It will be noticed that of most creeks only the mouths are indicated and that of others, which are traced for some distance into the country, the direction bears as a rule no relation to the configuration of the ground, which was probably sketched in from some high point after the survey of the shore line and the islands had been completed. Up to 1636, but three farms existed in the colony. The castles faintly shown near the names of Godijns Burg, Renselaers Burg, De Laets Burg, etc. represent therefore no actual settlements, but merely indicate the places where the patroon intended that farms should be established. At the time the map was drawn, the land bought for the colony of Rensselaerswyck was almost entirely limited to that on the west side of the river; all that was owned on the east side was a small tract opposite Fort Orange. The name Rensselaerswyck has been so placed as to cover exactly this territory belonging to the colony.

== Inscriptions ==
The inscriptions at the top of the map are as follows:

=== Left shield ===
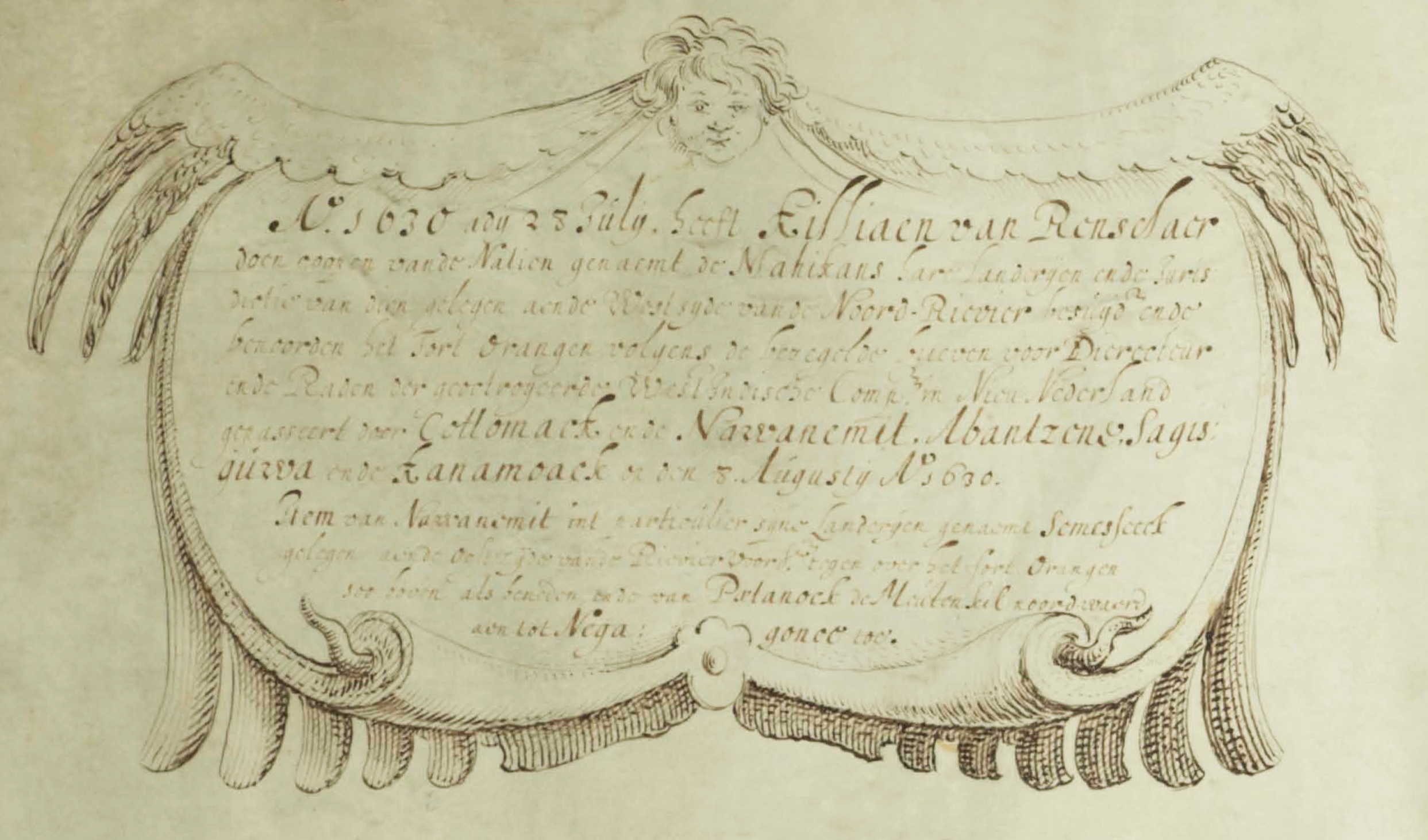
Left shield

Dutch: A.° 1630 adij 28 lulij, heeft Killiaen van Renselaer doen coopen vande Natien genaemt de Mahikans hare Landerijen ende Iurisdictie van dien gelegen aende Westsijde vande Noord-Rievier besuijd ende benoorden het Fort Orangen, volgens de bezegelde brieven voor Dierecteur ende Raden der geoctroijeerde West Indischie Comp. in Nieu Nederland gepasseert door Cottomaek ende Nawanemit, Abantzene, Sagisquwa ende Kanamoaek op den 8 Augustij A° 1630. Item van Nawanemit int particulier sijne Landerijen genaemt Semesseeck gelegen aende Oost zijde vande Rievier voorsz. tegen over het fort Orangen soo boven als beneden ende van Paetanock de Meulenkil noord-waerd aen tot Negagonce toe.
English: Anno 1630, on the 28th day of July, Killiaen van Rensselaer caused to be purchased from the nations called the Mahikans their lands and the jurisdiction thereof, situated on the west side of the North River,^{[b]} south and north of Fort Orange, according to the sealed conveyance executed before the director and council of the Chartered West India Company by Cottomack and Nawanemit, Abantzene, Sagisquwa and Kanamoack, on the 8th of August, Anno 1630. Also from Nawanemit individually his lands called Semesseeck, situated on the east side of the river aforesaid, opposite Fort Orange, above as well as below, and from Paetanock, the mill creek, northward to Negagonce.^{[c]}

=== Left scroll ===
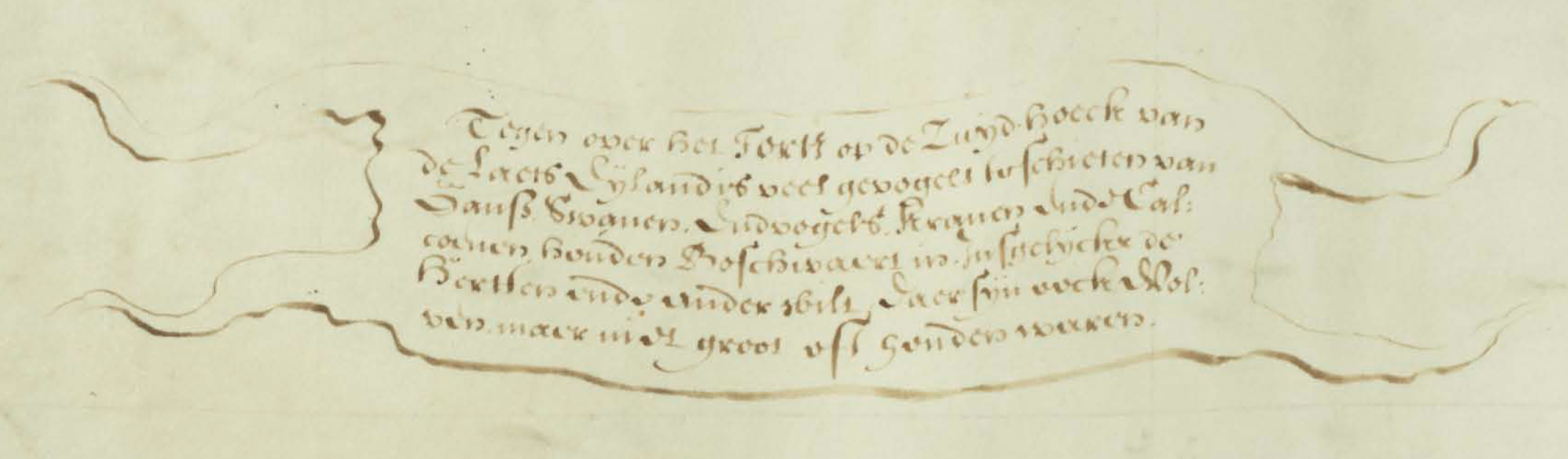
Left scroll

Dutch: Tegen over het Fortt op de Zuijd-Hoeck van de Laets Eijland is veel gevogelt te schieten van Gansz, Swanen, Endvogels, Kranen ende Calcoenen, houden Boschwaert in. Insgelijckx de Hertten ende ander wilt. Daer sijn oock Wolven, maer niet groot oft honden waren.
English: Opposite the Fort, on the south corner of de Laet's Island,^{[d]} many birds are to be shot, such as geese, swans, wild ducks and cranes, and turkeys are found in the woods. Also deer and other game. Wolves are found there also, but not large, like dogs.

=== Central scroll, under the van Rensselaer arms ===
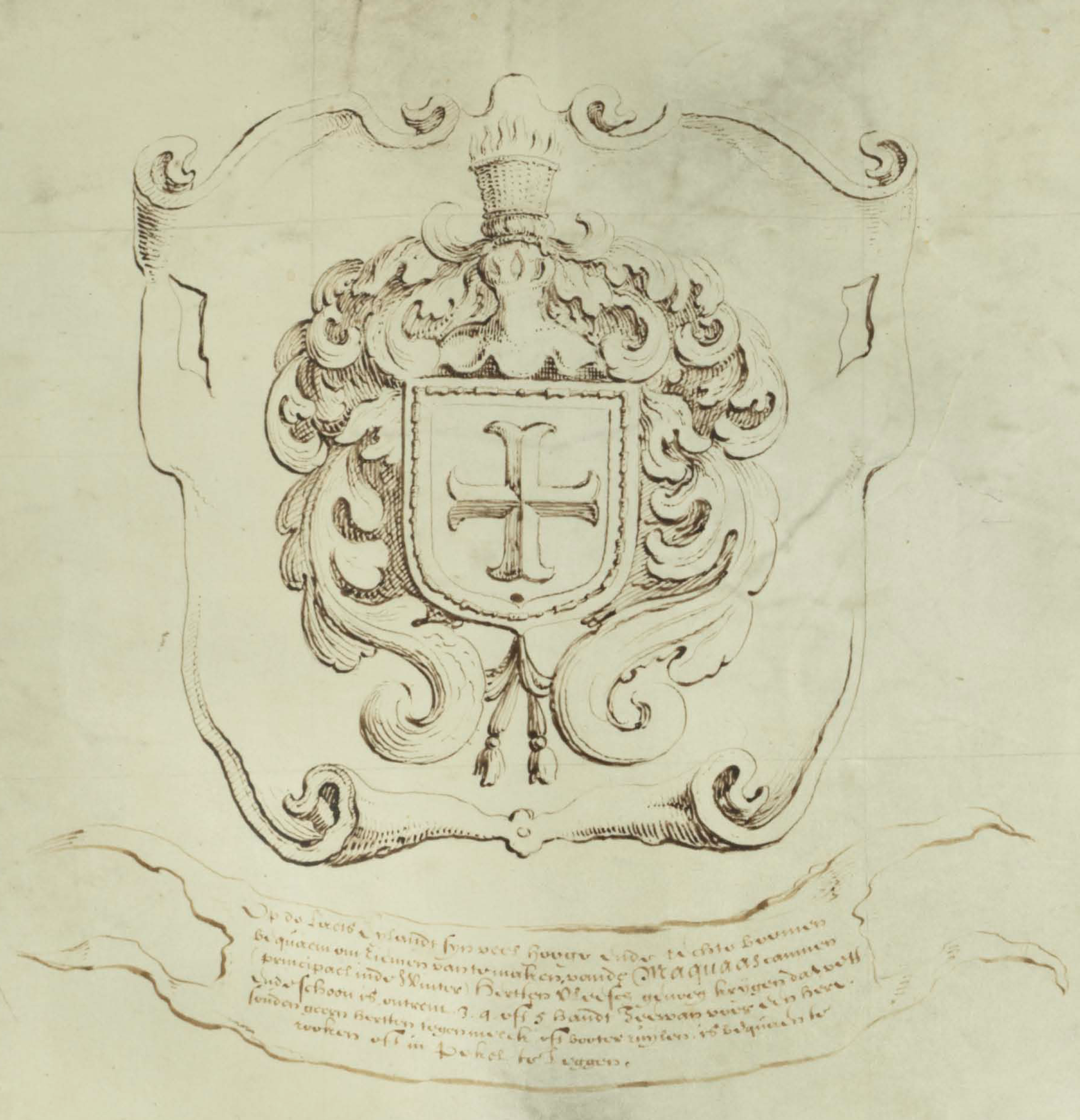
Center shield and scroll

Dutch: Op de Laets Eijlandt sijn veel hooge ende rechte boomen bequaem om riemen van te maken, vande Maquaas canmen (principael inde Winter) Hertten Vleesch genoeg krijgen dot vett ende schoon is, ontrent 3, 4, oft 5 handt Zeewan voor een hert. souden geern hertten tegen melck oft booter ruijlen, is bequaem te roocken oft in Pekel te Leggen.
English: On de Laets Island are many tall and straight trees suitable to make oars from. From the Maquaas (especially in the winter) plenty of venison can be obtained that is fat and fine; about 3, 4, or 5 hands of seawan for a deer. They would be glad to exchange deer for milk or butter. The meat is fit for smoking or pickling.

=== Right scroll ===
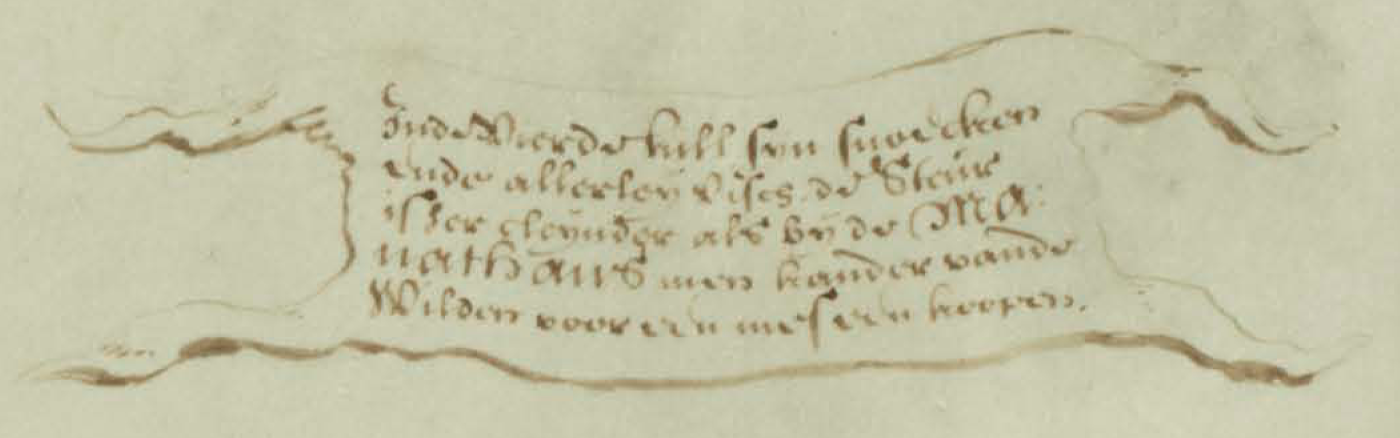
Right scroll

Dutch: Inde Vierde kill sijn snoecken ende allerleij Visch. de Steur isser cleijnder als bij de Manathans men kander vande Wilden voor een mes een koopen.
English: In the fourth kill [designated on the map as Bloemaerts Kill and apparently corresponding to the present Patroon Creek] are pike and all sorts of fish. The sturgeon there is smaller than at the Manathans. One can be bought from the savages for a knife.

=== Right shield ===
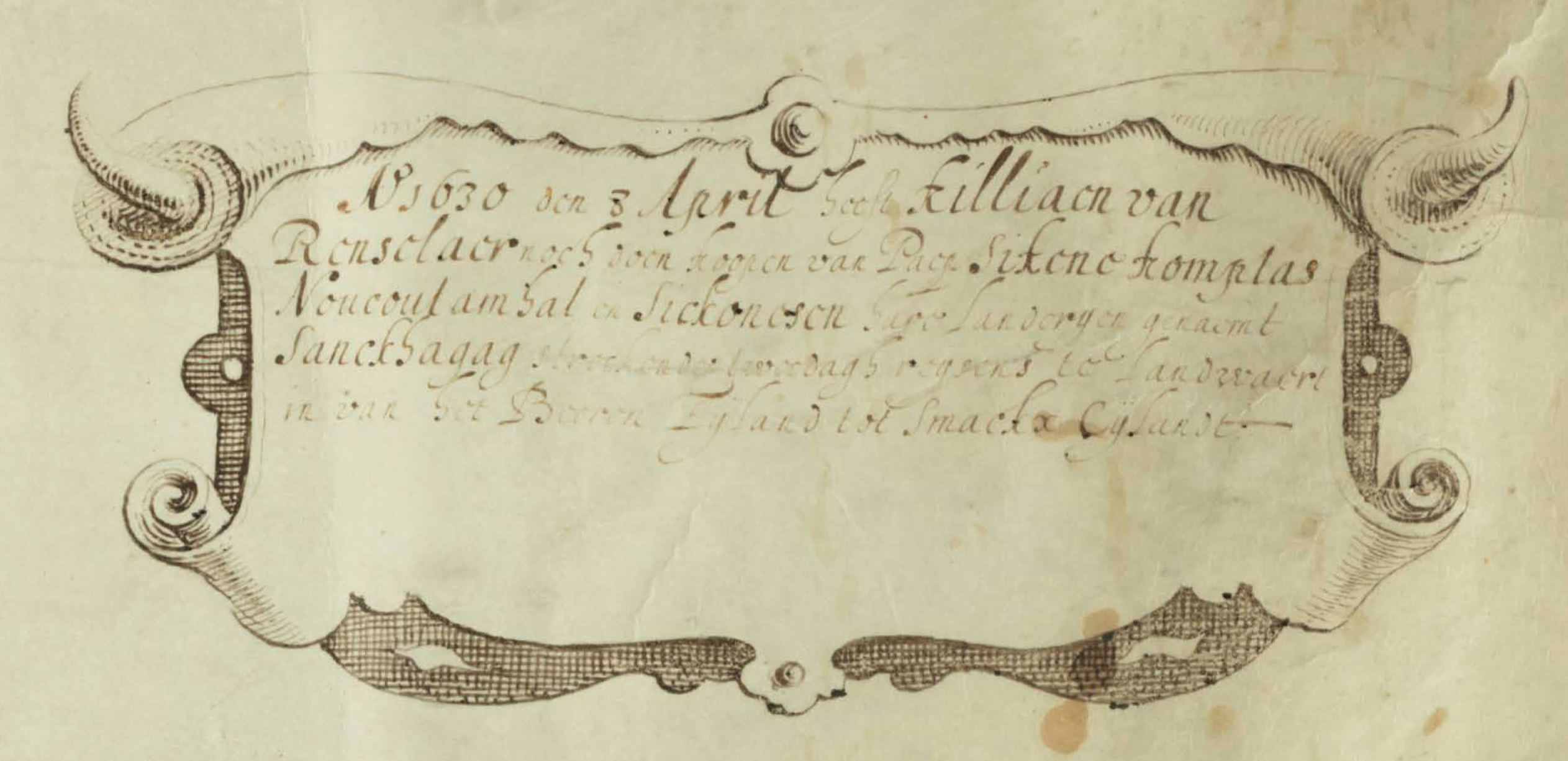
Right shield

Dutch: A° 1630 den 8 April heeft Killiaen van Renselaer noch doen koopen van Paep Sickene Komptas Noucoutamhat en Sickonosen hare landerijen genaemt Sanckhagag streckende twee dagh reijsens te landwaert in van het Beeren Eijland tot Smaeks Eijlandt.
Anno 1630, the 8th of April, Killiaen van Renselaer [sic] caused further to be bought from Paep Sickene, Komptas, Noucoutamhat and Sickonosen their lands called Sanckhagag, stretching two days' journey inland, from Beeren Island to Smackx Island.

== Naming conventions ==
The names Bijlaers Dael, Weelijs Dael, Twillers Dael and Pafraets Dael, given to the respective districts on both sides of the river, above and below Fort Orange, commemorate the names of Kiliaen van Rensselaer's first wife, Hillegonda van Bijlaer; of his second wife, Anna van Wely; of his only sister Maria, wife of Rijckaert van Twiller and mother of Wouter van Twiller; and of his mother, Maria Pafraet.

== The map today ==
The original copy, or possibly one of the dittos, is currently owned by and on display at the New York State Museum in Albany, New York. It was shown as part of the exhibit 1609, which commemorated the quadricentennial of the arrival of Henry Hudson in New York.

== Notes ==
- a. The document is actually titled Renselaerswyck [sic], which is a misspelling of Kiliaen van Rensselaer's name.
- b. The original Dutch name for the Hudson River.
- c. This description differs from that in the patent certificate of August 13, 1630.
- d. De Laet's Island was later renamed Van Rensselaer Island.

== Bibliography ==
- Van Laer, A. J. F. (translator and editor) (1908). Van Rensselaer Bowier Manuscripts. Albany: University of the State of New York. "The Van Rensselaers in Holland and in America." (Full text via Google Books.)
