= William W. Van Ness =

American politician (1776–1823)

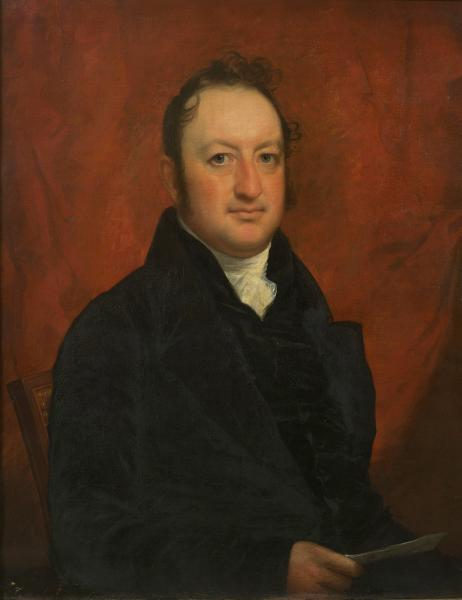
Image of William W. Van Ness

William W. Van Ness (1776–1823) was a New York lawyer, state judge, and legislator. From Claverack, New York, he studied law with John Bay of that same town and was admitted to the bar in 1792. He served in the state assembly from 1804 to 1806 and on the Supreme Court bench of the state from 1807 to 1822. Van Ness was also a delegate to the State Constitutional Convention in 1821 but was part of the minority that did not approve of the final draft. In 1820, Van Ness stood trial for impeachment on claims that he had used his position to obtain a bank charter. He was acquitted, but his health suffered after the experience. He died in Charleston, South Carolina, on February 27, 1823. His body is interred at Reformed Dutch Church of Claverack.

Van Ness married his wife Jane in 1796, and had five children. His house in Claverack, the William W. Van Ness House and also known as "Talavera", was added to the National Register of Historic Places in 1997.

== See also ==
- William W. Van Ness House
