= Lewis Rendt =

German soldier (1769–1849)

Captain Lewis Rendt (1769 in the Holy Roman Empire – 1849 in Canada) was an early 19th-century Hessian soldier of the Swiss regiment, who later fought with the British in the Mediterranean (during the Invasion of Sicily), Spain, Egypt, and North America (during the British-American 1812 War). His regiment fought under the Duke of Wellington in Spain from 1811 to 1813. He was stationed variously at Cádiz, Malta, and Montreal.

While stationed in Cádiz in 1811 he married Juaquina (Josephine, Sophia) Ramirez de Arrellano. They had seven children, including Rachel, who married Francis Ramacciotti, and Frances, who married Captain L.R.Boynton and was the mother of Major Nathan Boynton, who founded Boynton Beach, Florida.

In the 1812 War he was an officer in the British-controlled Swiss Regiment De Wattville. Upon his retirement, he took to farming on the Canadian side of the St. Clair River near Port Huron with the aid of a Canadian land grant. He received 900 acres for his military service. He sold 100 acres back to the Crown, for the benefit of the Chippewa Indians. Later when oil was discovered on it the Crown reneged on the promise to the Indians and sold it to an oil company instead as written in Canada's Victorian Oil Town. He was also active as an agent of the state of Michigan in promoting Europeans to settle there.

== Bibliography ==
- Société Vaudoise d'Histoire et d'Archéologie: Revue Historique Vaudoise 1894; p. 369. List of officers of the De Watteville Regiment – Louis Rendt, de Hesse-Dannstadt.
- Elliot, Ernest: British Numismatic Journal and Proceedings of the British Numismatic Society – 1949; p 223. Lieutenant Louis Rendt.
- Western Historical Co (1888). History of St. Clair County, Michigan. A.T. Andreas & Company. p. 560. "Lewis Rendt, early pioneer... promoted from First Lieutenant of Company L to Captain of the De Watteville Regiment"
- Sawyer, Alvah L. (1911). A history of the northern peninsula of michigan and its people. Chicago, Lewis Pub. Co.
- Canada (2015). Indian Treaties and Surrenders, from 1680 to [1903], Volumes 1-2 – Scholar's Choice Edition. Creative Media Partners, LLC. ISBN 978-1-295-97900-4.
- "Canada's Victorian Oil Town: The Transformation of Petrolia from a ... - Page 5 by Christina Ann Burr On 13 March 1841 Lewis Rendt sold the east half of lot nine"
- "Journal – Page 739 Michigan. Legislature. House of Representatives – 1841- ... part three of the revised statutes — Mr. Humphrey, 286 Referring the communication of Louis Rendt to the committee on ... the county of Chippewa"
- "A List of the Officers of the Army and of the Corps of Royal Marines- Great Britain. War Office – 1818 – Nov. 1805 promoted lieutenant -Louis Rendt"
- Dix, Les (1937). Les cahiers des Dix. Vol. 2. Canada.
