= Jacob R. Van Rensselaer =

American politician

Jacob Rutsen Van Rensselaer

Secretary of State of New York
- In office 1813–1815
- Governor: Daniel D. Tompkins
- Preceded by: Elisha Jenkins
- Succeeded by: Peter Buell Porter

Speaker of the New York State Assembly
- In office 1812–1813
- Preceded by: Alexander Sheldon
- Succeeded by: James Emott

Member of the New York State Assembly
- In office 1800, 1808, 1808–09, 1811, 1812, 1812–13, 1814, 1814–15 and 1819

Personal details
- Born: September 27, 1767 Claverack, Province of New York, British America
- Died: September 22, 1835 (aged 67) New York City, New York, U.S.
- Spouse: Cornelia De Peyster
- Relations: See Van Rensselaer family
- Parent(s): Robert Van Rensselaer; Cornelia Rutsen
- Education: Washington Seminary
- Alma mater: Yale University

Jacob Rutsen Van Rensselaer (September 27, 1767 – September 22, 1835) was an American lawyer and Federalist politician who served as Speaker of the New York State Assembly from 1812 to 1813, and Secretary of State of New York, from 1813 to 1815.

== Early life ==
Jacob Rutsen Van Rensselaer was born on September 27, 1767, in Claverack, Columbia County in what was then the Province of New York, a part of British America. He was the second son of Gen. Robert Van Rensselaer (1740–1802) and Cornelia (née Rutsen) Van Rensselaer (1746–1790), who had married in April 1765.

His maternal grandparents were Jacob Rutsen (1716–1753) and Alida (née Livingston) Rutsen (1716–1798). After his grandfather died, his grandmother remarried to Hendrick Van Rensselaer (1712–1793). His paternal grandparents were Johannes Van Rensselaer (1708–1793), a Brigadier General during the American Revolutionary War, a member of the New York Provincial Congress and the 1st New York State Assembly, and Engeltie "Angelica" (née Livingston) Van Rensselaer (1698–1746/47).

He attended Washington Seminary, graduated from Yale University in 1787, studied law and attained admission to the bar.

== Career ==
During the War of 1812, he commanded troops which were drafted in Columbia County, and were ordered to the defense of the city of New York.

Van Rensselaer was a member of the New York State Assembly in 1800, 1808, 1808–09, 1811, 1812, 1812–13, 1814, 1814–15 and 1819; and was Speaker in 1812–13. He was Secretary of State of New York from 1813 to 1815 and was a delegate to the New York State Constitutional Convention of 1821. He was associated with Gov. DeWitt Clinton in building the Erie Canal.

== Personal life ==
He married Cornelia De Peyster (1774–1849), the daughter of Pierre Guillaume De Peyster (1745–1807). Her paternal uncle was Arent DePeyster (1736–1822), the British military officer, and her brother, William de Peyster, was married to Mary Roosevelt, niece of Nicholas Roosevelt. Their home, the Jacob Rutsen Van Rensselaer House and Mill Complex, built circa 1805 is today listed on the National Register of Historic Places. Together, they were the parents of:

- Cornelia Van Rensselaer, who died young.
- Pierre De Peyster Van Rensselaer (1797–1802), who died young.
- Cornelia Rensselaer, who died at the age of nineteen.
- Eliza Bayard Van Rensselaer (1801–1835)
- Pierre Van Rensselaer, who died at the age of twenty-five.
- Jacob Rutsen Van Rensselaer, who married Emily Denning, granddaughter of William Denning, in 1848.
- Robert Schuyler Van Rensselaer (c. 1810–1874), who married Virginia Kidd.
- Jeremiah Van Rensselaer (1812–1874), who married Mary Fleming (1810–1881), daughter of Gilbert Fleming.
- Catharine Schuyler Van Rensselaer (1813–1838), who died from grief shortly after the death of her father.

After his death in New York City on September 22, 1835, he was buried in the cemetery at the Reformed Dutch Church of Claverack.

Political offices
Preceded by Alexander Sheldon	Speaker of the New York State Assembly; 1812–1813	Succeeded by James Emott
Preceded by Elisha Jenkins	Secretary of State of New York; 1813–1815	Succeeded by Peter B. Porter
