= Claverack, New York =

- Town
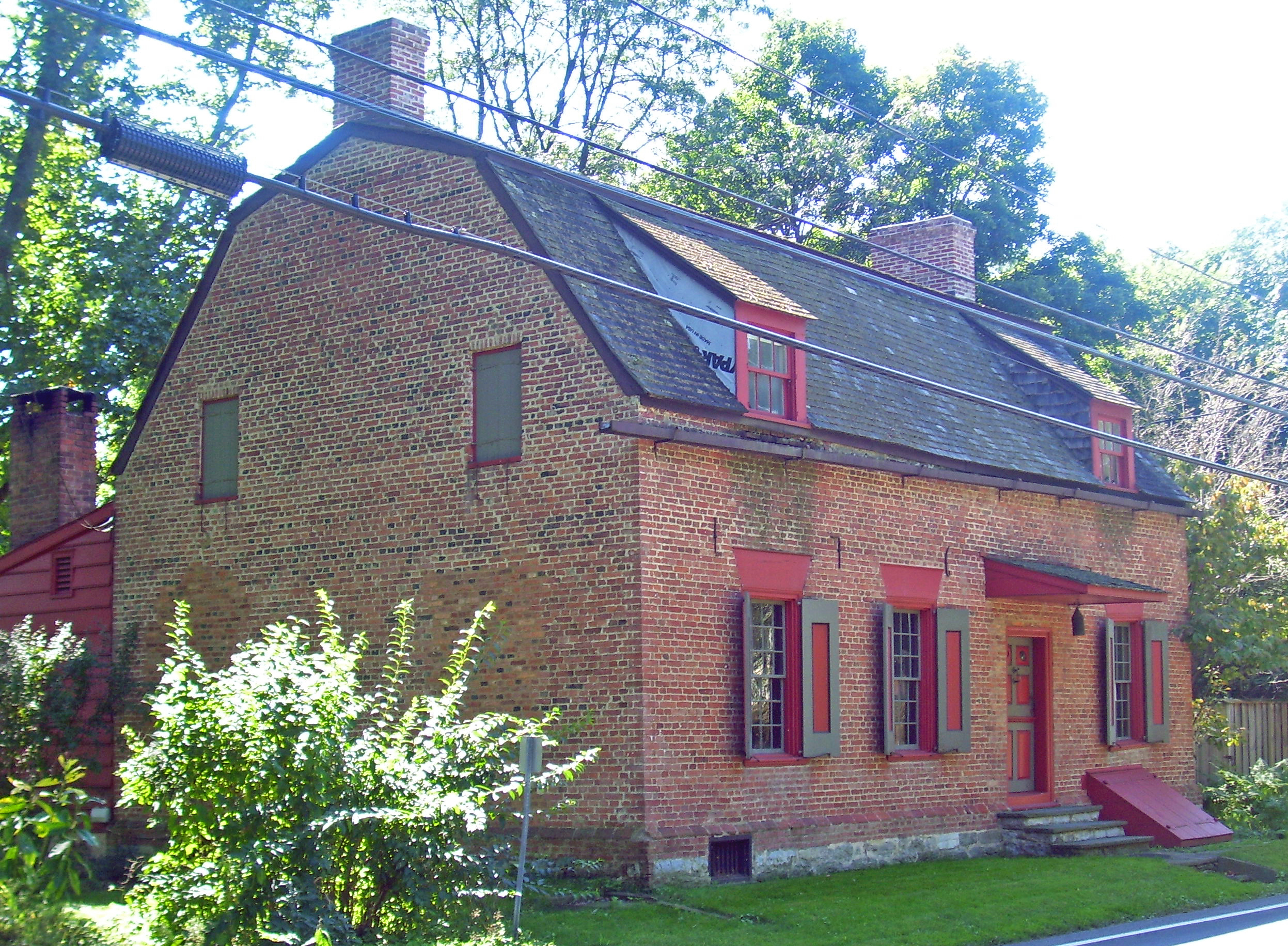
- Cornelius Muller House in Claverack

- Location of Claverack, New York
- Coordinates: 42°13′54″N 73°41′42″W
- Country: United States
- State: New York
- County: Columbia

Government
  - Type: Town Council
  - Town Supervisor: Clifford Weigelt (R)
  - Town Council: Members' List: • Stephen Hook (R); • Katy Cashen (D); • Bill Gerlach (R); • Brian Keeler (R)

Area
  - Total: 47.95 sq mi (124.19 km^{2})
  - Land: 47.56 sq mi (123.18 km^{2})
  - Water: 0.39 sq mi (1.01 km^{2})
- Elevation: 522 ft (159 m)

Population (2020)
  - Total: 6,058
  - Density: 127.4/sq mi (49.18/km^{2})
- Time zone: UTC-5 (Eastern (EST))
  - Summer (DST): UTC-4 (EDT)
- ZIP Codes: 12513 (Claverack); 12530 (Hollowville); 12544 (Mellenville); 12565 (Philmont); 12521 (Craryville); 12529 (Hillsdale); 12534 (Hudson); 12075 (Ghent)
- Area code: 518
- FIPS code: 36-021-16045
- GNIS feature ID: 0978834
- Website: townofclaverack.com

Claverack is a town in Columbia County, New York, United States. The population was 6,058 at the 2020 census. The town name in English was derived from the Dutch word Klaverakker, meaning "Clover Fields" or "Clover Reach". In 1705, a Dutch tenant farmer made the first discovery of a mastodon tooth here.

The town is centrally located in Columbia County, east of the city of Hudson.

== History ==
Claverack was originally approximately 60,000 acres (24,000 ha) in area and was known as the Lower Manor of Rensselaer, part of a vast estate on both sides of the Hudson River granted in the 17th century to an early prominent Dutch family.

During the American Revolution, the Town was formed in 1778 from the older District of Claverack. In 1782, some of the land was reassigned to the newly organized town of Hillsdale. Claverack was reduced again in 1785 to form the city of Hudson.

In 1779 Washington Seminary was founded in the town by the local Dutch Reformed pastor. Prominent former students at the school include U.S. President Martin Van Buren. In the nineteenth century the school was renamed Claverack College; it closed in 1902. The many 18th-century homes in the area include the 1786 William Henry Ludlow House.

In addition to the William Henry Ludlow House, other properties and structures on the National Register of Historic Places include the Claverack Free Library, Double-Span Whipple Bowstring Truss Bridge, George Felpel House, First Columbia County Courthouse, Stephen Hogeboom House, Dr. Abram Jordan House, Ludlow-Van Rensselaer House, Jacob P. Mesick House, Harmon Miller House, Stephen Miller House, Cornelius S. Muller House, Harriet Phillips Bungalow, Rev. Dr. Elbert S. Porter House, Reformed Dutch Church of Claverack, Stephen Storm House, Trinity Episcopal Church, Jan Van Hoesen House, William W. Van Ness House, Van Rensselaer Lower Manor House, Conyn Van Rensselaer House, and Jacob Rutsen Van Rensselaer House and Mill Complex.

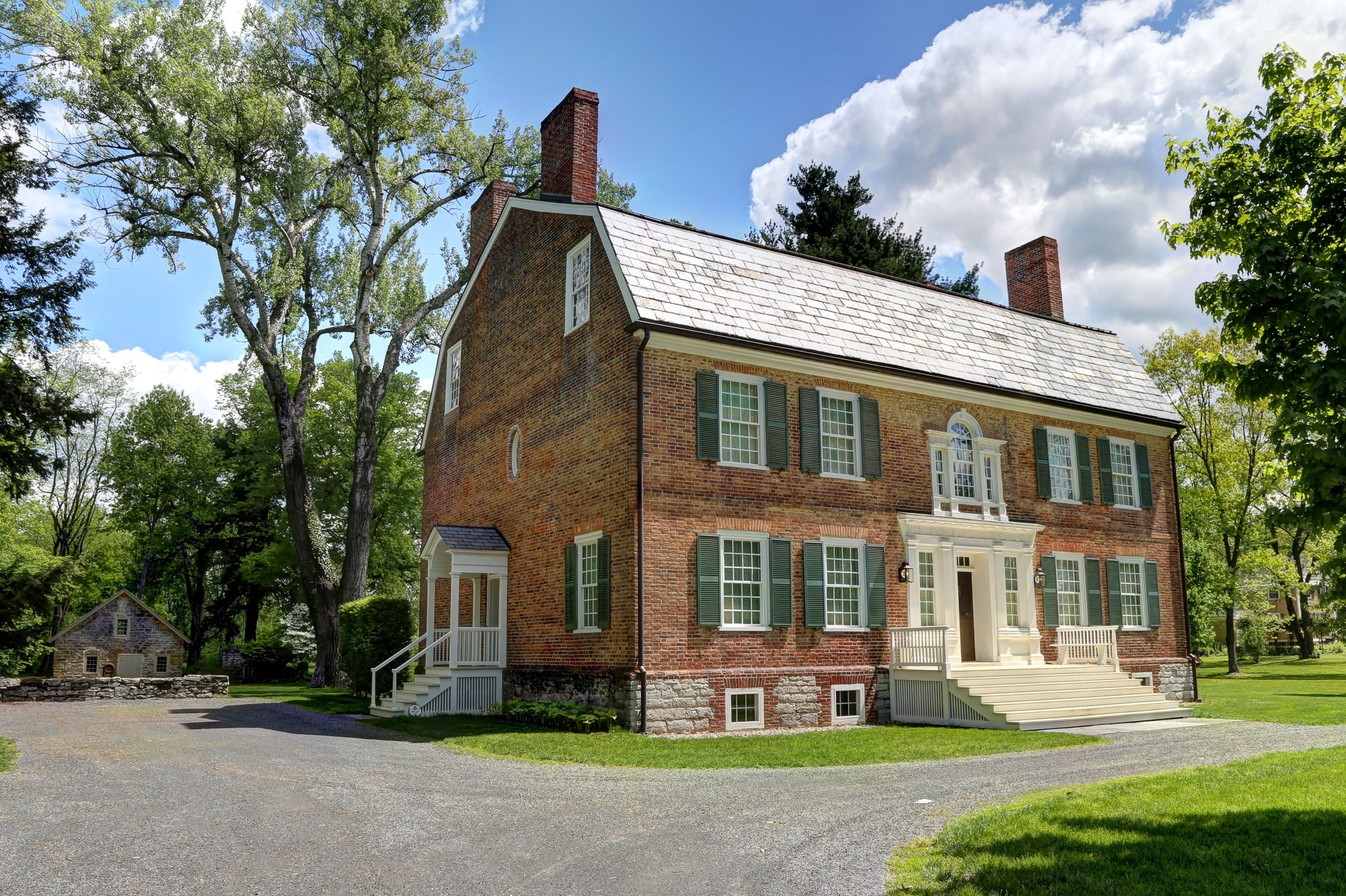
William Henry Ludlow House

== Notable people ==
- Stanley Bate, English composer and pianist.
- Daniela Bertol, Italian-born architect, designer and artist.
- Aaron Burr and Alexander Hamilton tried cases in the local courthouse.
- Mihail Chemiakin, a Russian artist.
- Nancy Fuller, chef and host of Farmhouse Rules on the Food Network, was born and raised here.
- Anne Grant, Scottish poet, writer.
- Thomas W. Lamont, banker, born here.
- Elizabeth Mumbet Freeman was born here.
- Ismail Merchant and James Ivory owned property in Claverack and were very supportive of local interests, especially Columbia Memorial Hospital in nearby Hudson. (James Ivory still visits this property in Claverack.)
- Margaret Sanger attended the former Claverack College (closed 1902) for two years.
- Joan Steiner, American illustrator and puzzle designer
- John J. Tallmadge was born here.
- Henry D. Todd Jr., U.S. Army major general, born in Claverack
- Martin Van Buren was admitted to the bar here.

== Geography ==
According to the United States Census Bureau, the town has a total area of 48.0 square miles (124.2 km^{2}), of which 47.6 square miles (123.2 km^{2}) is land and 0.39 square miles (1.0 km^{2}), or 0.81%, is water.

Claverack Creek enters the town at the hamlet of Mellenville and runs southwest before turning north and forming the western town boundary before entering Stockport. Taghkanic Creek is a major tributary from the south and forms the western boundary of the town before entering Claverack Creek.

The Taconic State Parkway passes north-south through the eastern side of the town.

== Demographics ==
Historical population
| Census | Pop. | Note | %± |
|---|---|---|---|
| 1790 | 3,262 | | — |
| 1820 | 2,813 | | — |
| 1830 | 3,038 | | 8.0% |
| 1840 | 3,056 | | 0.6% |
| 1850 | 3,208 | | 5.0% |
| 1860 | 3,477 | | 8.4% |
| 1870 | 3,671 | | 5.6% |
| 1880 | 4,347 | | 18.4% |
| 1890 | 4,518 | | 3.9% |
| 1900 | 4,416 | | −2.3% |
| 1910 | 4,114 | | −6.8% |
| 1920 | 3,747 | | −8.9% |
| 1930 | 4,168 | | 11.2% |
| 1940 | 4,071 | | −2.3% |
| 1950 | 4,406 | | 8.2% |
| 1960 | 4,989 | | 13.2% |
| 1970 | 5,711 | | 14.5% |
| 1980 | 6,061 | | 6.1% |
| 1990 | 6,414 | | 5.8% |
| 2000 | 6,395 | | −0.3% |
| 2010 | 6,021 | | −5.8% |
| 2020 | 6,058 | | 0.6% |
U.S. Decennial Census

As of the census of 2000, there were 6,401 people, 2,485 households, and 1,669 families residing in the town. The population density was 134.3 inhabitants per square mile (51.9/km^{2}). There were 2,839 housing units at an average density of 59.6 per square mile (23.0/km^{2}). The racial makeup of the town was 93.95% White, 3.31% African American, 0.20% Native American, 0.36% Asian, 0.06% Pacific Islander, 0.78% from other races, and 1.33% from two or more races. Hispanic or Latino of any race were 2.47% of the population.

There were 2,485 households, out of which 29.6% had children under the age of 18 living with them, 53.4% were married couples living together, 9.1% had a female householder with no husband present, and 32.8% were non-families. 26.4% of all households were made up of individuals, and 13.3% had someone living alone who was 65 years of age or older. The average household size was 2.44 and the average family size was 2.96.

In the town, the population was spread out, with 24.4% under the age of 18, 6.5% from 18 to 24, 25.3% from 25 to 44, 24.6% from 45 to 64, and 19.1% who were 65 years of age or older. The median age was 41 years. For every 100 females, there were 100.8 males. For every 100 females age 18 and over, there were 94.7 males.

The median income for a household in the town was $41,647, and the median income for a family was $50,175. Males had a median income of $32,896 versus $23,925 for females. The per capita income for the town was $19,848. About 3.8% of families and 6.7% of the population were below the poverty line, including 6.8% of those under age 18 and 7.1% of those age 65 or over.

== Communities and locations in Claverack ==
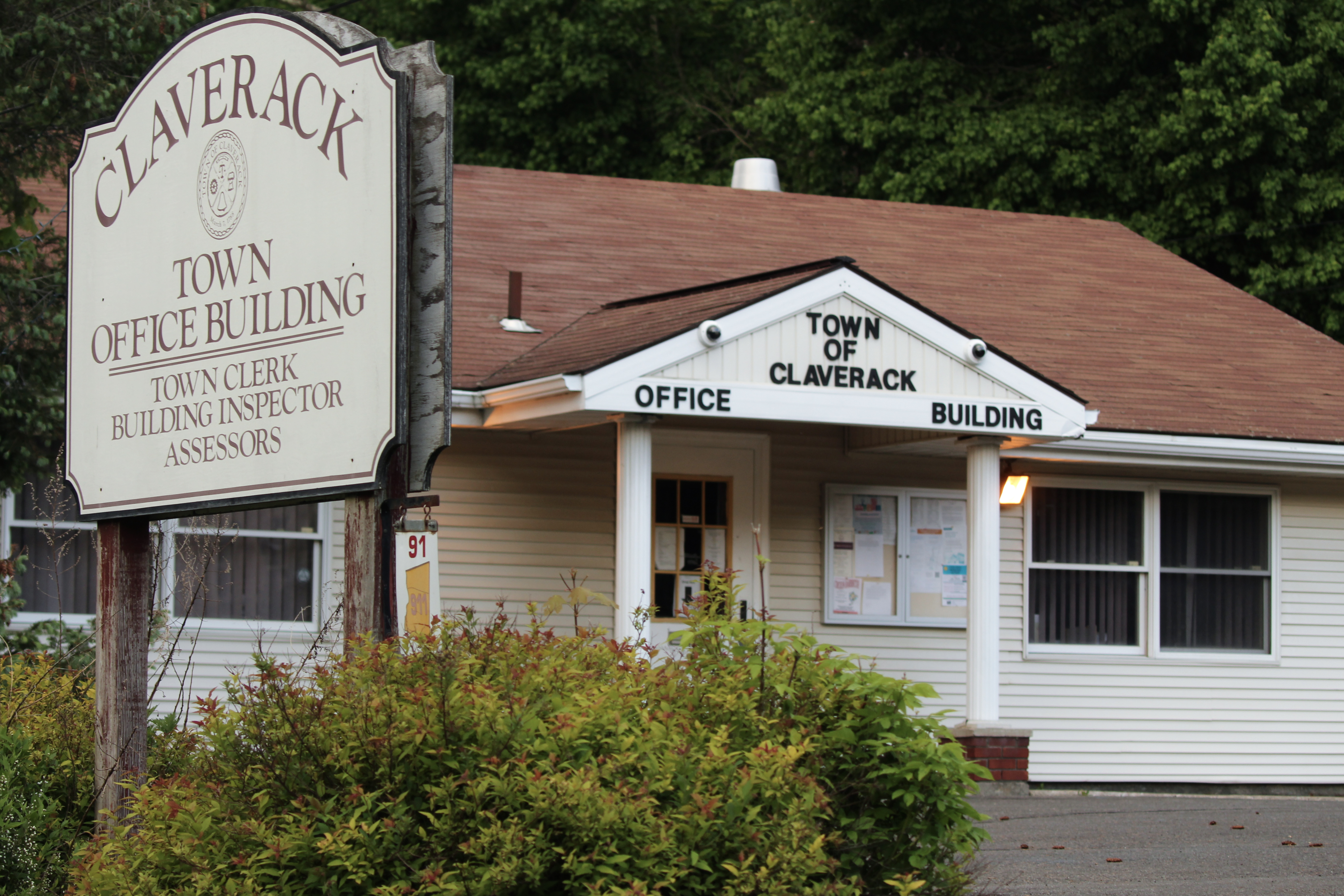
Claverack town offices

- Brick Tavern – A hamlet in the northwestern corner of the town.
- Churchtown – A hamlet on the southern town line.
- Claverack – The hamlet of Claverack is in the western part of the town.
- Hollowville – A hamlet southeast of Claverack village.
- Martindale – A hamlet by the eastern town boundary, by the Taconic State Parkway.
- Mellenville – A hamlet in the northeastern part of the town, west of Philmont. The Mellenville Railroad Station was listed on the National Register of Historic Places in 2000.
- Philmont – The village of Philmont in the northeastern section of the town.
- Red Mills – A location east of Claverack village.
- Upper Hollowville – A hamlet between Hollowville and Martindale.
