= William Knight (Wisconsin politician) =

American politician

William Knight (December 7, 1843 – January 13, 1941) was a businessman from Bayfield, Wisconsin, involved at one time or another as a merchant, in lumbering, banking, selling real estate, and orchardist, who served one term as a Republican member of the Wisconsin State Assembly.

== Background and early years ==
Knight was born December 7, 1843, on a farm in Kent County, Delaware, near Dover. Until the age of twelve, he attended his local public schools. At that time, he switched to academies in Camden and then Dover, followed by two years at the Hudson River Institute in Claverack, New York.

After leaving school, he moved to Detroit, where he worked as a clerk at a mustering and disbursement office of the United States government. He left Detroit in 1867, going first to St. Louis, then to Wyoming (where he operated as a merchant). He left there in 1869, coming to Bayfield, where he settled (except for a year in Ashland, spending most of the ensuing decades in the banking and lumbering trades. By 1910, he had shifted to selling real estate and developing fruit orchards.

== Public office ==
Knight had already served on his town board and his county board of supervisors, as well as county clerk and treasurer (appointed to fill a vacancy in 1896) of Bayfield County, Wisconsin when he was elected in 1910 to represent the Assembly seat for Bayfield, Sawyer and Washburn counties. A Republican, he received 2,558 votes to 355 for Social Democrat H. Johnson (Republican incumbent Frank Hammill was not a candidate). He was assigned to the standing committee on banks, and the joint committee on finance.

His Assembly district was divided up in the 1911 redistricting of the Assembly, and he was not a candidate for re-election. In his home county of Bayfield (now its own district), he was succeeded by Hubert Peavey, a self-described Progressive Republican.

== Orchardist ==
Knight was a member of the Bayfield Peninsula Horticultural Society and a life member of the Wisconsin State Horticultural Society, although as an orchardist he described himself as "a layman in this business." He was an avid advocate of orchard fruit growing in Bayfield County's "Fruit District." He was honored by the Wisconsin Horticultural Society for his achievements in 1930.

Knight died at Dousman, Wisconsin on January 13, 1941.
