= Joan Steiner =

American illustrator and puzzle designer

Joan C. Steiner
- Born: October 10, 1943; New Brunswick, New Jersey
- Died: September 8, 2010 (aged 66); Claverack, New York
- Known for: Illustration
- Notable work: "Look-Alikes" books
- Spouse: George Rodenhausen

Joan C. Steiner (October 10, 1943 – September 8, 2010) was an American illustrator and puzzle designer.

== Biography ==
Joan Steiner was born in New Brunswick New Jersey on October 10th 1943 to Emery and Klara Steiner who were both immigrants from the Kingdom of Hungary who immigrated to the United States at the start of World War II. She also had an older brother named Tom. She was a graduate of Barnard College, she was the recipient of numerous art and design awards, including a Society of Illustrators Award and a National Endowment for the Arts fellowship.

Her first book, Super Look-Alikes, received glowing reviews and was featured on national television in the USA. Her second book, Amazing Look-Alikes, published by Walker Books, features over 700 everyday objects in disguise, ranging from paper clips to refrigerator magnets.

Steiner died from cancer on September 8, 2010, at the age of 66 in her home in Claverack, New York.

== Publications ==
- Look-Alikes: The More You Look, the More You See! (1998)
- Look-Alikes Jr. (1999)
- Look-Alikes Christmas (2003)
- Look-Alikes Around the World (2007)
- Look-Alikes: Seek-and-Search Puzzles (2011)

== Awards and recognition ==
- 1998: Look-Alikes - The New York Times Book Review's Notable Children's Books of 1998

== Exhibitions ==
- 2007: Look-Alikes: The Amazing World of Joan Steiner - New York State Museum, Albany, New York
- 2016: I Spy with My Little Eye: Joan Steiner Look-Alikes - The Albany Institute of History & Art, Albany, New York
- 2017: Joan Steiner's Look-Alikes - The Albany Institute of History & Art, Albany, New York
- 2018: Joan Steiner's Look-Alikes - The Albany Institute of History & Art, Albany, New York
