= Ada Josephine Todd =

American author and educator

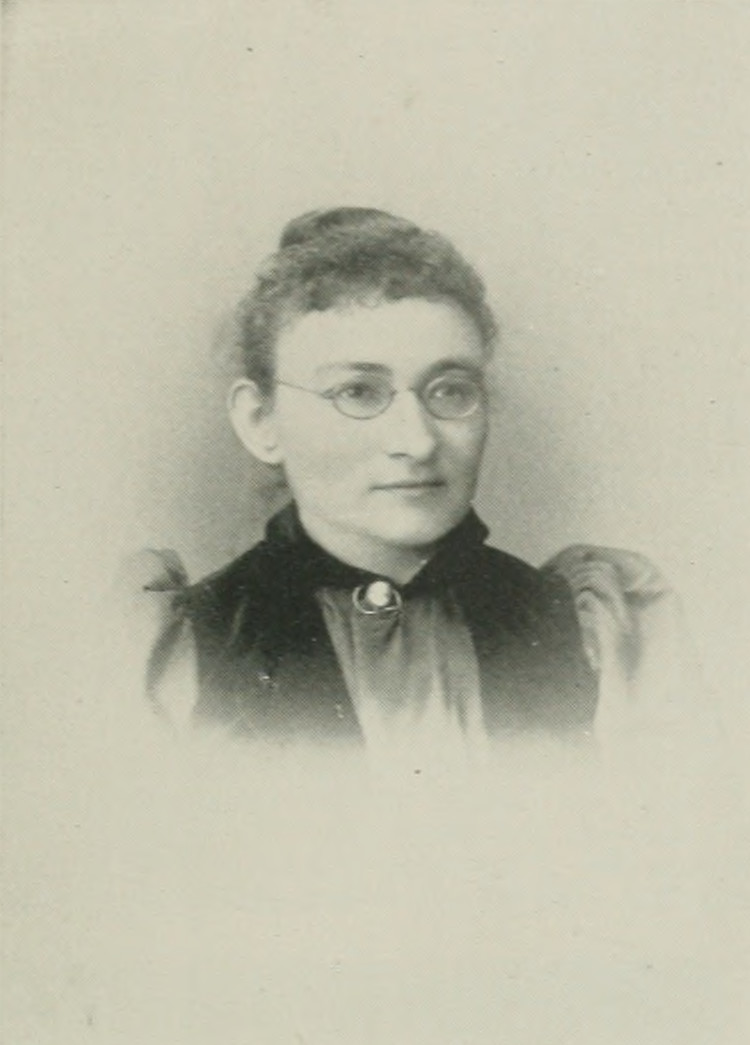
- Photo from A Woman of the Century
- Born: June 16, 1858; Redding, Connecticut
- Died: October 27, 1904 (aged 46); Puerto Rico
- Education: Ph.D. from Boston University
- Occupations: educator; author
- Writing career
- Notable work: The Vacation Club

Ada Josephine Todd (also known as Adah J. Todd; June 16, 1858 – October 27, 1904) was an American author and educator born in Connecticut. She pursued an extensive education despite limited financial means, graduating from Claverack College before earning degrees from Syracuse University and Boston University. She held teaching positions in classical languages and the sciences at institutions in Ohio and Connecticut, including Xenia Female College and Bridgeport High School, where she introduced the laboratory method into public school science instruction. Todd combined her academic career with a strong interest in literature, publishing articles, translations, and a book titled The Vacation Club (1892), which explored topics in natural history, geology, and astronomy. She was active in literary and educational organizations, including the Association of American Authors, the Browning Society of Philadelphia, and the Collegiate Alumnae Association, where she served in leadership roles.

== Early life and education ==
Ada (or, "Adah") Josephine Todd was born in Redding, Connecticut, June 16, 1858. Her parents were Seth Todd and Deborah (Burr) Todd. She descended on her father's side from Christopher Todd, one of the pioneer settlers of New Haven Colony. On her mother's side, from Jehue Burre of Fairfield, Connecticut she inherited character from a double line of Puritan ancestry. Ada's siblings were Henry Burton Todd (b. 1846); Charless Burr (b. 1849); Jennie S. Todd and Hattie E., twins (b. 1860).

As her father had a large family and little wealth, he could give his daughter only the advantages of the common schools and a preparatory school. In 1873, she graduated from the Fort Edward Collegiate Institute, New York, and in 1876, attended Claverack College. By teaching in summer and writing throughout the year, she succeeded in paying her expense in college and received from Syracuse University the degree of A.B., in 1880. By her efforts and in opposition to the wishes of her friends, she continued her studies in Greek and philosophy and won the degree of A.M., in Syracuse University, in 1883. In 1886, Boston University conferred upon her the degree of Ph.D. for work in languages and literature. She was valedictorian of one of her classes and salutatorian of another.

== Career ==
In 1880–81, she served as Lady Principal and professor of Greek and Latin in Xenia Female College, Ohio. She resigned to continue her studies, 1881–82. She was a teacher of Natural Science at Union School, Waterville, Connecticut, 1882–83. In 1883–93, she was a science teacher in the Bridgeport high school, and was the first to introduce the full laboratory method into the public schools of Connecticut. Her work in that department was very successful and she received for it about half the salary a man would have received. She was a Fellow in Philology at the University of Pennsylvania, 1893–96.

At a later period, she took charge of Greek in the same school at Bridgeport, fitting pupils for Yale College, Harvard College, and women's colleges, and having many private pupils in both Greek and Latin. In the summer of 1887, Todd took the place formerly occupied by Dr. Dio Lewis in the department of physiology and physical culture of the Martha's Vineyard Summer Institute.

She always had a strong inclination for literary work, and her first published articles appeared when she was sixteen. She wrote for various papers and magazines, made translations, assisted in the revision of James H. Shepard's Elements of Chemistry, and furnished weekly papers on natural history for The Living Church of Chicago, in 1891. In the summer of 1892, her first book was published under the title, The Vacation Club. It was published by Thomas Whittaker, New York, was a colloquial treatment of natural history, geology, and astronomy dedicated to the members of the Agassiz Association, and written in a spirit of reverence to the memory of Louis Agassiz as well as to the deity.

She was a member of several literary, philanthropic and social clubs, including the Association of American Authors and the Browning Society of Philadelphia. She served as vice-president of the Collegiate Alumnae Association, and was the Director of the Connecticut state branch.

== Personal life ==
Todd made home in Redding. She died at Puerto Rico, October 27, 1904.

== Selected works ==
- The Vacation Club, 1892
