= William W. Van Ness House =

Historic house in New York, United States

- U.S. National Register of Historic Places
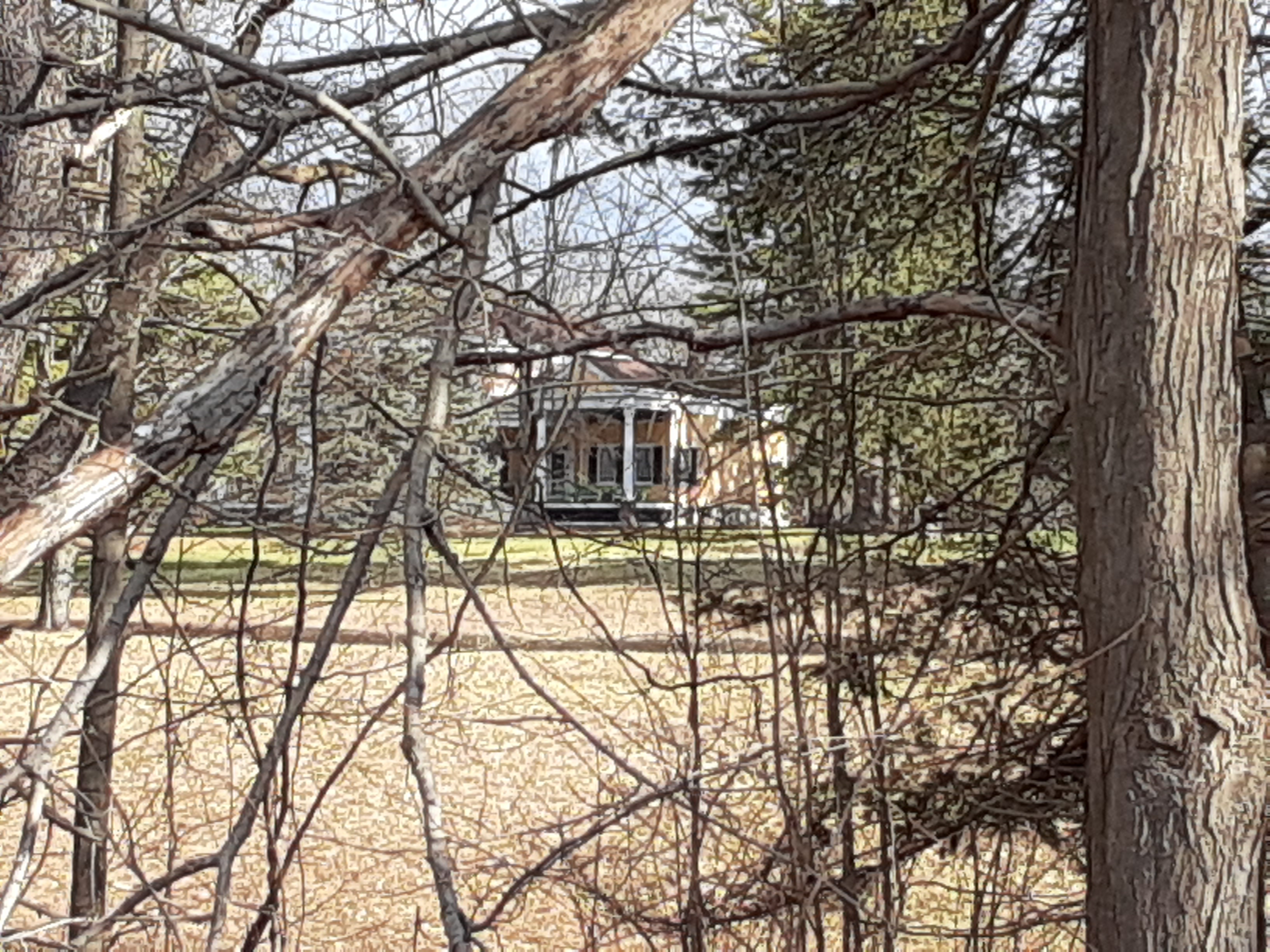

- Location within New York Location within the United States
- Location: 270 NY 9H, Claverak, New York
- Coordinates: 42°14′22″N 73°43′33″W
- Area: 103 acres (42 ha)
- Built: 1818
- Architectural style: Federal
- MPS: Claverack MPS
- NRHP reference No.: 97000824
- Added to NRHP: August 8, 1997

William W. Van Ness House, also known as "Talavera", is a historic home located at Claverack in Columbia County, New York. It was built in 1818 for New York State Judge William W. Van Ness and is a Federal-style residence. It is composed of a central 2-story, two-bay main block flanked by two 1 1/2-story wings. The wings are connected to the main house by single-story entrance hyphens. The entrance features a 2-story central portico. The property also includes three timber-frame barns and a wood-frame tool house.

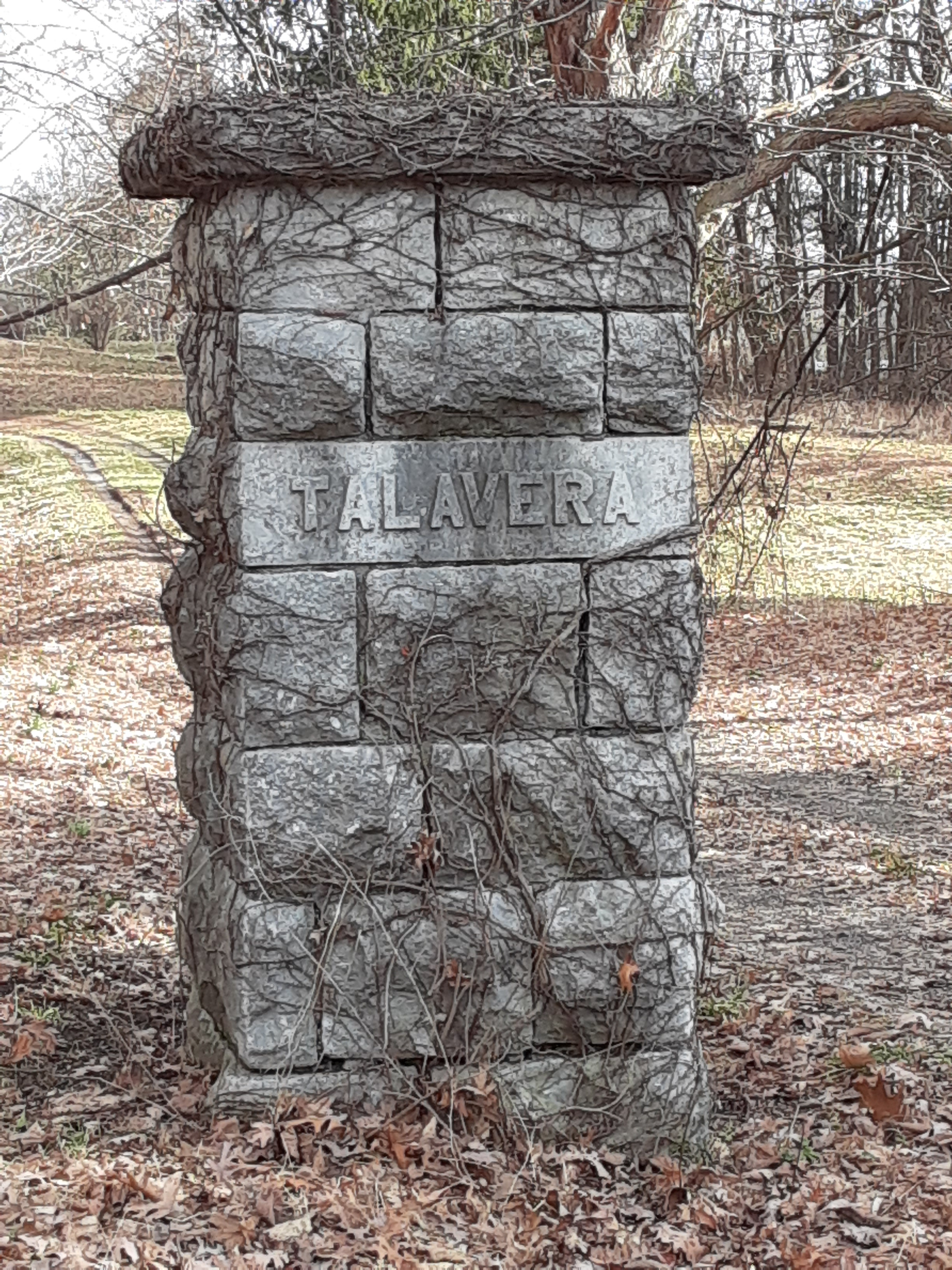
"Talavera"

It was added to the National Register of Historic Places in 1997.
