= Conyn Van Rensselaer House =

Historic house in New York, United States

- Konyn Van Rensselaer House
- U.S. National Register of Historic Places
- Location within New York Location within the United States
- Nearest city: Claverack, New York
- Coordinates: 42°12′01″N 73°45′15″W
- Area: 154 acres (62 ha)
- Built: 1766
- Architectural style: Georgian, Federal
- NRHP reference No.: 09000861
- Added to NRHP: October 20, 2009

Conyn-Van Rensselaer is a historic home located on Stone Mill Road in the town of Claverack, New York. It is a gambrel-roofed structure of brick, two and a half stories high, and was eventually owned by A. H. Van Rensselaer, a descendant of Hendrick Van Rensselaer. It has recently undergone extensive restoration. The property also contains barns and outbuildings.

Kasparus Konyn was a captain in a provincial regiment, and warmly espoused the American cause in the Revolution. In 1776 he erected this large house. The Conyns were among the Palatine Germans who immigrated to the Germantown area of Columbia County, New York in the 1700s seeking religious freedom. He married Mildred (Joan Gardner) Yates who was a member of another local family, for whom a nearby road is named.

The area was well settled by members of the Van Rennselaer family who eventually acquired the farm upon Conyn's demise and have held it since.

The historic home of Hendrick I. Van Rensselaer is nearby on Yates Road in the town of Greenport.
