= Rev. Dr. Elbert S. Porter House =

Historic house in New York, United States

- U.S. National Register of Historic Places
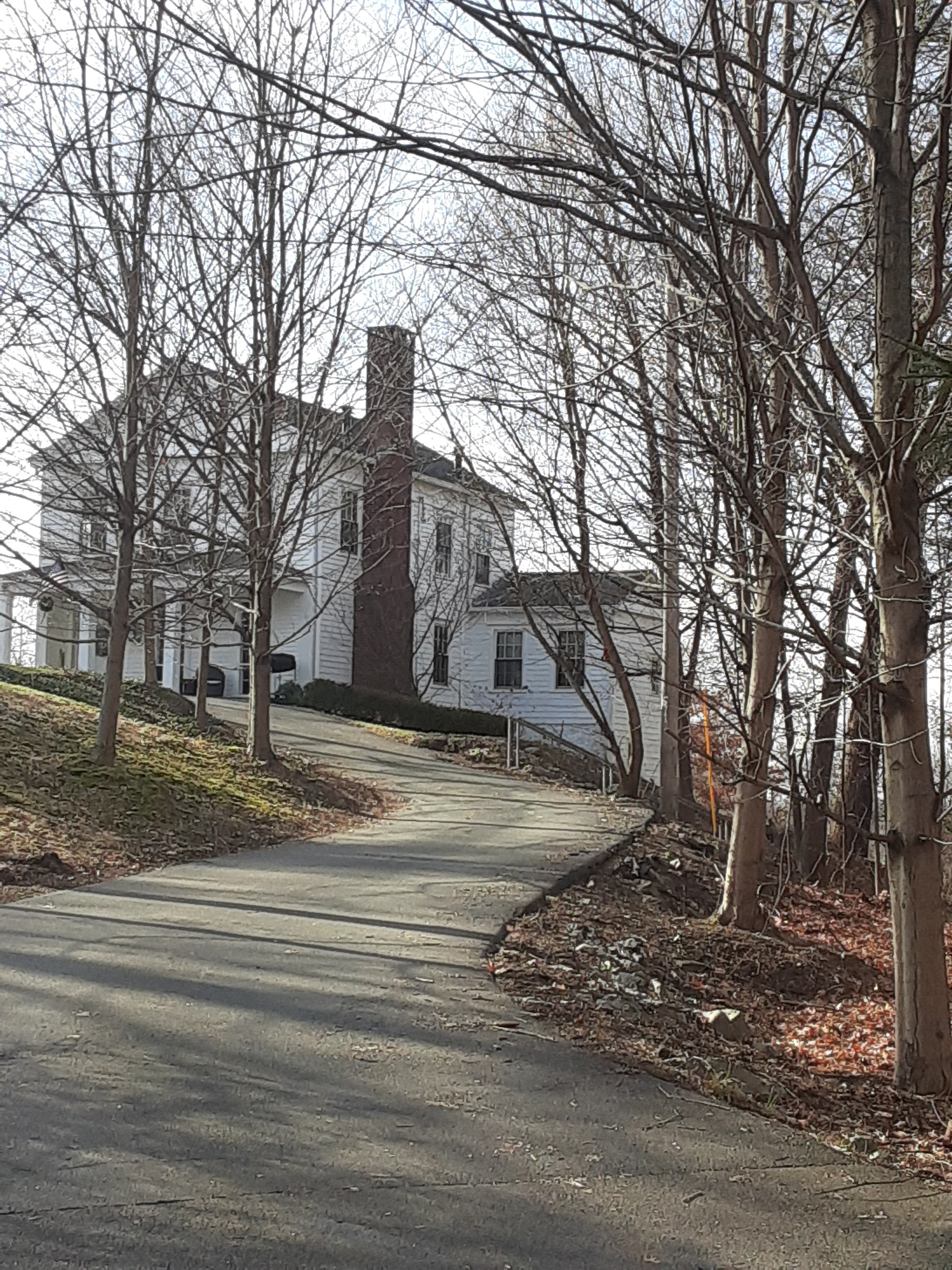

- Location within New York Location within the United States
- Location: 6163 NY 9H, Claverack, New York
- Coordinates: 42°13′8.82″N 73°44′7.13″W
- Area: 2.5 acres (1.0 ha)
- Built: 1846
- Architectural style: Greek Revival, Mid 19th Century Revival
- MPS: Claverack MPS
- NRHP reference No.: 97000949
- Added to NRHP: August 21, 1997

Rev. Dr. Elbert S. Porter House, also known as "Oakledge", is a historic home located at Claverack in Columbia County, New York. It was built in 1846, and is a Greek Revival–style residence. It is a 2-story, three-by-two-bay, side entry frame dwelling with a single-storied square-columned porch spanning the facade. The 2-story main block is flanked by small single-story wings.

It was added to the National Register of Historic Places in 1997.
