= Claverack College =

Former Boarding School in Claverack, New York

Coordinates: 42°13′36″N 73°44′1″W

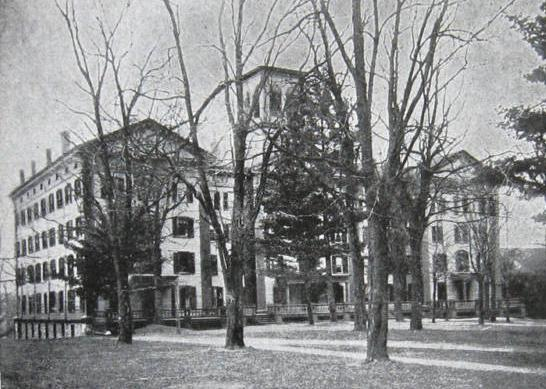
Claverack College campus, c. 1900 postcard

Claverack College, also known as Washington Seminary and Hudson River Institute, was a coeducational boarding school in Claverack, New York, United States. Founded as a boys' academy, it operated from 1779 until 1902. It added a girls' school in the mid-19th century.

== History ==
The school was founded as the Washington Seminary during the American Revolution in 1779 by Rev. John Gabriel Gebhard, the pastor of the Reformed Dutch Church of Claverack. In 1830 the school was renamed Claverack Academy. In 1854 it became Claverack College (a quasi-military academy for boys). The associated Hudson River Institute was founded in the mid-19th century as a school for girls. The classes and dormitories were located in handsome stone buildings.

In 1890, student Stephen Crane, who later became a prominent author, published his first article in the February 1890 Claverack College Vidette. It was about explorer Henry M. Stanley's quest in Africa to find the English missionary David Livingstone.

In the 1870s students from Claverack and Hudson River Institute often made marriage matches with each other. One such marriage was that of Edward George Johnson, son of a Manhattan businessman, and Eugenia Ramacciotti, daughter of Francis Ramacciotti and his wife.

The school was for wealthy families: Tuition in 1875 was $400 per year, the equivalent of a year's pay for most people. Its 22-acre (8.9 ha) campus was just south of the Reformed Dutch Church of Claverack. Today NY 9H passes along its west side.

Claverack College closed in 1902. After its closure the land was divided and sold, and the buildings razed. The George Felpel House, located on the western half of the property, was built using some of the stones saved from the school's structures.

== Notable alumni and faculty ==
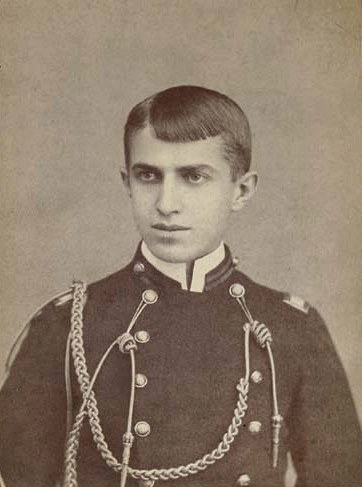
Cadet Stephen Crane in uniform at the age of 17

- Richard M. Blatchford, U.S. Army general in World War I
- John Clum, US Indian Agent to the Apache, publisher of The Tombstone Epitaph, mayor of Tombstone, Arizona, and friend of Virgil and Wyatt Earp.
- Stephen Crane, author (he said his time at Claverack was among the happiest years in his life)
- Wm. Knight, Wisconsin businessman and elected official
- Killian Miller, U.S. Representative
- Robert H. Morris (mayor), mayor of New York City
- Margaret Sanger, women's rights advocate
- Martin Van Buren, 8th U.S. President
- General John P. Van Ness, U.S. Representative
- William P. Van Ness, U.S. District Judge
- Cornelius P. Van Ness, Governor of Vermont
- General Jacob Rutsen Van Rensselaer, New York Secretary of State
- Ada Josephine Todd (1858–1904), author and educator
- Alexander Russell Webb, U.S. Ambassador to Philippines, early American Muslim
- William J. Leggett, Captain of the Rutgers team in the first College football game.
