= William Henry Ludlow House =

Historic house in New York, United States

- U.S. National Register of Historic Places
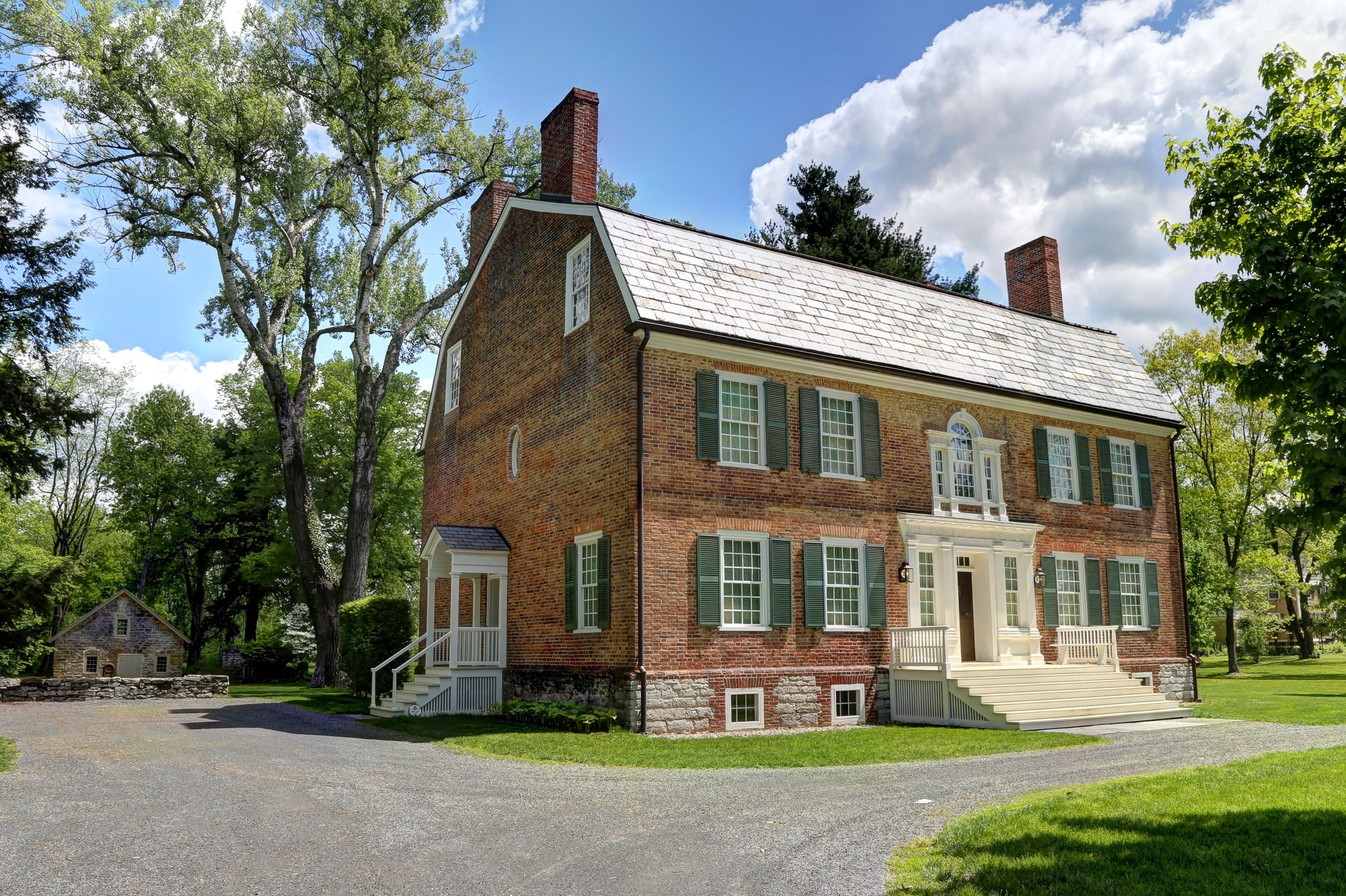
- West profile and south elevation, 2014

- Location within New York Location within the United States
- Location: Claverack, NY
- Nearest city: Hudson, NY
- Coordinates: 42°13′29″N 73°44′46″W
- Area: 20 acres (8.1 ha)
- Built: 1786
- Architectural style: Georgian
- MPS: Claverack MPS
- NRHP reference No.: 97000826
- Added to NRHP: August 8, 1997

William Henry Ludlow House is a historic home located at Claverack in Columbia County, New York, next to the Ludlow-Van Rensselaer House. It was built in 1786 and is a Georgian-style residence. It is a 2 1/2-story, five-bay center-entrance, brick dwelling. The south facade features a finely crafted Palladian window. Also on the property are four large stone gate posts and an original mile marker. There are 10 fireplaces. Outbuildings include the original summer kitchen, root cellar, ice house and a new carriage house. The house underwent a historically correct restoration in 2011.

William Henry Ludlow (1740-1803) was a New York merchant who came to Claverack to escape the British occupation of the city during the Revolution. As a prominent Federalist, William Ludlow entertained Supreme Court Justice John Jay in the house in the spring of 1789. The Ludlow House was a precursor to what became known as the Federal style of American architecture. He is buried in The Claverack Dutch Reformed Churchyard. It was added to the National Register of Historic Places in 1997.

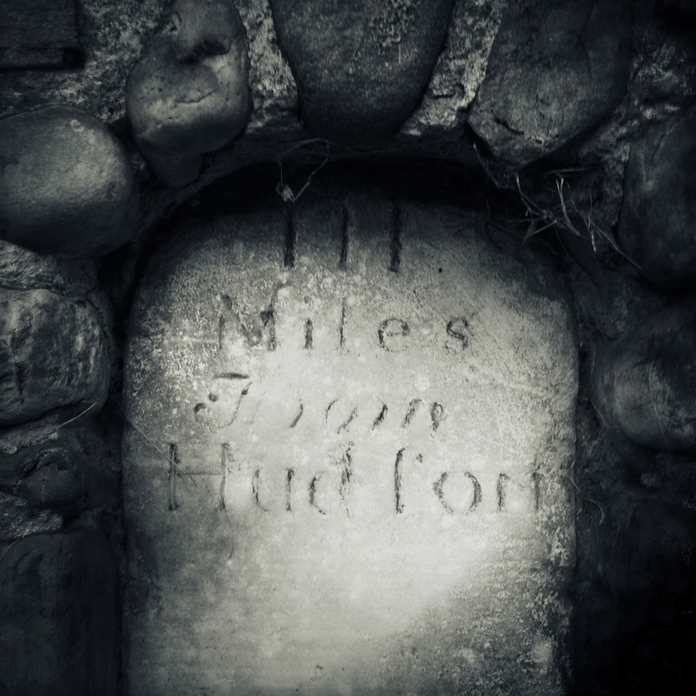
An 18th-century mile marker, denoting the house's location at 505 Route 23B in Hudson.

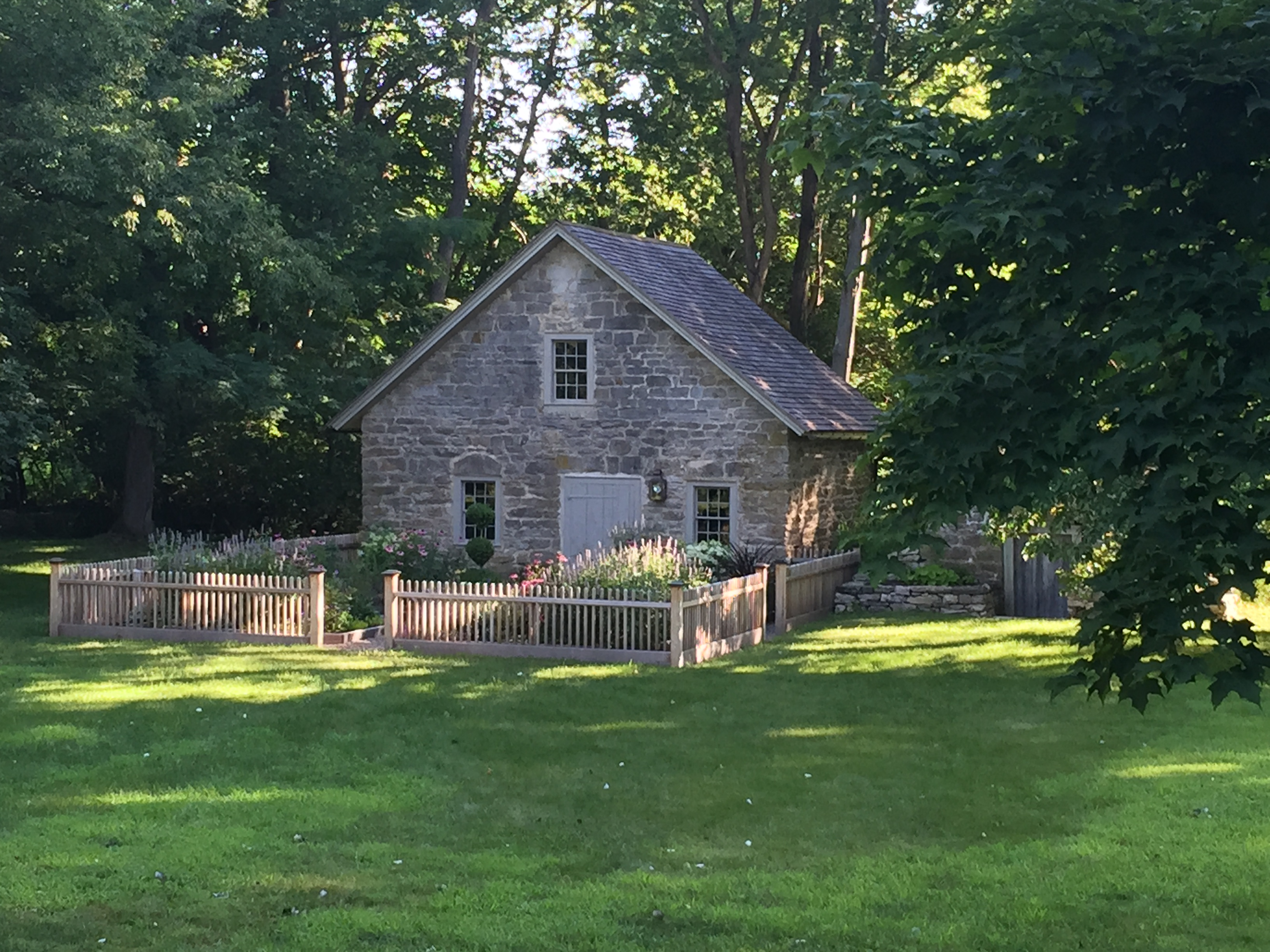
Summer Kitchen

The property was previously owned by Academy Award-winning film producer Peter Spears and his husband, Brian Swardstrom; they purchased the home in 2009 and sold it in 2012. It remains a private residence.

== See also ==
- National Register of Historic Places listings in Columbia County, New York
