= Ludlow-Van Rensselaer House =

Historic house in New York, United States

- U.S. National Register of Historic Places
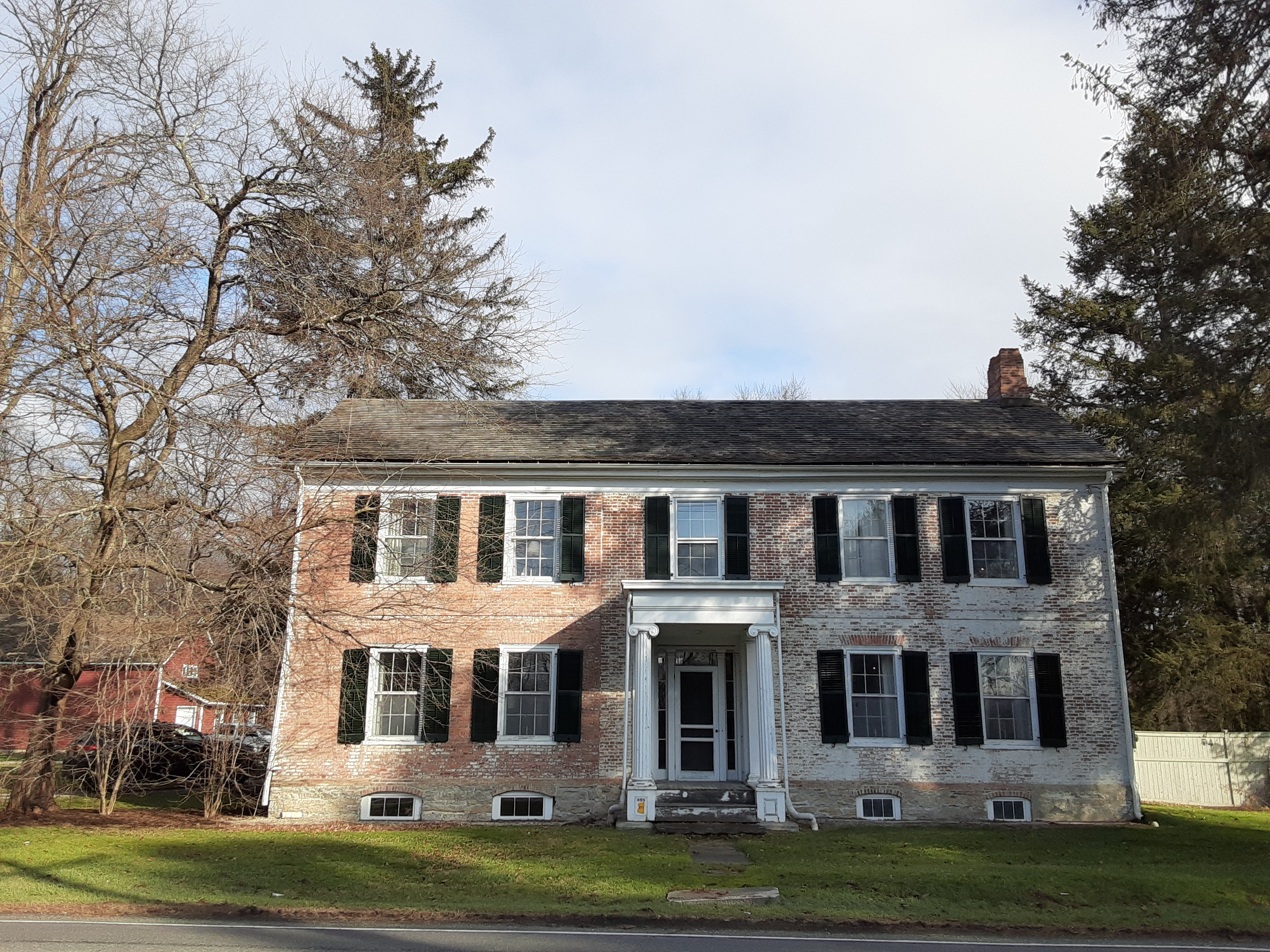

- Location within New York Location within the United States
- Location: 495 NY 23B, Claverack, New York
- Coordinates: 42°13′31″N 73°44′48″W
- Area: 5 acres (2.0 ha)
- Built: 1774
- Architectural style: Early Republic, Federal
- MPS: Claverack MPS
- NRHP reference No.: 97000945
- Added to NRHP: August 21, 1997

Ludlow-Van Rensselaer House is a historic home located at Claverack in Columbia County, New York, next to the William Henry Ludlow House. It was built in 1774 and is a 2-story, five-by-one-bay center entrance, brick dwelling with a gable roof. It has a 2-story gable-roofed rear wing. The entry features a finely crafted portico composed of Ionic order columns supporting a wide entablature and shallow pitched roof.

It was added to the National Register of Historic Places in 1997.
