= Daniela Bertol =

Italian architect, artist

- Born: Rome, Italy
- Education: Master's degree in Architecture (Rome)
- Occupations: Architect, Designer, Artist
- Known for: Interdisciplinary projects at the intersection of art and science, land art, geoglyphs, digital models, sustainable design (Sky Spirals, Sun Farm)
- Style: Integrating art, science, architecture, and design; incorporating eastern philosophies and sustainable principles

Daniela Bertol is an Italian architect, designer, and artist. Her projects encompass several disciplines and media including astronomy, land art, geoglyphs, architecture, digital models, photography and video.

== Biography ==
Daniela Bertol was born in Rome, Italy. She earned a master's degree in architecture and then moved to the United States in 1985. Her early projects explored geometric space and virtual environments using digital model, using organic shapes similar to those found in nature.

Bertol founded space ink in 1989 as a multidisciplinary laboratory embracing experimentally built and published projects as well as theoretical works focusing on the transformation of architecture and its integration with digital space.

Bertol's most recent project is Sky Spirals, a series of places devoted to sustainable design and the shaping of the landscape based on intersecting spirals that follow solar and celestial alignments. Sky Spirals began as a conceptual work based on digital models, maps, and aerial photos. As the work developed, the virtual model and diagrams were translated to a real physical site in Claverack, New York. They became Sun Farm, the first site of the Sky Spirals concepts. The interest in sustainable architecture has inspired solar-based design.

Bertol's design vision integrates principles of eastern philosophies and practices with contemporary architectural theories and research. A lifelong yoga practitioner, she integrates spiritual practices into her art.

Bertol is lives with her spouse and two daughters in New York and Rome.

== Books ==
- Daniela Bertol, Visualizing with CAD (1994: New York: Springer-Verlag) ISBN 0-387-94275-0
- Daniela Bertol and David Foell, Designing Digital Space (1996: New York: John Wiley & Sons) ISBN 0-471-14662-5

== References and external links ==
- official web site
- space ink web site
