= Hollowville, New York =

- Hamlet
- Location within New York Location within the United States
- Coordinates: 42°12′19″N 73°41′28″W
- Country: United States
- State: New York
- County: Columbia
- Elevation: 325 ft (99 m)
- Time zone: UTC-5 (Eastern (EST))
  - Summer (DST): UTC-4 (EDT)
- ZIP code: 12530
- Area codes: 518 & 838
- GNIS feature ID: 953007

Hollowville is a hamlet in Columbia County, New York, United States. The community is 6.1 miles (9.8 km) east-southeast of Hudson. Hollowville has a post office with ZIP code 12530.
