= George Felpel House =

Historic house in New York, United States

- U.S. National Register of Historic Places
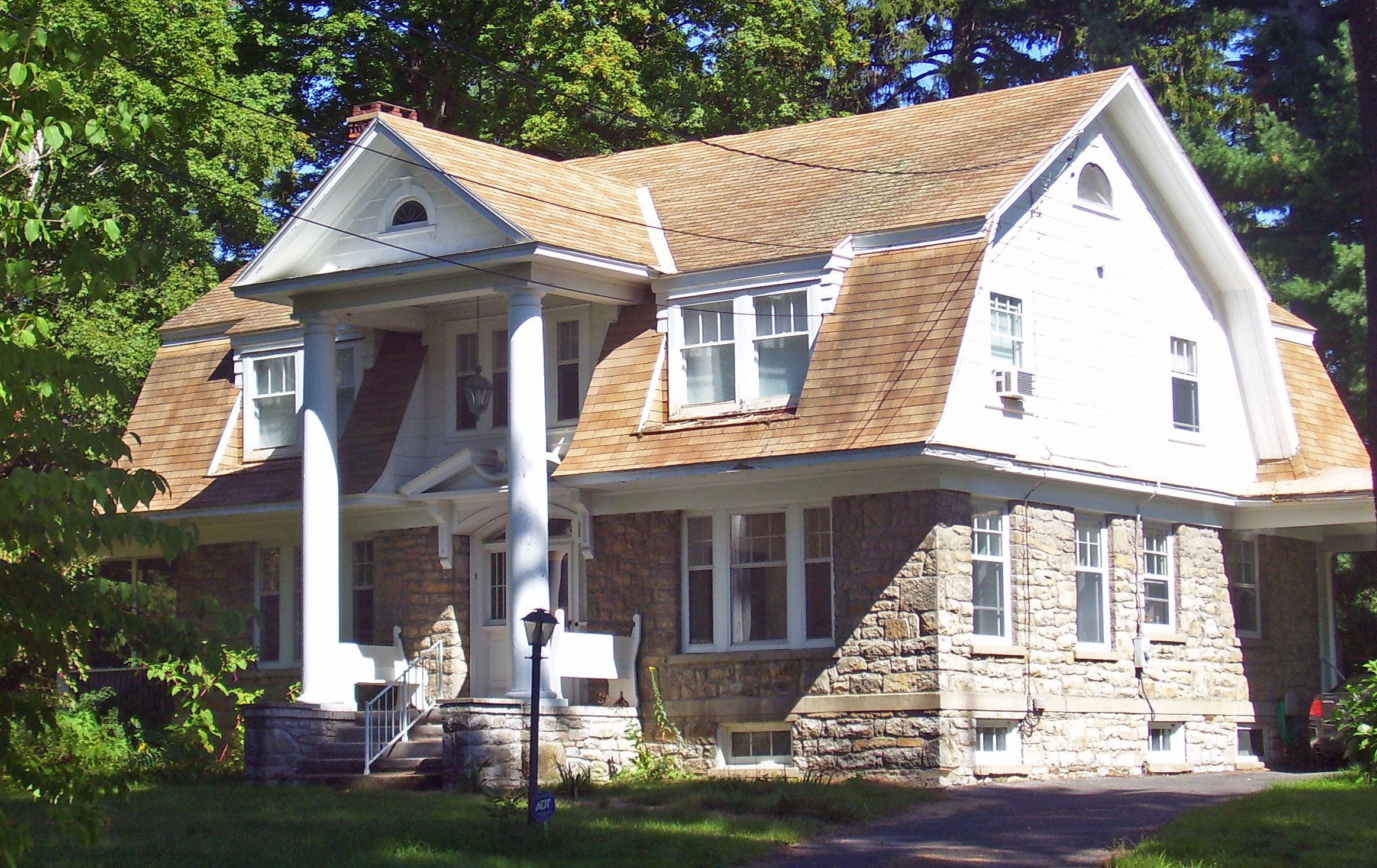
- West elevation and south profile, 2008

- Location within New York Location within the United States
- Location: Claverack-Red Mills, New York
- Nearest city: Hudson
- Coordinates: 42°13′36″N 73°44′1″W
- Area: 11 acres (4.5 ha)
- Built: 1922
- Architect: Henry L. Moul
- Architectural style: Colonial Revival, Dutch Colonial Revival
- MPS: The Architectural and Historic Resources of the Hamlet of Claverack, Columbia County, New York
- NRHP reference No.: 97000927
- Added to NRHP: August 21, 1997

The George Felpel House is located on NY 9H in Claverack-Red Mills, New York, United States. It is a stone Colonial Revival and Dutch Colonial Revival house built in the 1920s.

Its stones are the remnants of Claverack College, which existed on the property from 1779 to 1902. Local architect Henry Mouls designed it in Colonial Revival style, with some aspects of genuine Colonial architecture from the region. In 1997 it was listed on the National Register of Historic Places.

== Property ==
The house is on an 11-acre (4.5 ha) lot on the east side of Route 9H just south of the Reformed Dutch Church of Claverack. It is set back from the road, on the top of a low ruse, at the end of the north fork of an unpaved Y-shaped driveway. At the other fork is a garage, the other contributing resource to the Register listing. There are many mature trees around the lot, providing shade and screening. The rear slopes down to a pond that was once part of the college campus. The surrounding neighborhood has other older larger houses on large lots.

The building itself is a two-story, three-bay structure topped by an asphalt-shingled gambrel roof. It is sided in rough-dressed local stone, except for asbestos shingles in the gable ends. A porte cochère projects from the south entrance, and on the east (rear) is another gambrel-roofed wing. A screened porch is on the north end.

At the center of the west (front) facade is the entrance portico. Its pedimented roof, two stories high, is supported by two Doric columns. An overscaled broken pediment on brackets shelters the main entrance. A triple window is above the main entrance on the second story.

The main entrance is a Dutch door with a glass transom. It leads into a large central hall with a prominent staircase. Its bannister and newels reflect the Arts and Crafts style; all the other woodwork in the house is Colonial Revival.

To the north of the central hall is a large living room. Its fireplace has a wooden Federal style mantel flanked by French doors which lead to the porch. The other side of the house has a dining room and front room with similar windows to the living room. The kitchen wing to the south has original cabinetry. The upstairs rooms are planned similarly to their downstairs counterparts.

Outside, the garage has a hipped roof and clapboard siding. It has been extended to the east to accommodate longer vehicles. There is also a modern shed, and a modern wellhouse-styled structure covering a cistern used by the college in the rear lawn. Some of the original drain tiles from the diversionary channel have been found in the nearby soil.

== History ==
Claverack College, also known as Washington Seminary and Hudson River Institute, was founded by Reformed Church pastor John Gabriel Gebhard during the Revolutionary War. It was located on the property (and an adjacent, similarly sized parcel) until its closure in 1902. During its existence, it educated Martin van Buren, Margaret Sanger and Stephen Crane. The buildings were razed shortly after it was closed.

Some of the stones they were built of remained, and when George Felpel, a successful farmer from nearby Ghent, bought half of the former campus, he wanted to use them. He hired Gloversville architect Henry Moul, who had recently moved there from Hudson, near Claverack, to design a stone house in the newly popular Colonial Revival mode.

Moul's design was extremely sensitive to local architectural traditions from the Colonial era. It had many features typical of Colonial Revival buildings, such as the colonnade, pediment, ornamented entry and central-hall plan. But it also uses some distinctly regional touches, such as the triple-run interior stairway. Common in many early Dutch houses in the Hudson Valley, they have rarely been preserved. On the outside he used the gambrel roof, an English feature later copied by the Dutch, and stoep benches flanking the entrance, similar to those seen on old engravings of streets in Albany.

The building has remained a residence ever since. It has not been significantly altered by any other owner, save the addition of the mock wellhouse.

== See also ==
- National Register of Historic Places listings in Columbia County, New York
