= Reformed Dutch Church of Claverack =

Historic church in New York, United States

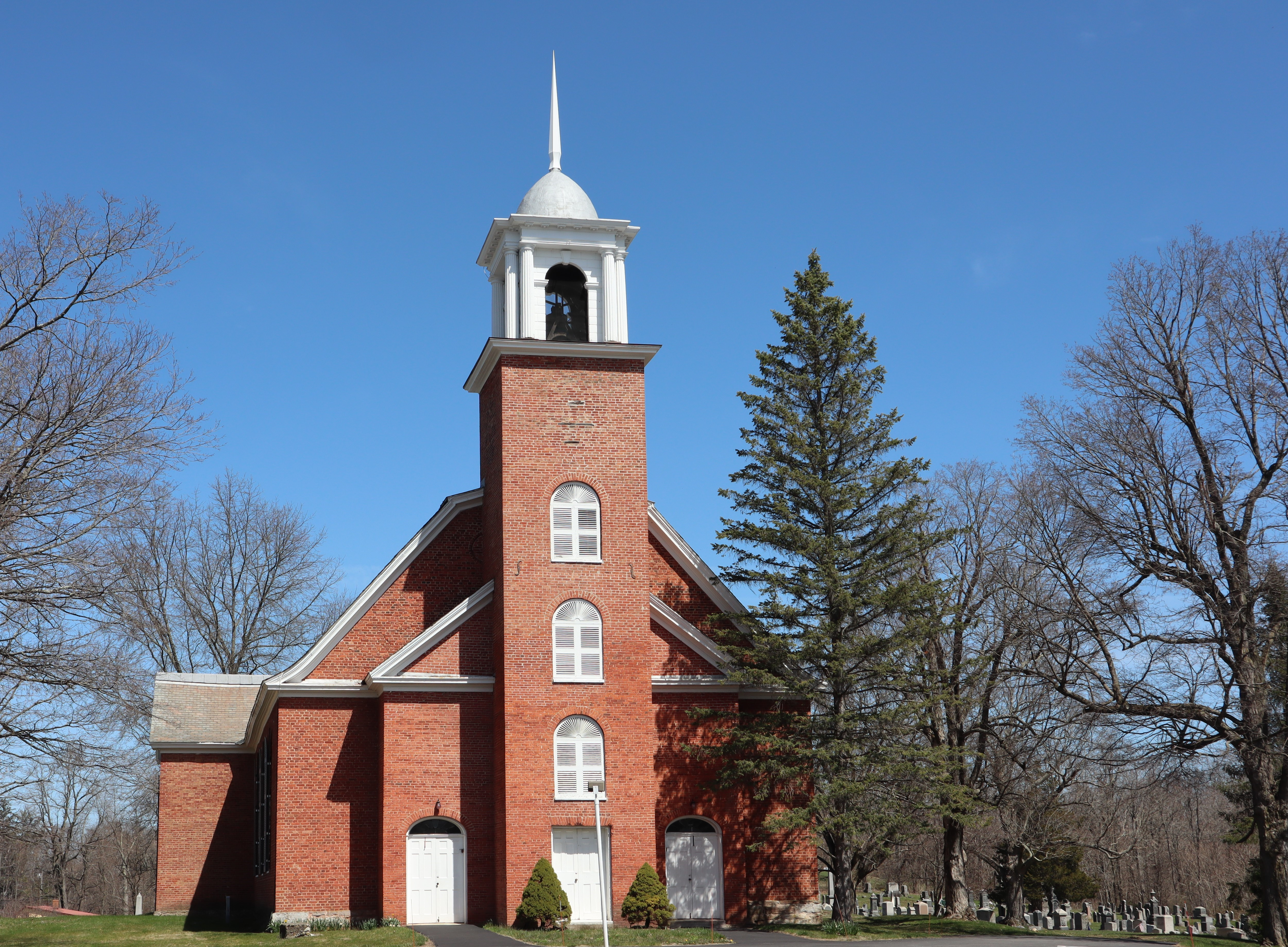
- The church and cemetery in 2024

Religion
- Affiliation: Reformed Church in America
- Leadership: The Rev. Linda J. Miles
- Year consecrated: 1767

Location
- Location: Claverack, NY, USA
- Interactive map of Reformed Dutch Church of Claverack
- Coordinates: 42°13′42″N 73°44′0″W

Architecture
- Type: Church
- General contractor: Solomon Strong
- Groundbreaking: 1767
- Completed: 1767

Specifications
- Direction of façade: south
- Length: 70 feet (21 m)
- Width: 96 feet (29 m)
- Materials: brick, stone, wood

U.S. National Register of Historic Places
- Added to NRHP: 2001
- NRHP Reference no.: 01000673

Website
- Reformed Dutch Church of Claverack

The Reformed Dutch Church of Claverack is located at the north end of the hamlet of Claverack, New York, United States. The congregation was founded in 1716. The brick church was built in the mid-18th century and renovated and expanded twice in the 19th, reaching its present form in 1879. New York State Route 9 H passes by it.

The church is the oldest institutional building in Columbia County. Its early congregations were made up of ethnic Dutch and German Protestant colonists. In 2001 it was listed on the National Register of Historic Places, along with several of its other buildings and cemetery. The dead buried there include one of George Washington's aides and a former speaker of the state assembly.

== Property ==
The church complex is on a 17.2-acre (7.0 ha) parcel of land on the east side of Route 9H, roughly 650 feet (200 m) north of its junction with routes 23 and 23B in the center of Claverack. It is on a small rise about 75 feet (23 m) from the road, sheltered by mature trees around a paved driveway and parking lot. The surrounding area is rural to the north and residential, with large lots, to the south. In that direction, on the same side of Route 9H, is the George Felpel House, also on the Register.

There are three buildings, a garage, parsonage and the Christian Education Center, to its south. The cemetery, which takes up most of the property, is to the north with a small stone shed in the middle. All the buildings on the property, except the Christian Education Center and the cemetery, are considered contributing resources to the National Register listing.

=== Church ===
==== Exterior ====
The one-story church building is faced in brick laid in English bond on a stone foundation with steeply pitched gambrel roof with boxed cornice and long lower slopes flared at the bottom. The main block is 70 by 96 feet (21 by 29 m) with a two-stage, four-story centrally located tower on the south (front) elevation. Near the rear are two small wings on either side that serve as a transept. Both have entrances. The north has a projection for the apse. Two small exterior chimneys rise on this side.

On the south facade, the tower is joined to the main block by a three-bay pedimented gabled projecting front section. The tower's double paneled door, and the similar doors with segmental arches flanking it on the projection, are the church's main entrances. Its brick is laid in common bond. Three louvered round-arched openings are on each story of the south face of the tower. Openings that once existed on three sides of the fourth story have been visibly bricked over. A deep cornice supports the square belfry, where paired fluted Doric columns flanking rusticated round-arched openings support a domed roof with tall finial.

The east and west elevations have three tall rounded-arch windows apiece south of the transept wings, flanked by louvered wood blinds. The west further has the numerals "1767" above the windows, in brick painted to look like iron. The north side has two windows similar to those on the other elevations in each wing, and two small oval windows in the gable.

==== Interior ====
From the tower entrance, a vestibule with stairs up either side of the tower leads to another pair of double doors, which open into the barrel-vaulted sanctuary. It is finished primarily in white plaster on lath with simple woodwork trim. Two aisles allow access to the pews, with paneled ends, curved tops and paneled doors. Along both sides are balconies supported by decorative cast iron columns.

At the north end is the raised pulpit, in a niche between paired pilasters below a semi-circular pediment. The stairs to the choir loft have S-curved newels at either end. The wooden Gothic Revival case for the church's original pipe organ is along the loft's south wall.

=== Outbuildings ===
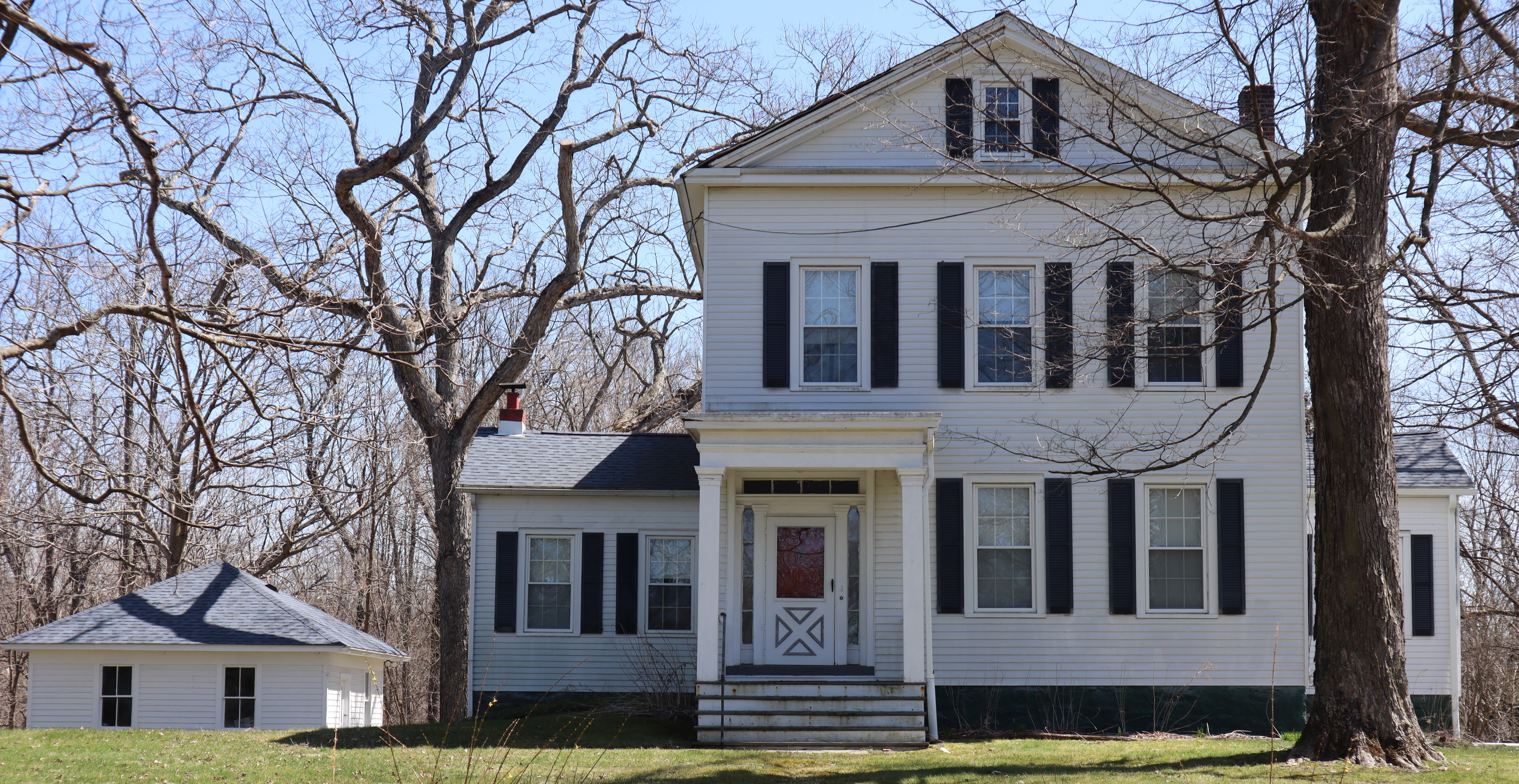
Parsonage and garage in 2024

Immediately to the southeast of the church is the Christian Education Center. It is a two-story brick building in the Colonial Revival style with a gabled roof and a small entrance wing on its southwest. While it is sympathetic to the church, it is of modern construction and therefore non-contributing.

About 400 feet (120 m) to the south, across two parking lots, is the parsonage. It is a three-bay, two-story frame house sided in vinyl with a pedimented front gable and single-bay entrance porch on the northern bay with square piers. The western two bays on the north and south have one-story gabled wings, and there is a two-story porch on the east. Brick chimneys rise from the north end of the north wing and the middle of the south elevation.

Inside, there is an open fireplace in the basement and a hand pump by the door. The interior has not been altered save for the addition of a powder room on the first floor. The exterior windows have been replaced with similarly designed modern counterparts.

To its northeast is a small frame garage with a hipped roof. It was built in the early 20th century, and is considered contributing. The only other contributing outbuilding is a small stone shed in the middle of the cemetery, 50 feet (15 m) north of the church. It, too, was built at the beginning of the 20th century.

=== Cemetery ===
The cemetery takes up 12.7 acres (5.1 ha) of the church's overall property. It is mostly located to the north, but comes down to the east and west of the church. It is laid out in a grid pattern, with narrow grassy unpaved roads offering access should a vehicle be needed.

Gravestones date from the 18th century to the present, with some particularly well-executed marble headstones from the early 19th century. To the immediate west of the church are some stone vaults built into the rise.

==== Significant burials ====
- Gen. Samuel Blachley Webb (1753–1807). Led a militia company from Wethersfield, Connecticut, that saw action at Bunker Hill. He became one of George Washington's aides-de-camp for six months, then went into combat again, at Long Island, White Plains and Trenton, getting wounded at the latter two engagements. He was captured by the British in December 1777, exchanged a year later, and settled in Claverack after the war.
- Jacob Rutsen Van Rensselaer, (1767–1835). A prominent Federalist elected to nine terms in the State Assembly, serving as that body's speaker in his last. Left that position to commanded locally raised troops which guarded New York City during the War of 1812. After the end of the war served as New York's Secretary of State and later an influential delegate to the state's 1821 constitutional convention.
- Harriet Livingston Dale (1785–1826). Robert Fulton's widow moved to England after his death. After hers, her body was returned to Claverack for burial.

== History ==
The church's history can be divided into three eras. From its founding until the years just before the Revolution, the church was a congregation in search of a permanent building. Over the next century of its existence, it developed that building from a simple brick church into the complex structure it is today. Since then it has perfected and maintained that structure.

=== 1716–1767: The early years ===
Claverack's church, among the first Dutch Reformed Churches organized in the Hudson Valley, began in 1716 as one preaching station on a circuit that ranged from Claverack Landing on the Hudson River (now the city of Hudson) in the west to Hillsdale in the east. In 1727 the first church was built, near what is today the First Columbia County Courthouse.

Palatine German settlers in the region, who were also Protestants in the Reform tradition, began to swell the congregation's ranks. Within four decades a new church was needed. Stephen van Rensselaer deeded the current parcel to the church in February 1767; by November of that year a local builder named Solomon Strong had completed the church and it was dedicated for use. Van Rensselaer family tradition holds that the bricks were imported from the Netherlands by Hendrick van Rensselaer; however this is unlikely as a kiln was at the time located less than a mile (1.6 km) away. The bricks in the church match those of other local structures known to have been built of bricks baked at that kiln.

The original church was a much smaller building. It consisted only of the southernmost 30 feet (10 m) of the present structure without the projecting front pedimented gable or tower. A receipt in church records suggests there was a small wooden steeple and bell.

=== 1768–1879: Growth and development ===
Within a decade of the new church's construction, the congregation got its most influential pastor. At the beginning of the Revolution, John Gabriel Gebhard had fled first New York City, then Kingston following the British burning of the city in October 1777. He took refuge in Claverack and became the church's pastor.

With the war still on, he initiated the founding and construction of Washington Seminary on the property to the south of the church in 1779. Later, it became known as Claverack College, educating Martin van Buren, Stephen Crane and Margaret Sanger before closing in 1902, by which time it was known as Hudson River Institute.

The year after the college was founded, the first change was made to the church when doors were put on the pews to help retain warmth from the foot stoves worshippers brought in the winter months. In 1810, the church installed a tin stove so that worshippers would no longer have to bring them.

Six years later, in 1816, the church had begun to grow again and realized it needed more space. Expansions over the next decade added the present north section and wings onto the old church, with exits to the cemetery at the rear. Inside, the balconies, choir loft and iron columns were added, and the walls replastered. The pews were rearranged into their present layout. Finally, in 1828, the bell tower was added in memory of Gebhard, who had died the previous year after 50 years as pastor.

The parsonage was designed and built in 1844, the first significant building on the church property besides the church itself. Ten years after that, the church's interior was redone. The north end was extended again, the floor was lowered, and walls and floors refinished. The pews were rearranged again so that they all faced the north end, and the choir loft built there (a planned gallery at that end was dropped).

In the next decade, the church's musical needs were attended to. The first organ was installed in 1867, to be replaced by a pipe organ five years later. Seven years later, in 1879, the 1,500-pound (680 kg) bell, cast by the Meneely Bell Foundry in West Troy (now Watervliet), was installed. This is considered the last historically significant change to the church building.

=== 1880–present: Balancing history and growth ===
The other two contributing buildings were added around the same time, at the turn of the next century. A garage was built for the parsonage, and a stone shed in the cemetery. Sometime in the new century, modern central heating was installed. After the closure of Claverack College in 1902, its bell was installed at the foot of the church's driveway. It is not considered a contributing resource.

Mid-20th century actions start with the installation in 1930 of electric lights, designed to look like older oil lamps with glass chimneys. A decade later, in 1940, the organ was reconditioned. The sanctuary was carpeted in 1955. An electric toggle switch to ring the bell was installed in 1958, and a new Allen electric organ complemented it the following year.

In 1967, the church erected another building on the property, the Christian Education Center. An architecturally sympathetic building just to the southeast of the main church, it is used for the church offices and many activities, such as Sunday school and meetings, typical of a fellowship hall. A new organ was dedicated in the church in April 2000. Since then there have been no other changes to the property.

== The church today ==
The church's beliefs conform to the Apostles' Creed: "We believe in the trinity – God the Father, his Son Jesus Christ, and the Holy Spirit. The lessons on which we strive to live our lives are found in the Holy Scripture – the Bible, the final authority for our beliefs." It describes its purpose as "'to proclaim the Good News of God's Grace' and strive to increase the love of God in our midst and throughout the world." It has roughly 200 members, and is part of the Columbia-Greene Synod of the Reformed Church in America's Albany Classis. A monthly newsletter, The Fisherman, keeps congregants informed.

In addition to Sunday services and school, it offers Bible study for adults, confirmation classes, and a youth group. It is a sponsoring church of Camp Fowler, a Christian summer camp in the southern Adirondacks. It also hosts local meetings of community groups, such as the Boy and Girl Scouts, as well as Alcoholics Anonymous.

Its handbell and vocal choirs perform in the community in addition to worship services. The church supports several prominent regional charities, including Habitat for Humanity, the Salvation Army and the AIDS Council of Northeastern New York. It has sponsored Reformed Church missionaries in Albania, Taiwan, and Mississippi.

== See also ==
- National Register of Historic Places listings in Columbia County, New York
