= Francis Ramacciotti =

Piano manufacturer and piano string manufacturing inventor

Francis Ramacciotti (c. 1826 Livorno, Grand Duchy of Tuscany – 13 June 1891 Manhattan) was a Grand Duchy of Tuscany-born inventor who founded a major piano string manufacturer in the United States.

== Career ==
Ramacciotti was reportedly associated with Garibaldi and held a military rank. Ramaciotti immigrated to the US in 1848, moving to Buffalo, New York. He apprenticed in a piano company in Buffalo before founding his own piano string company, the F. Ramacciotti company, in 1852. While in Buffalo, Ramociotti played bassoon as a member of the Metropolitan Theater Orchestra under the direction of Albert Benjamin Poppendorf (1819–1900).

Ramacciotti – on June 12, 1952, in Buffalo – married Rachel Caroline Rendt (maiden; 1833–1914) of Detroit. The couple had five children: (i) Italo Francis Ramacciotti (1853–1911), (ii) Hugo Louis Ramacciotti (1855–1907), (iii) Alberto "Albert" De M. Ramacciott (1857–1926), (iv) Eugenia W. Ramacciotti (1860–1938; married to Edward G. Johnson), and (v) Emma Serena Ramacciotti (1869–1963; married to Milton Lockwood Bouden; 1866–1938).

In 1867, Ramaciotti moved his company to New York City. He invented and patented the first modern bass string for the piano. Previous piano strings used iron winding over iron. This modern invention using a special new machine used copper wound over iron. The company was one of the top makers of piano strings in the world for several decades.

In 1891, Francis Ramacciotti died. His son Albert took over the company the next year. Albert expanded it to one of the three top string makers in the nation.

== Selected patents ==
1883: US 280512 A – "Spinning Lathes for Winding Piano-Strings."
1893: US 508974 A – "Machine for Swaging Wire for Musical Instruments."
1902: US 740918 A – "Bass String for Pianos or Other Musical Instruments."

== Bibliography ==
=== References ===
Inline
- "New York City Municipal Deaths, 1795–1949" (database, FamilySearch → searching "Francis Ramacciotti" → DOD: June 13, 1891 → Place of Death: Manhattan → Place of Birth: Leghorn, Italy → Father's name: Joseph Ramacciotti → Death Certificate No. 20407 → Home Address: 213 East 78th St., Manhattan). New York City Municipal Archives. FHL microfilm 1,322,821.
- Scientific American (July 28, 1883). "Mechanical Inventions" (New Series). p. 58 – via Google Books (Penn State).
The Official Gazette of the United States Patent Office
- 1883: US 280512 A – Spinning Lathes for Winding Piano-Strings (filed November 23, 1882; serial number 280,512; granted July 3, 1883), vol. 24, July 3, 1883, p. 39. Retrieved October 14, 2021.
1. Gazette via Google Books (University of Wisconsin).
2. Documents Google Patents.
- 1893: US 508974 A – Machine for Swaging Wire for Musical Instruments (filed October 5, 1892; serial number 447,953; granted November 21, 1893), vol. 65, November 21, 1893, p. 1095. Retrieved October 14, 2021.
1. Gazette via Google Books (University of Wisconsin).
2. Documents Google Patents.
- 1903: US 740918 A – Bass String for Pianos or Other Musical Instruments (filed December 13, 1902; serial number 135,184; granted October 6, 1903), vol. 106, October 6, 1903, pp. 1455–1456. Retrieved October 14, 2021.
1. Gazette via Google Books (Library of Congress).
2. Documents Google Patents.
- Buffalo Times (September 21, 1885). "Francis Ramacciotti Returns to Buffalo". Vol. 3, no. 8. p. 3 – via Newspapers.com. LCCN sn84-31647; OCLC 11217048 (all editions).
- Buffalo Evening News (June 28, 1900). "Albert Poppenberg's Death". The Buffalo News. Vol. 40, no. 67. p. 1 (column 8; bottom) – via Newspapers.com.
General
- Frank E. Morton; William G. Schaff; John Rossi; George Holz; Albert Francis (Alberto "Albert" De M. Ramacciotti; 1857–1926); C.F. Hovey; Dr. Floyd S. Muckey; William Ruhenbeck (1866–1935); Francis Kraus; Justin O. Shore; Mark P. Campbell; Dr. Daniel Russell Hodgdon (1885–1957) (March 5, 1919). "Bass Strings – Their Manufacture and Proper Use". Piano Tone Building – Proceedings of the Piano Technicians' Conference, Chicago, 1919. pp. 19–28 (21, 22, 24, 25) – via Internet Archive (Brigham Young University). OCLC 1050758672 (all editions), 5133516, 220487569.
- Rand's New York City Business Directory for 1877. Vol. 2. New York: Walter Heugh & Co. (publisher). 1877. Retrieved September 23, 2007. OCLC 166590332, 29801355.
1. "Directory listing → "Piano & Harp Strings" "Ramacciotti, Francis"". New York City Business Directory: 249. 1877 – via HathiTrust (Harvard).
- Holmes, Michael Irwin (1941–2016) (1997). "Musical Instruments Made of Aluminum". Mugwumps Instrument Herald. Silver Spring, Maryland.
- "F. Ramacciotti Incorporated" (PDF). The Music Trade Review. 58 (23): 59 (column 1; bottom). June 6, 1914 – via International Arcade Museum, Pasadena, California.
- Underwood, Oscar Wilder (1862–1929), Chairman (1913). "Paragraphs 134–135 — Wire Rods, Wire, Etc". Tariff Schedules – Hearing Before the Committee on Ways and Means – House of Representatives. Vol. 2; Schedule C. Government Printing Office. pp. 1224–1240. LCCN 14-2247; OCLC 853128821 (all editions) & 2903021.
1. Via Google Books (University of Michigan). p. 1239.
2. Via Google Books (UC Davis). p. 1239.
3. Via Google Books (UC Berkeley). p. 1239.
4. Via Google Books (Harvard). p. 1239.
"One day a foreman in the Ramacciotti plant, John —, who had been a boy apprentice when" ... "that was the end of the New York Cooperative Piano String Co."
- Dolge, Alfred (1848–1922) (1911). Pianos and Their Makers: A Comprehensive History of the Development of the Piano From the Monochord to the Concert Grand Player Piano. Covina, California: Covina Publishing Company (publisher). The Quinn & Boden Co. Press (printer). p. 465. LCCN 11-20107; OCLC 1199554 (all editions).
1. Via Google Books (University of Michigan).
2. Via Google Books (Stanford).
3. Via Internet Archive (Stanford). 1911.

		Estab- lished
National Music String Co.	Strings	—	New Brunswick
Celluloid Piano Key Co.	Keys	1876	New York
Tingue, Brown & Co.	Felts	1901	New York
Ramacciotti F.	Strings	1867	New York
Schirmer, Charles	Hardware	1866	New York

- Williams, Charles Miller (1916). Fifty Years of St. Cecile Lodge, No. 568 (2nd ed.). St. Cecile Lodge, No. 568, F. & A.M. LCCN 17-400; OCLC 1045390506 (all editions).
1. Via Internet Archive (Library of Congress). New York, St. Cecile lodge, no. 568, F. & A.M. 1916. p. 146.
" ... Francesco Ramacciotti, who died June 13, [1894]." "The lodge met in a hall corner of Third Avenue and Eighty-Sixth Street." "Ramacciotti joined the lodge in 1871 ... "
- "Ramacciotti F. Inc". Musique-Adresses Universel – Annuaire International du Commerce de Musique [The Universal Music Trade Directory]. Vol. 11. 1928. p. 1540. OCLC 500581814 (all editions).
"Ramacciotti F. Inc, 421 W. 28th St. — Manuf. of Piano Wire and Bass Strings — Panels."
- McAdoo, William Gibbs (1863–1941), Secretary of the Treasury (1916). Treasury Decisions Under Customs and Other Laws. Vol. 29. July–December 1915 (T.D. 35966 – "Drawback on Pianos and Player Pianos"). Government Printing Office. pp. 649–650.
1. Peters, Andrew James (1872–1938), Assistant Secretary (December 11, 1915). T.D. 35966 – "Drawback on Pianos and Player Pianos". p. 650 – via Google Books (University of Michigan).

"The sworn statement of Francis Ramacciotti, dated January 21, 1915, covering bass strings ... "

Note: The petitioner, Albert Francis (Alberto "Albert" De M. Ramacciotti; 1857–1926), was Francis Ramacciotti's son.
