= John Sanders Van Rensselaer =

American lawyer and soldier

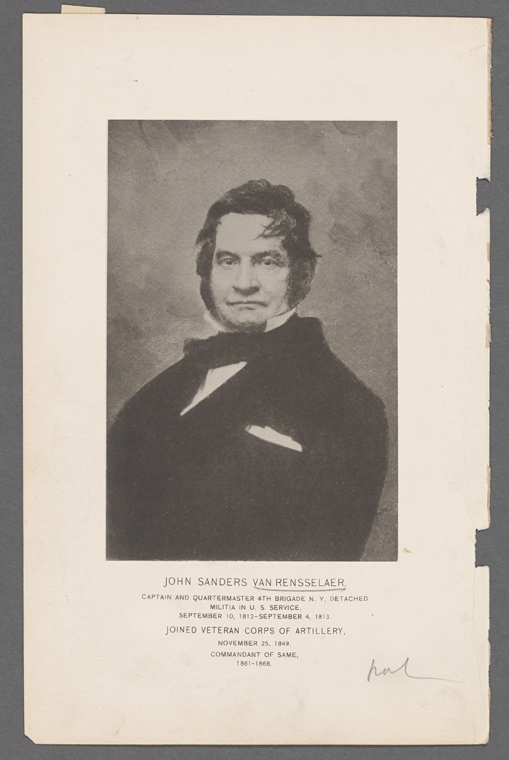
- Born: John Sanders Van Rensselaer; April 10, 1792; New York
- Died: March 19, 1868 (aged 75); Albany, New York
- Education: Union College
- Spouse: Ann Dunkin (m. 1816; died 1845)
- Children: 10, including Charles
- Parent(s): Killian K. Van Rensselaer; Margaretta Sanders

John Sanders Van Rensselaer (April 10, 1792 – March 19, 1868) was an American lawyer and soldier.

== Early life ==
Van Rensselaer was born on April 10, 1792, in New York into the prominent Van Rensselaer family. He was the eldest son of Margaretta "Margaret" (née Sanders) Van Rensselaer (1764–1830) and Killian K. Van Rensselaer, who served as a U.S. Representative from New York from 1801 to 1811. Among his surviving siblings were William Van Rensselaer, Richard Van Rensselaer, and Bernard Sanders Van Rensselaer.

His maternal grandparents were John Sanders and Deborah (née Glen) Sanders. His paternal grandparents were Ariantje "Harriet" (née Schuyler) Van Rensselaer and Col. Kiliaen Van Rensselaer, who fought in the American Revolution leading Van Rensselaer's Regiment when he was wounded during the Battles of Saratoga. Among his large and prominent family were uncles Henry Kiliaen Van Rensselaer, Philip Kiliaen van Rensselaer, and Nicholas Van Rensselaer. His aunt, Catharine Van Rensselaer, married William Henry Ludlow.

At the age of thirteen, he was placed in college in Montreal to learn French where he met many Royalists, including Cornelius Cuyler. He graduated from Union College in 1811, where he "took the honor for the Uranian Oration, and was president of the Philomathean Society."

== Career ==
Van Rensselaer was admitted to bar and began practicing law in New York State in 1812. He also served as an Alderman of Albany.

=== Military service ===
During the War of 1812, Van Rensselaer was commissioned as a Lieutenant, but for most of service, "was attached to the staff of the General Commanding the Northern Division of the State, whose field of duty was in the vicinity of Lake Champlain. As part of Hampton's command, he served as Captain and Quartermaster of the 4th Brigade New York from September 10, 1812, to September 4, 1813.

In November 25, 1849, he joined Veteran Corps of Artillery of the State of New York and was commandant of the Veteran Corps from 1861 until his death in 1868.

== Personal life ==
On March 12, 1816, Van Rensselaer was married to Ann Dunkin (1795–1845) in Philadelphia, Pennsylvania. She was a daughter of Robert Henry Dunkin (a nephew of Chief-Justice Sir William Dunkin) and Elizabeth (née Watkins) Dunkin. Together, they were the parents of four sons and six daughters, including:

- Dunkin Henry van Rensselaer (1817–1819), who died young.
- Maunsell van Rensselaer (1819–1900), an Episcopal priest and author who married Sarah Ann Taylor.
- Margaretta Sanders Van Rensselaer (1821–1879), who married Joseph W. Russell.
- Charles Watkins Van Rensselaer (1823–1857), First Officer of the Central America, which was lost off Cape Hatteras in a hurricane in 1857.
- Ann Eliza Van Rensselaer (1825–1910), who married Dr. Alexander Henry Hoff in 1847.
- Lydia Beekman Van Rensselaer (1827–1903), who married banker John Sill in 1849.
- Harriet Letitia Van Rensselaer (1830–1902), who married lawyer and novelist Leonard Kip.
- Samuel Watkins van Rensselaer (1832–1839), who died young.
- Catherine Sanders Van Rensselaer (1834–1909), who married Confederate officer, Col. Robert Johnston in 1857; he was an aide to Gen. Robert E. Lee and his cousin, Gen. George Pickett.
- Louisa Van Rensselaer (1838–1862), who married Charles de Kay Townsend.

After a brief illness, Van Rensselaer died on March 19, 1868, in Albany, New York.
