= Leonard Gansevoort =

American politician (1751–1810)

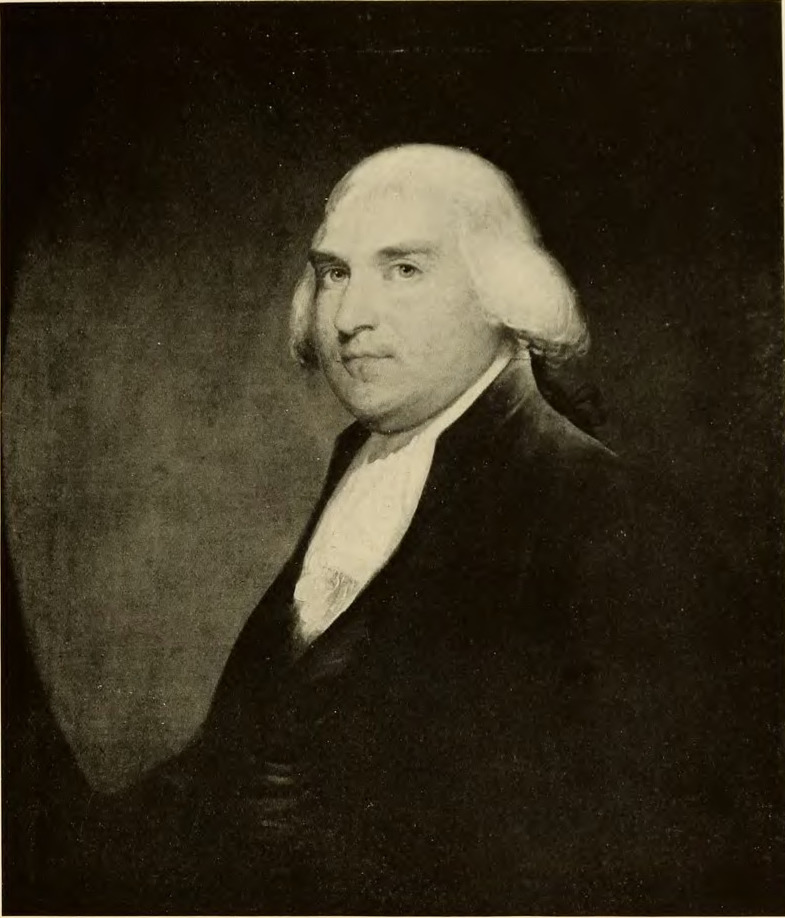
- Portrait of Leonard Gansevoort by Gilbert Stuart

Member of the New York State Senate from the Eastern District
- In office July 1, 1796 – June 30, 1802
- Preceded by: Seat created
- Succeeded by: Seat eliminated

Member of the New York State Senate from the Western District
- In office July 1, 1790 – June 30, 1793
- Preceded by: Philip Schuyler
- Succeeded by: Michael Myers

Member of the New York State Assembly from Albany Co.
- In office July 1, 1787 – June 30, 1788
- In office July 14, 1778 – June 30, 1779

Personal details
- Born: July 14, 1751 Albany, Province of New York, British America
- Died: August 26, 1810 (aged 59) Albany, New York, U.S.
- Resting place: Albany Rural Cemetery, Menands, New York
- Party: Federalist
- Spouse: Hester Cuyler (m. 1770)
- Relations: Peter Gansevoort (brother); Guert Gansevoort (nephew)
- Children: 5
- Parent(s): Harmen Gansevoort; Magdalena Douw

Leendert "Leonard" Gansevoort (July 14, 1751 – August 26, 1810) was an American political leader from New York who served as a delegate to the Continental Congress in 1788.

== Early life ==
He was born in 1751 in Albany County, New York to Harmen Gansevoort (1712–1801) and Magdalena Douw Gansevoort (1718–1796), both from prominent Dutch families. He was the younger brother of Brig. Gen. Peter Gansevoort (1749–1812).

Gansevoort's ancestors had been in Albany since 1660, when it was the Dutch colony of Fort Orange, and Harmen Harmense Gansevoort (ca. 1634–1709) owned a brewery and farms. His brother's son, Peter Gansevoort, Herman Gansevoort (1779–1862) built the Gansevoort Mansion in 1813 on his father's 1,500 acres (6.1 km^{2}) tract at Gansevoort in Saratoga County, New York. His father was the third of his family's generation in America, who were prominent brewers and merchants in Albany.

His mother was descended from the Van Rensselaer family as her mother, Anna Van Rensselaer, was a daughter of Hendrick van Rensselaer (1667–1740), who had married Peter Douw. In addition, his first cousin, Leonard Gansevoort (1754–1834), an Albany lawyer and alderman, was married to Maria Van Rensselaer (1760–1841), the daughter of Col. Kiliaen van Rensselaer (1717–1781), the granddaughter of Hendrick van Rensselaer and the sister of Henry K. Van Rensselaer (1744–1816), Philip Kiliaen van Rensselaer (1747–1798), and Killian K. Van Rensselaer (1763–1845).

== Career ==
After the outbreak of the Revolutionary War, he became a member of the Albany Committee of Correspondence serving as treasurer until November 1775. When the 2nd New York Provincial Congress convened in New York City on December 6, 1775, he was one of the twelve deputies elected by the Albany Committee.

He wrote to his brother, Peter on October 31, 1775, stating:

"Dr Brother
I can hardly express my Distress upon receiving a Letter from Mr James Van Rensselaer acquainting me with your indisposition and that you in consequence thereof had been obliged to leave Chanblee and that you was then in Coll: Biddels Camp on the North side of St John's; every thing seem'd to consire to confirm me in the Opinion that you must have been very ill you cannot be ignorant of the Emotions in my Breast when you consider that Fraternal Affection which has always subsisted between us, and in what Manner I must have also felt when prompted by Duty I communicated the Contents of the Letter to our Joint Parents, I was oblig'd to meliorate the News by telling them that your indisposition was the Fever Ague but do assure you that upon reading the Letter from the same Gent. to Mr Philip Van Rensselaer that tho' you was then yet pretty Weak you was greatly recovered, I seem'd to be rais'd from the lowest Abyss of dispondence to the highest pinnacle of Hope and I will leave you to reflect how industrious I was to communicate it to the old people - I beg Dear Brother as you Love your Friends who are under the greatest uneasiness yet that you will write us a Line if you are able, and if not procure some one to write for you - and beg further that if you are not recovered on receipt of this that you will apply for leave to come down and write me before you set out that I may meet you on your Way - I should have been up with you already If I could possibly have obtained leave of Hetty
We are well I am Your loving Brother
Leonard Gansevoort
Albany Octr 31 1774
To Peter Gansevoort Junr Esqr [Provincial Camp at St Johns]"

He was also appointed to the 3rd and 4th Provincial Congresses in 1776 and 1777, where the Constitution of the State of New York was adopted on April 20, 1777. From April 18, 1777, to May 14, 1777, he was the president of the New York Provincial Congress committee of safety.

Following the end of Revolution in 1789, he bought a country house and estate known as Whitehall, which was located a mile and a half from Albany, from John Bradstreet Schuyler, the son of Philip Schuyler. Gansevoort was known for his entertainment of many prominent state and national political figures. In 1778 and 1779, he served as a member of the New York State Assembly.

Early in his political career he was aligned with the patrician group of the large estates owners and commercial interests, but later became involved with the early evolution of the Democratic Party in New York. He served in the State Assembly again from 1787 to 1788 and in the State Senate from 1791 to 1793 and 1796–1802, where he was chairman of the committee, as a Federalist.

In 1794, he was appointed a colonel in the New York militia. From 1794 to 1797 he was a judge in Albany. From 1799 to 1810, he was a judge of the court of probates.

== Personal life ==
On April 10, 1770, he married Hester Cuyler (1748–1826), the daughter of Abraham Cuyler Jr. (1713–1749), a cousin of Abraham Cuyler, and Jannetje Beekman (1719–1798), a descendant of Wilhelmus Beekman (1623–1707). Together, they had:

- Magdalena Gansevoort (b. 1771)
- Catharina Gansevoort (b. 1772)
- Abraham Cuyler Gansevoort (b. 1775)
- Magdalena Gansevoort (1777–1863), who married Jacob Ten Eyck (1771–1862), on March 6, 1795, the son of Abraham Ten Eyck and grandson of Mayor Jacob Coenraedt Ten Eyck.
- Catharine Cuyler Gansevoort (1789–1853), who married Teunis Van Vechten (1785–1859), nephew of Abraham Van Vechten

He died in 1810 at home in Albany and was buried in Albany Rural Cemetery.

=== Descendants ===
Through his daughter, Magdalena, he was the grandfather of Hester Gansevoort Ten Eyck (1796–1861), Abraham Gansevoort Ten Eyck (1798–1830), Leonard Gansevoort Ten Eyck (1801–1881), Jacob L. Ten Eyck (1804–1875), and Herman Gansevoort Ten Eyck (1806–1881), and Peter Gansevoort Ten Eyck (1810–1891).

Through his daughter, Catharine, he was the grandfather of Elizabeth Ann Van Vechten (1812–1812), Leonard Gansevoort Van Vechten (1813–1837), Hester Elizabeth Van Vechten Trotter (1815–1881), Teunis Van Vechten (1819–1859), Cuyler Van Vechten (1823–1825), and Cuyler Van Vechten (1830–1875).

He was also the granduncle of Moby Dick author Herman Melville.
