= Killian K. Van Rensselaer =

American politician (1763–1845)

Killian Killian Van Rensselaer
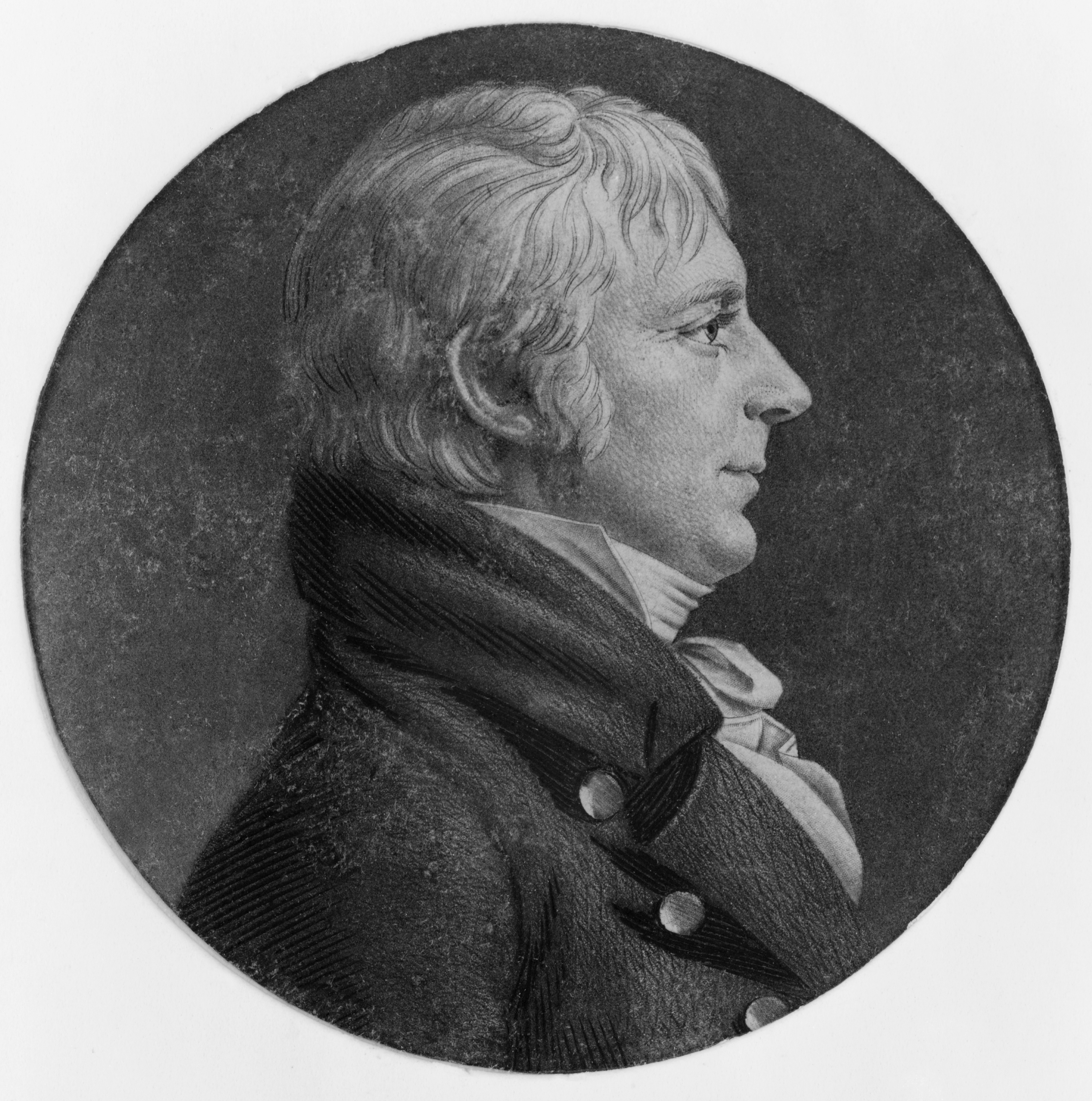

Member of the U.S. House of Representatives from New York
- In office March 4, 1801 – March 4, 1811
- Preceded by: Henry Glen
- Succeeded by: Harmanus Bleecker
- Constituency: 8th district (1801–1803); 9th district (1803–1809); 7th district (1809–1811)

Personal details
- Born: Killian Killian Van Rensselaer; June 9, 1763 Greenbush, Province of New York, British America
- Died: June 18, 1845 (aged 82) Albany, New York, U.S.
- Party: Federalist
- Spouse: Margaret Sanders (m. 1791; died 1830)
- Children: 5
- Parent(s): Kiliaen Van Rensselaer; Ariantje Schuyler
- Relatives: Henry K. Van Rensselaer (brother); Philip K. Van Rensselaer (brother); Hendrick Van Rensselaer (grandfather)
- Education: Yale College
- Profession: Lawyer, politician

Killian Killian Van Rensselaer (June 9, 1763 – June 18, 1845) was an American lawyer and Federalist politician who served in the United States Congress as a Representative from the state of New York.

== Early life ==
Killian Killian Van Rensselaer was born on June 9, 1763, at the old family mansion owned by his uncle Johannes in Greenbush in the Province of New York to Kiliaen Van Rensselaer (1717–1781) and his first wife, Ariantje "Harriet" Schuyler (1720–1763), who died four months after his birth. Killian was therefore the youngest of nine children born to his parents, including older brothers Henry Kiliaen Van Rensselaer (1744–1816) and Philip Kiliaen van Rensselaer (1747–1798), and Nicholas Van Rensselaer (1754–1848). His elder sister, Catharine Van Rensselaer, married William Henry Ludlow (1740–1803). His father was commissioned as a Colonel of the 4th Regiment, Albany County Militia on October 20, 1775, and was wounded during the Battles of Saratoga and received the highest compliments about his courage from General George Washington.

Killian K. completed preparatory studies and attended Yale College, where he studied law.

== Career ==
He was admitted to the bar in 1784, and commenced practice in Claverack, New York. He owned slaves. He was private secretary to General Philip Schuyler (1733–1804), a general in the American Revolutionary War and later a United States senator, and also a cousin through his mother.

In 1794, he corresponded with James Madison regarding a letter of introduction for Robert S. Van Rensselaer, the son of his brother Philip, on his trip to Europe, at which time he met with members of the extended Van Rensselaer family in Holland.

=== United States Congress ===
Van Rensselaer was elected as a Federalist to the Seventh United States Congress, taking his seat on March 4, 1801, during the first Congress that met in Washington, D.C., as the previous congresses had met in New York and Philadelphia. The start of seventh Congress immediately followed the election of Thomas Jefferson over Aaron Burr by the preceding United States House of Representatives. Van Rensselaer went on to serve in the Eighth, Ninth, Tenth, and Eleventh United States Congresses, serving until March 3, 1811.

While in Congress, he was placed on the Ways and Means Committee. He was invited and dined at the White House with President Jefferson and President Madison, as well as at The Octagon House, the residences of Col. John Tayloe - a close friend of George Washington. He was associated with Count Fyodor Palen, the Plenipotentiary of the Czar of Russia to the United States, and Louis Marie Turreau, Napoleon's Ambassador to the United States.

Afterwards, he returned to Claverack and resumed the practice of law.

== Personal life ==
On January 27, 1791, Van Rensselaer married Margaretta "Margaret" Sanders (1764–1830), daughter of John Sanders (d. 1782) and Deborah Glen (d. 1786) of Scotia, and a cousin of his brother Philip's wife. Her sister, Maria, was the wife of Mayor Johannes Jacobse Beekman. Together they had five children, one of whom died in infancy:

- John Sanders Van Rensselaer (1792–1868), who married Ann Dunkin (1795–1845)
- William Van Rensselaer (1794–1855)
- Deborah Van Rensselaer (1795–1796), who died in infancy
- Richard Van Rensselaer (1797–1880), who married Elizabeth Van Rensselaer (d. 1835), and later Matilda Fonda Van Rensselaer (d. 1863)
- Bernard Sanders Van Rensselaer (1801–1879), who married Elizabeth Hum (d. 1834), and later Mary Targee (d. 1858).

They lived at 112 State Street, a home built for them in 1801, at the same time Philip S. Van Rensselaer, the Mayor, built his home on the corner of Chapel Street (which was later purchased by Erastus Corning). Van Rensselaer died on June 18, 1845, in Albany, New York, aged 82, and was interred in a private cemetery at East Greenbush.

=== Descendants ===
Killian's grandson was Charles van Rensselaer (1823–1857), the first officer on the SS Central America, when it was lost during a hurricane in September 1857.

U.S. House of Representatives
Preceded by Henry Glen	Member of the U.S. House of Representatives from New York's 8th congressional district 1801–1803	Succeeded by Henry W. Livingston
Preceded by Benjamin Walker	Member of the U.S. House of Representatives from New York's 9th congressional district 1803–1809	Succeeded by Thomas Sammons
Preceded by Barent Gardenier	Member of the U.S. House of Representatives from New York's 7th congressional district 1809–1811	Succeeded by Harmanus Bleecker
