= Edward Hunter =

Edward Hunter may refer to:

- Edward Hunter (Billy Banjo) (1885–1959), also known as Billy Banjo, Scottish-born socialist
- Edward Hunter (Mormon) (1793–1883), third Presiding Bishop of The Church of Jesus Christ of Latter-day Saints
- Edward Hunter (United States Army) (1839–1928), American army officer
- Edward Hunter (journalist) (1902–1978), American journalist and intelligence agent
- Dr. Edward Hunter, namesake of the Hunter's bend knot
- Edward M. Hunter (1826–1878), American politician and lawyer

== Other ==
- Eddie Hunter (EastEnders), EastEnders character
- Ed Hunter, a 1999 first-person shooter video game
- Ed Hunter (director), a pornographic film director and producer

== See also ==
- Sir Edward Hunter-Blair, 8th Baronet (1920–2006), British nobleman
- Ted Hunter, a fictional character in Air Hostess (1933 film)
