= Crailo =

Crailo can refer to:

- Fort Crailo, a fort in Rensselaer, New York
- Crailo, Huizen, a village in the Netherlands in the municipality of Huizen
