= Kiliaen van Rensselaer (colonel) =

American soldier and politician (1717–1781)

- Born: December 27, 1717; East Greenbush, Province of New York, British America
- Died: December 28, 1781 (aged 64); Albany, New York, US
- Spouses: Harriet Schuyler (m. 1742; died 1763) Maria Low (m. 1769)
- Parent(s): Hendrick van Rensselaer; Catharina Van Brugh
- Relatives: Johannes Pieterse Van Brugh (grandfather); Solomon Van Rensselaer (grandson)

Colonel Kiliaen van Rensselaer (December 27, 1717 – December 28, 1781) was a colonial American soldier and politician who was a member of the prominent Van Rensselaer family.

== Early life ==
Kiliaen was born on December 27, 1717, around Albany in the Province of New York. He was the youngest of eleven children born to Hendrick van Rensselaer of Fort Crailo by Catharina (née Van Brugh) Van Rensselaer. Among his older siblings were Johannes Van Rensselaer. His father was director of the Eastern patent of the Manor of Rensselaerswyck which covered roughly 62,000 acres of land in what is now Columbia County.

His paternal grandparents were Maria van Cortlandt van Rensselaer (sister of New York City mayors Stephanus and Jacobus Van Cortlandt) and Jeremias van Rensselaer, the acting Patroon of Rensselaerswyck from 1658 to 1674 (who was a son of Kiliaen van Rensselaer, one of the founders and directors of the Dutch West India Company). Among his nephews were Brig. Gen. Robert Van Rensselaer. In describing the Van Rensselaer family, historian author William L. Stone stated: "They consisted of eighteen males in 1776. During the war every adult, except two old men, and all minors, except four boys, bore arms in one or more battles during the Revolutionary struggle." George W. Schuyler later wrote in his Colonial New York, "... of the eighteen males, sixteen belonged to Hendrick Van Rensselaer's branch, and of these, five were of Kiliaen Van Rensselaer's family." His maternal grandparents were the former Catharine Roeloffe Jans and merchant Johannes Pieterse Van Brugh. His uncle, Pieter Van Brugh, served as the mayor of Albany from 1699 to 1700 and from 1721 to 1723.

== Career ==
Van Rensselaer was a gentleman farmer and landlord. Through inheritances and marriages, he received additional landholdings on the east side of the Hudson River.

=== American Revolution ===
He was commissioned as a colonel in his brother's 4th Regiment, Albany County Militia, Rensselaerswyck battalion on October 20, 1775, during the American Revolution. He was the representative for Rensselaerswyck on the Committee of Correspondence as hostilities broke out in 1775. Van Rensselaer was seriously wounded by a shot in the hip during the Battles of Saratoga that forced him to discontinue further service. General George Washington paid the highest of compliments about his courage.

== Personal life ==
On January 1, 1742, he was married to Ariantje "Harriet" Schuyler (1720–1763), a daughter of Nicolas Schuyler and Elsie (née Wendell) Schuyler and granddaughter of Philip Pieterse Schuyler (grandfather of General and U.S. Senator Philip Schuyler and Mayor Abraham Cuyler). Her uncle was Albany mayor Johannes Schuyler and her first cousin was Johannes Schuyler Jr. Together, they lived on the east side of Rensselaerswyck, overlooking Papsknee Island, and were the parents of nine children, including:

- Hendrick Kiliaen Van Rensselaer (1744–1816), a general in the Revolution who married Alida Bradt, a daughter Hendrick Bradt and Rebecca Van Vechten.
- Philip Kiliaen van Rensselaer (1747–1798), a colonel in the Revolution who married Maria Sanders (1749–1830), daughter of Robert Sanders and granddaughter of Pieter Schuyler, in 1768.
- Nicholas Van Rensselaer (1754-1848), a Colonel and aide-de-camp under General Philip Schuyler, who married Elsie Van Buren (1759–1844), a daughter of Cornelis Van Buren, in 1780.
- Catharine Van Rensselaer (d. 1778), who married William Henry Ludlow in 1771.
- Elsie Van Rensselaer (1758–1796), who married Abraham Lansing (1752–1822) in 1774.
- Maria Van Rensselaer (1760–1841), who married Leonard Gansevoort Jr. (1754–1834) (a first cousin of New York State Senator Leonard Gansevoort) in 1777.
- Killian K. Van Rensselaer (1763–1845), U.S. Representative who married Margaret Sanders (1764–1830), a daughter of John Sanders and cousin to Philip's wife, in 1791.

His wife died October 17, 1763, four months after the birth of their last child. On September 18, 1769, he remarried to Maria Low of John Low of Newark, New Jersey. Her father died in 1774 and Van Rensselaer was one of the executors of his estate.

Van Rensselaer died on December 28, 1781.
