= Cherry Hill (Albany, New York) =

Historic house in New York, United States

- U.S. National Register of Historic Places
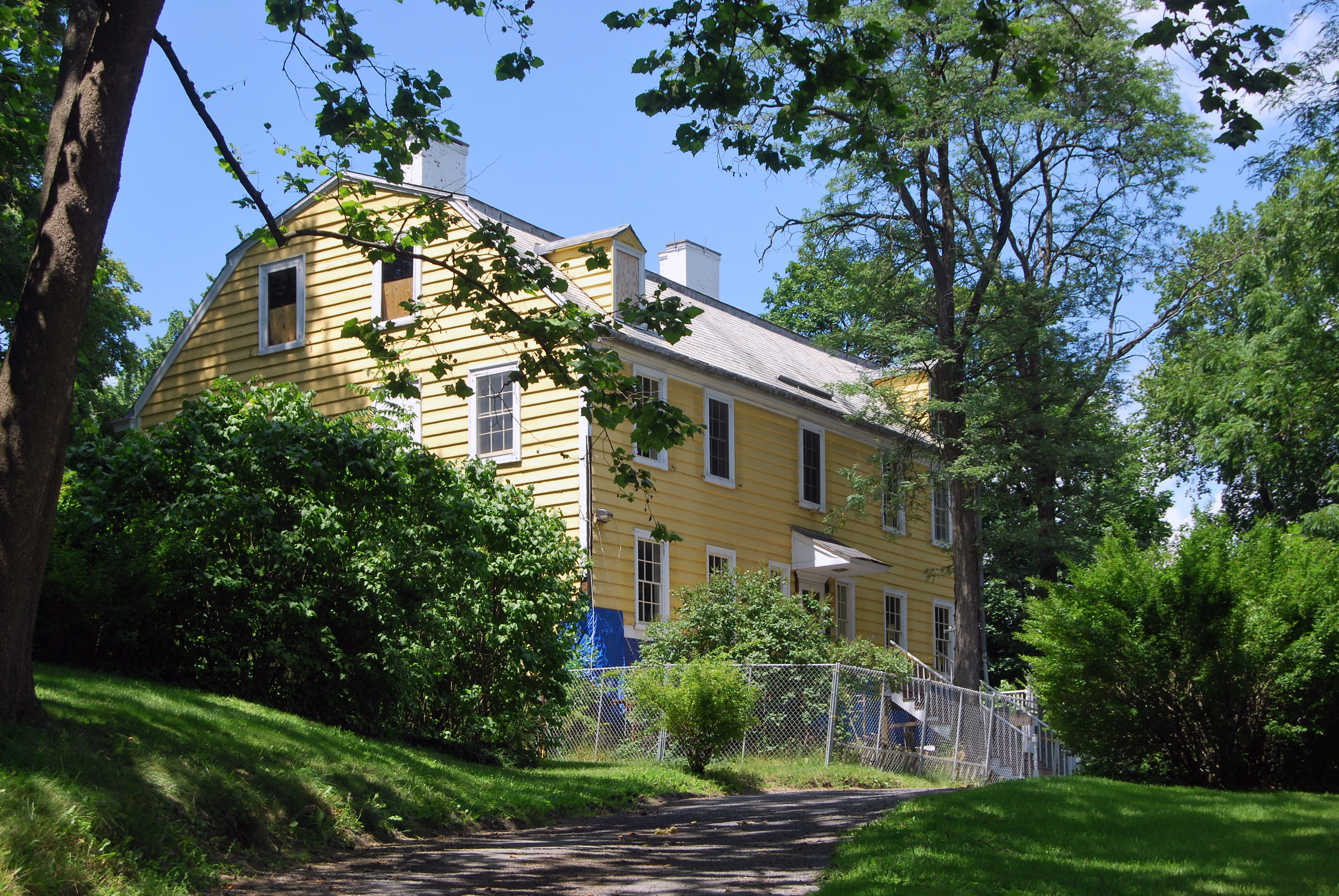
- South profile and east elevation, 2011

- Location within New York Location within the United States
- Location: Albany, NY
- Coordinates: 42°38′5″N 73°45′50″W
- Area: 1 acre (4,000 m^{2})
- Built: 1787
- Architect: Isaac Packard (builder)
- Architectural style: Dutch Colonial
- NRHP reference No.: 71000517
- Added to NRHP: February 18, 1971

Cherry Hill is a historic house located on South Pearl Street (New York State Route 32) in Albany, New York. It was built in 1787. In 1971, Cherry Hill was listed on the National Register of Historic Places.

Cherry Hill was built by Colonel Philip Kiliaen van Rensselaer for his bride Maria Sanders, who was the granddaughter of Peter Schuyler. During the early 19th century, it was the home of Solomon van Rensselaer, who served in Congress and several local governmental positions. It eventually became the manor house of a large farm. For several years during the 1820s, the Marquis de Lafayette resided in Cherry Hill during his return visit to the U.S. Cherry Hill was also the site of a murder which led to the last public hanging in Albany following a controversial trial.

Van Rensselaer's descendants lived at Cherry Hill for nearly two centuries, preserving intact not only the building's original interior finishes but also its furniture, portraits, kitchenware and family documents. Since the van Rensselaers' tenure, Cherry Hill has been operated as a historic house museum by the Historic Cherry Hill Association. The house has undergone an extensive restoration because it was in danger of collapsing under the weight of its stored collections.

== Building and grounds ==
The house is located in southern Albany, on the west side of South Pearl between McCarty and First avenues, just north and west of Interstate 787. It sits on a slight rise giving it a view of the Hudson River and the facilities of the Port of Albany–Rensselaer a half-mile (800 m) east. Second Avenue, the south boundary of the South End–Groesbeckville Historic District, is a block to the north.

Along both McCarty and First are detached two- and three-story 19th-century rowhouses. A more modern structure is located along Cherry Hill Street at the opposite corner of the block. Otherwise the land is undeveloped and wooded. The next block north has small, industrial buildings; larger facilities such as tank farms are located across I-787 and the railroad tracks east of the highway.

A driveway leads up to the house from South Pearl, a short distance south of the onramp to I-787 across the street. It leads uphill to the house, a two-and-a-half-story, five-by-four-bay rectangular frame dwelling on a stone foundation with clapboard siding. On the north there is a two-story projecting section with a flat roof. The main entrance, at the center of the east (front) facade, has a shed-roofed hood. It has a full-width wooden porch with turned balusters and long wooden steps; another porch is in the corner between the main block and the north projection.

Fenestration consists of six-over-six double-hung sash windows with plain wide wooden surrounds. The main entrance is flanked by additional six-over-six double-hung sash as sidelights. At the attic level on the east and west faces are two additional windows.

A small molded cornice marks the roofline. Above it is a gambrel roof shingled in asphalt. It is pierced on either side near the ends by two gabled dormer windows. At the crest are two brick chimneys with corbeled caps.

== History ==
In 1768, at the age of 21, Philip Kiliaen van Rensselaer married Maria Sanders, the daughter of another prominent Albany family. At the time the city was still small, largely limited to the area of the current downtown, from which the stockade had only recently been removed. From the family home on South Pearl Street, he continued the family's mercantile business, selling imports from the West Indies and buying local forest and farm products to ship down the Hudson via the sloops that carried much of the era's trade in the region.

During this time, van Rensselaer began building a farmstead on family land located south of what was, at the time, the city limits. In the Revolutionary War he served on the local Committee of Correspondence, and later serving as a civilian liaison on the supply chain. By the end of the war Phillip Schuyler, who had his own large farm and house south of the city, trusted him to command ten men and oversee the storage of ordnance.

In 1787, with the war behind him and independence achieved, van Rensselaer hired local carpenter Isaac Packard to replace the older, existing house on the farm, which he now called Cherry Hill, with the current structure. The house combined a Georgian body with a gambrel roof, commonly found on the Dutch Colonial houses van Rensselaer's ancestors (and indeed many of Albany's earlier settlers) had built. The family and its many children moved in later that year.

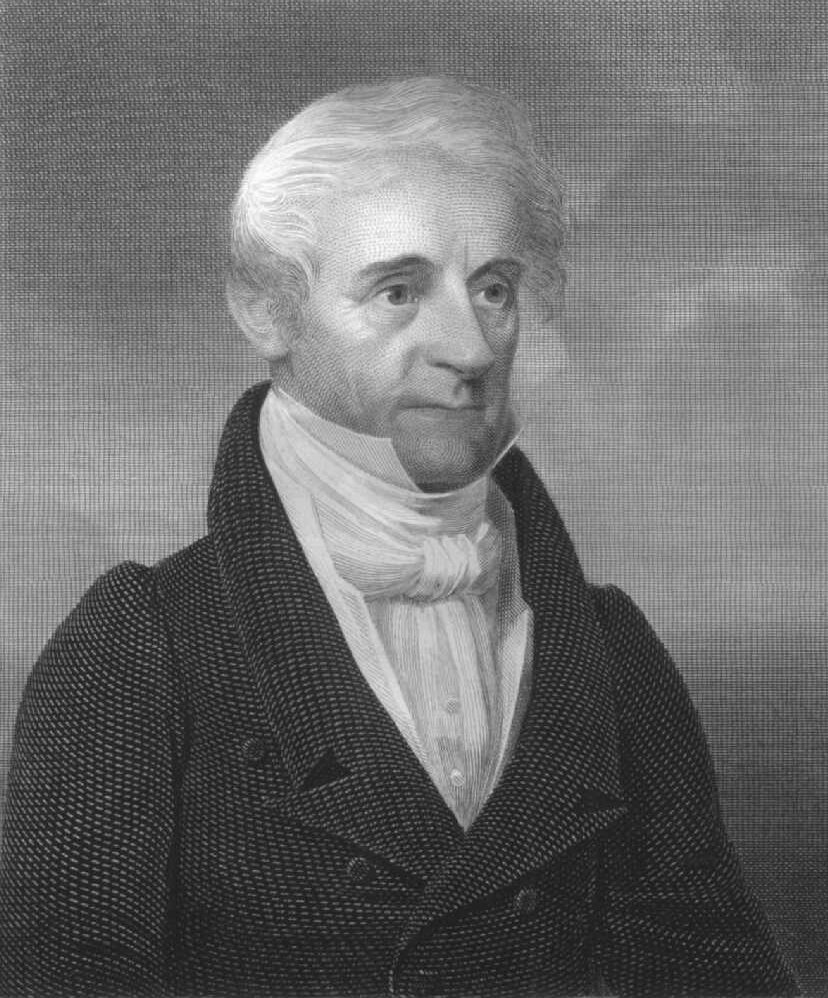
Solomon van Rensselaer

Van Rensselaer kept building up the farm, and by 1790 it was almost a thousand acres (400 ha). That year's census reports that he had established a tannery and brewery on the property. In 1794 he was elected the first supervisor of the newly created Town of Bethlehem. Four years later he died three months after filing his will. It provided generously for his family, and his wife and children continued to live at Cherry Hill until her death in 1824. One of his sons, Solomon Van Rensselaer, followed his father into public service. In addition to service in the U.S. House of Representatives, he was also Albany's postmaster and the state's adjutant general. In 1824 he hosted the Marquis de Lafayette at Cherry Hill on the Revolutionary War hero's return tour of the United States.

Three years later, the house would be the scene of a more ignominious event, the Cherry Hill murder. Among the 17 people living there in 1827 was John Whipple, a prosperous businessman who had married into the van Rensselaer family. His wife, Elsie Lansing, became romantically involved with Jesse Strang, a drifter who had left his own wife and children in Putnam County and was living under an assumed name as one of the servants in the house. They plotted together to murder Whipple. Stang was caught and confessed in full, believing that Albany's establishment would balk at hanging Elsie and thus spare him the same fate. However, while he was convicted and sentenced to death, she was acquitted. His execution was the last public hanging in the city's history. The affair drew national attention, and many thought Strang a victim of socioeconomic inequities of the time.

That class hegemony, which the van Rensselaers had stood atop since Dutch colonial times, was already under threat at that point. With most of the family lands, its original source of wealth, being subdivided and sold, and the semi-feudal patroonship system of land ownership under legal threat, without anything to replace it the family fortune was already in trouble. Over the next several decades the rise of industrialization brought on by the Erie Canal and the development of the railroads fed vast fortunes which dwarfed the van Rensselaers', and brought immigrants to the city, diluting their political power and fueling its steady growth. Development began to encroach southward onto the family's ancestral lands. By 1872 the area around Cherry Hill could no longer be considered rural, and that year Albany formally annexed it into the city. The two dormers were added to the roof sometime between 1850 and 1880.

Through the late 19th and early 20th century Cherry Hill was the property of Catherine Putman Rankin, a cousin of the van Rensselaers. Industry, and worker housing, was within a short distance of the house. Rankin, and later her daughter Emily, devoted their time to preserving what was left.

In 1963, Emily Rankin died. She specified in her will that the house was to become a museum. Five years later, Cherry Hill did become a museum. In 1971 it was among the first group of properties listed on the National Register of Historic Places in the city after the Schuyler Mansion. Its collection includes 20,000 objects, including all of the house's original furnishings, tableware—and 30,000 historic documents from the van Rensselaer family archives. Some of the items, such as original 18th-century rugs, have been loaned to other museums like the Metropolitan Museum of Art. By the 21st century, that collection--mostly stored in the attic--was putting such a strain on the house's structural system that it had to be moved before the building collapsed from the weight. In 2009, Cherry Hill closed to visitors and began a four-phase, $3.2 million restoration funded by various public and private grants.

== See also ==
- National Register of Historic Places listings in Albany, New York
