= Robert Sanders (mayor) =

Mayor of Albany, New York

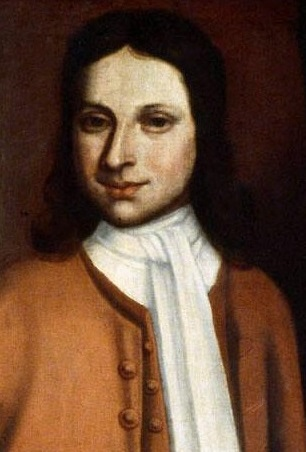
- Sanders, circa 1724. Closeup of full length portrait.

Mayor of Albany, New York
- In office 1750–1754
- Preceded by: Jacob Coenraedt Ten Eyck
- Succeeded by: Johannes Hansen

Personal details
- Born: July 11, 1705 Albany, New York, British America
- Died: May 24, 1765 (aged 59) Albany, New York, British North America
- Resting place: Sanders Cemetery, Scotia, New York, U.S.
- Spouse(s): Maria Lansing (m. 1740); Elizabeth Schuyler (m. 1747)
- Children: 10
- Relatives: Philip Kiliaen van Rensselaer (son-in-law)
- Occupation: Fur trader Merchant

Robert Sanders (July 11, 1705 – May 24, 1765) was a British America businessman and government official. He served as Mayor of Albany, New York from 1750 to 1754.

== Early life ==
Robert Sanders was born in Albany, New York, then part of British America, on July 11, 1705. Sanders was the eldest son of Albany merchant and fur trader Barent Sanders and Maria (Wendell) Sanders. He was raised and educated in Albany, then joined his father's mercantile and fur business. During the early-to-mid 1700s, Barent Sanders and then Robert Sanders ranged into what are now Western New York and Canada, where they established connections with American Indians that enabled the Sanders family's fur business to grow and prosper. Trade between the British colonies and the French in Canada was illegal, but many British colonists who lived in upstate New York profited from business dealings with the French, including the Sanders family.

In 1740, Robert Sanders married Maria Lansing, the daughter of an Albany merchant and member of the prominent Lansing family. At 35, Sanders was 12 years older than his wife. Their marriage ended in 1743, when Maria died following the birth of their first child. In 1747, he married 22 year old Elizabeth Schuyler, a member of Albany's prominent Schuyler family. Sanders and Schuyler had nine children between 1747 and 1761; they were pewholders at the First Church in Albany, where their children were baptized.

== Continued career ==
As the heir to his father's estate and a prominent businessman in his own right, Sanders took part in Albany's governance, including terms as constable and fire master of the city's second ward. In 1748, he was appointed Albany's recorder, in effect the deputy mayor. In 1749, he was named judge of the county court of common pleas.

In 1750, Governor George Clinton appointed Sanders to succeed Jacob Coenraedt Ten Eyck as mayor. During his administration, the city hosted the Albany Congress, at which the British colonies planned coordinated actions in advance of the French and Indian War. In 1754, he was succeeded as mayor by Johannes Hansen.

== Later life ==
Following his term as mayor, Sanders resumed active management of the Sanders family businesses and estate, and resided in a home on Albany's Pearl Street. His wife died in 1763, and Sanders died in Albany on May 24, 1765. He was buried beneath the floor of the First Reformed Church; in 1805, Sanders family members disinterred the remains of ancestors from the church, including Robert Sanders, and reinterred them at the Sanders Family Cemetery in Scotia, New York.

After Sanders died, management of his business interests fell to his son-in-law Philip Kiliaen van Rensselaer, the husband of his daughter Maria. Sanders's granddaughter Ariaantje, known as Harriet, was the wife of Solomon Van Rensselaer.
