= Alexander Henry Hoff =

American physician

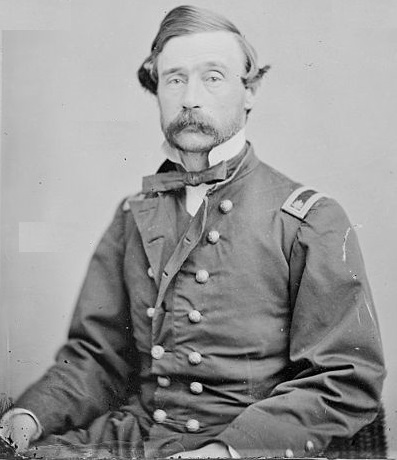
- Major Alexander H. Hoff
- Born: December 18, 1822; Philadelphia, Pennsylvania, US
- Died: August 19, 1876 (aged 53); Philadelphia, Pennsylvania, US
- Burial place: Arlington National Cemetery
- Spouse: Ann Eliza van Rensselaer Hoff
- Relatives: Col. John van R. Hoff (son); Col. Edward Hunter (son-in-law)
- Military career
- Allegiance: United States; Union
- Branch: United States Army; Union Army
- Service years: 1861–1876
- Rank: Captain, USA; Major, USV; Bvt. Colonel, USV
- Unit: 3rd New York Infantry Regiment
- Commands: Brigade Surgeon; Superintendent of Medical Transportation, Mississippi River; Medical Director of Transportation, East Coast; Medical Director, Department of Alaska
- Conflicts: American Civil War: Battle of Big Bethel
- Other work: medical doctor, surgeon

Alexander Henry Hoff (December 18, 1822 – August 19, 1876) was an American medical doctors and military surgeon during the American Civil War. He planned the medical details of the first American purpose-built hospital ship and was the first army surgeon in Alaska.

== Early life and family ==
Alexander Hoff was born in Philadelphia, Pennsylvania, on December 18, 1822; as son of Caroline Clay Hoff and Rev. Brogan Hoff. He received his medical degree in 1843 from the local Jefferson Medical College and, despite leaning towards a career as army physician, joined the Blockley Hospital. He moved to New York State as a private physician during the late 1840s or early 1850s. He also became an examining surgeon at the recruiting station at Albany and served as Surgeon-General of New York from 1852 to 1854.

Hoff married Ann Eliza van Rensselaer, a daughter of John Sanders Van Rensselaer and member of a prominent political family, shortly after his move. Their son, John van Rensselaer Hoff, was born in 1848. John became a military surgeon, too. He founded the Army Hospital Corps in 1898, served as Deputy Surgeon General, returned for service during World War I and was posthumously awarded the Distinguished Service Cross for service at Wounded Knee. Two years after the birth of John, in 1850, their daughter Caroline Clay Hoff was born. In 1870 she married Lieutenant, later Colonel, Edward Hunter while both were in California. Henry and Ann had another daughter, Harriet L. Hoff, who died in 1915.

== Civil War service ==
When the American Civil War erupted in 1861, Hoff volunteered for the U.S. Army and was assigned as surgeon, with the rank of major, to the 3rd New York Infantry Regiment. He participated in the Battle of Big Bethel, where a lamp was shot out of his hands, and others in the Eastern Theater. He became brigade surgeon on August 3, 1861, and was transferred to the command of Maj. Gen. John C. Fremont in Missouri.

In the west he was made superintendent of medical transportation on the Mississippi River under Gen. U.S. Grant. During his time he modified and supervised the D.A. January, the first hospital ship owned and operated by the government instead of the U.S. Sanitary Commission or another chartered ship. He also was responsible for widely banning mercury from the operating tables. In 1864 he went to New York City as he was elevated to medical director of transportation for the East Coast. There he planned the medical details for the new ocean steamer J.K. Barnes, the first American purpose-built hospital ship. When the war ended Hoff received the brevets of lieutenant colonel and colonel of volunteers for faithful and meritorious services during the war and was mustered out during summer 1865.

== Later life ==
Hoff, wanting to remain in the regular army, took an examination before the army medical board and scored fourth. He received a commission as an assistant surgeon, ranking captain, in 1867. When Alaska was added to the United States as the Department of Alaska, under the jurisdiction of the army, Hoff was assigned as medical director. Later he served in California and New York before joining the Army Medical Examination Board in Philadelphia 1874. Hoff died there on August 19, 1876, and is buried on the Arlington National Cemetery.

== Sources ==
- Hoff, Col. John van R. (May 31, 1912). Memoir of Alexander Henry Hoff (read in his speech at the Army Medical School).
