= David Van Horne =

American merchant and military officer (1755–1801)

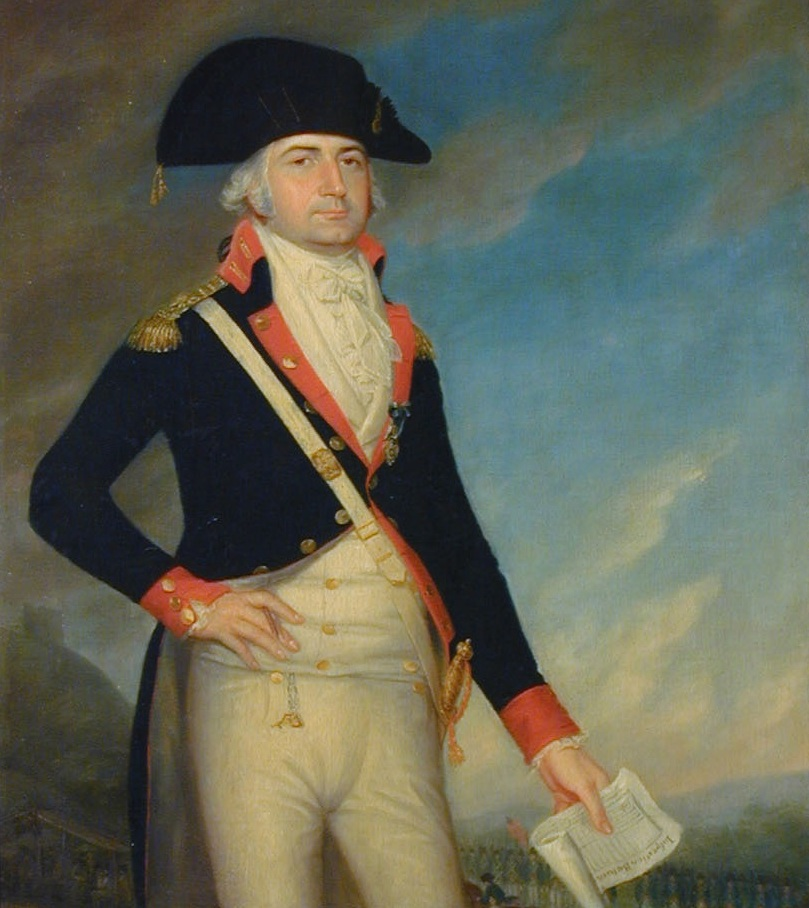
- Portrait by William Dunlap, 1790
- Born: 1755; New York City, New York, US
- Died: 1801 (aged 45–46); New York City, New York, US
- Spouse: Sarah C. Miller (m. 1788–1801)
- Children: 1
- Military career
- Allegiance: United Colonies; United States
- Branch: Continental Army; New York Militia
- Service years: 1775–1801
- Rank: Brigadier general
- Units: 1st New York Regiment; 4th Massachusetts Regiment
- Commands: Adjutant General of New York
- Wars: American Revolutionary War
- Other work: Merchant

Brigadier General David Van Horne (1755 – 12 May 1801) was an American merchant and military officer from New York City. A veteran of the American Revolutionary War, after the war he attained the rank of brigadier general as Adjutant General of New York.

== Biography ==
David Van Horne was born in New York City in 1755, the son of David Van Horne (1715–1775) and Anna (French) Van Horne (1722–1786). (Note: Some sources indicate that Van Horne was born in 1746, but announcements of his 1801 death indicated he was in his 46th year, which would make his birth year 1755.) He was raised and educated in New York City and trained for a mercantile career.

During the American Revolutionary War, Van Horne joined the military and in June 1775 was commissioned as a first lieutenant in the 1st New York Regiment, which was commanded by Alexander McDougall. He was subsequently commissioned as a captain in the 4th Massachusetts Regiment, which was commanded by Henry Jackson. His wartime service included remaining with the army during the 1777–1778 winter at Valley Forge.

After the war, Van Horne continued to serve in the military as a member of the New York Militia. He was promoted to major in 1786. In 1789, he received promotion to lieutenant colonel. Van Horne was selected to serve as Adjutant General of New York with the rank of brigadier general in 1793, succeeding Nicholas Fish. He served in this position until becoming ill in January 1801 and was succeeded by Solomon Van Rensselaer. In 1795, he was elected a trustee of the New York Society Library. He was an original member of the Society of the Cincinnati; when the society conducted ceremonies in Albany, New York in January 1800 to commemorate the December 1799 death of George Washington, the pallbearers included Van Horne, Philip Schuyler, Peter Gansevoort, John C. Ten Broeck, John H. Wendell, and Stephen Lush.

Van Horne died in New York City on 12 May 1801. His pallbearers included George Clinton, Alexander Hamilton, and several other members of the Society of the Cincinnati. Attendees at his funeral included Aaron Burr, Robert R. Livingston, Richard Varick, and several units of the state militia.
