= Solomon Van Rensselaer =

American politician (1774–1852)

Solomon van Vechten van Rensselaer
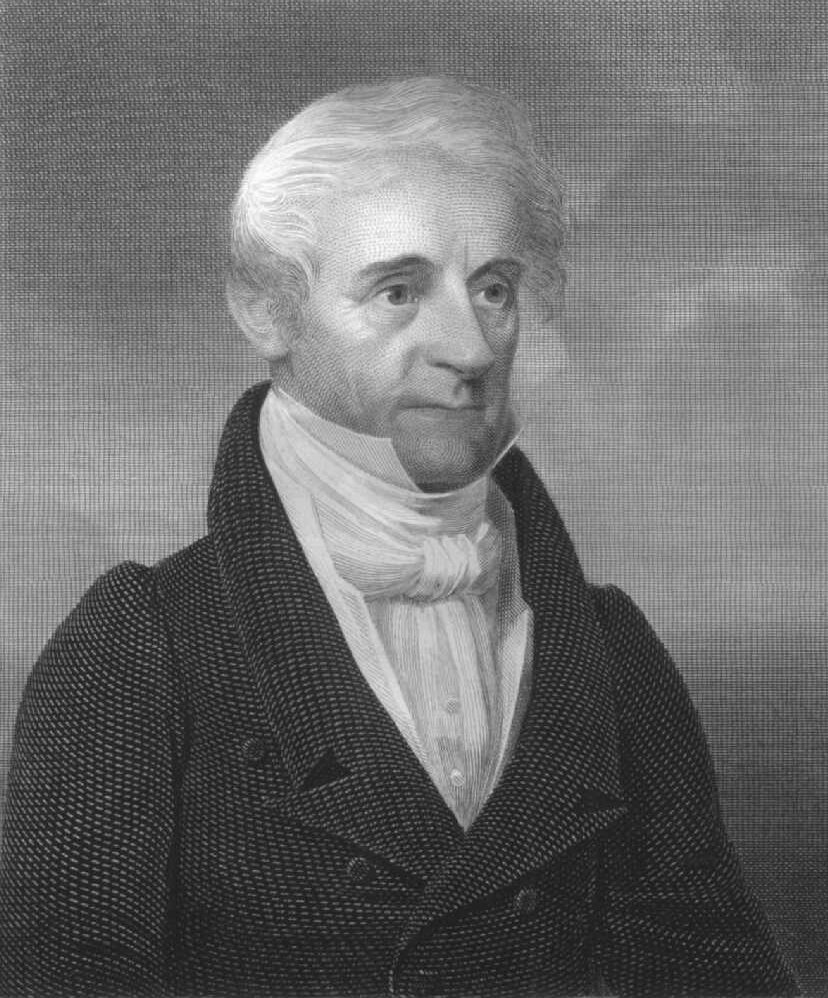

Postmaster of Albany, New York
- In office 1822–1839
- Preceded by: Solomon Southwick
- Succeeded by: Azariah C. Flagg

Member of the U.S. House of Representatives from New York's 9th district
- In office March 4, 1819 – January 14, 1822
- Preceded by: Rensselaer Westerlo
- Succeeded by: Stephen Van Rensselaer

Personal details
- Born: August 9, 1774 Greenbush, Province of New York, British America
- Died: April 23, 1852 (aged 77) near Albany, New York, U.S.
- Spouse: Harriet Van Rensselaer
- Parent(s): Hendrick Van Rensselaer; Alida Bratt
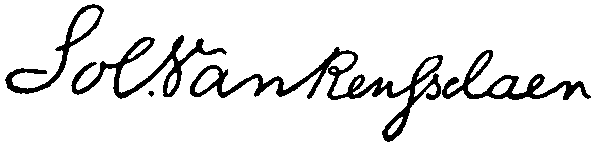
- Signature

Solomon van Vechten van Rensselaer (August 9, 1774 – April 23, 1852) was a United States representative from the state of New York, a lieutenant colonel during the War of 1812, and postmaster of Albany for 17 years.

== Early life ==
Solomon van Rensselaer was born on August 9, 1774, in Greenbush in the Province of New York, the son of Hendrick Kiliaen "Henry" Van Rensselaer (1744–1816) and Alida Bratt. He completed preparatory studies in East Greenbush.

== Career ==
He appointed as a cornet in the United States Army in 1792, was promoted to captain in July 1793, and then to major in January 1799, before being honorably discharged in June 1800. He succeeded David Van Horne as Adjutant General of New York in 1801 and served until 1809. He served again from 1810 to 1811 and 1813 to 1821. He served in the War of 1812 as a lieutenant colonel of New York State Militia.

He was elected as a Federalist to the Sixteenth and Seventeenth United States Congresses, and served from March 4, 1819, to January 14, 1822, when he resigned. He was postmaster of Albany, New York from 1822 to 1839, and from 1841 to 1843 and a delegate from New York at the opening of the Erie Canal on November 4, 1825. Though he was opposed to the extension of slavery into newly-acquired territories, Van Rensselaer owned slaves until New York's gradual emancipation law ended the practice in 1827.

== Personal life ==
In January 1797, he married his cousin, Harriet "Arriet" Van Rensselaer (1775–1840), the daughter of Philip Kiliaen van Rensselaer (1747–1798), granddaughter of Robert Sanders, and the owner of the Cherry Hill mansion. Of their many children, only five daughters and one son survived to maturity:

- Adaline "Alida" Van Rensselaer (1797–1858)
- Elizabeth Van Rensselaer (1799–1835), who married Richard Van Rensselaer (1797–1880)
- Rensselaer Van Rensselaer (1802–1850), who married Mary Euphemia Forman in 1840.
- Van Vechten Van Rensselaer (1806–1812), who died aged 6.
- Rufus King Van Rensselaer (1809–1809), who died aged 3 months.
- Margarita Van Rensselaer (1810–1880)
- Stephen Van Rensselaer (1812–1813), who died aged 10 months.
- Harriet Maria Van Rensselaer (1816–1896), who married Dr. Peter Elmendorf (1815–1881)
- Catharine Visscher Van Rensselaer (1817–1891), who married Rev. Samuel W. Bonney (1815–1864) in 1856.

Van Rensselaer died near Albany, aged 77. He was interred in the North Dutch Church Cemetery, in Albany, and reinterred in Albany Rural Cemetery. His home at Albany, Cherry Hill, was listed on the National Register of Historic Places in 1971. As his sons had all predeceased Solomon, his daughter, Harriet Maria Elmendorf inherited Cherry Hill.

U.S. House of Representatives
Preceded by Rensselaer Westerlo	Member of the U.S. House of Representatives from New York's 9th congressional district 1819–1822	Succeeded by Stephen Van Rensselaer
