= Murder at Cherry Hill =

1827 murder in New York, United States

The Murder at Cherry Hill occurred in 1827 near Albany, New York, when John Whipple was shot and killed at the Cherry Hill farm, home of a prominent Albany family, the Van Rensselaers. John's wife, Elsie, and her lover, Jesse Strang, were tried for the murder. While Elsie was acquitted as an accomplice, Strang was found guilty and sentenced to death for the crime; his execution was the last public hanging in Albany.

Known at the time as the Strang-Whipple case, the murder and subsequent trial revealed much about the society of the time. It touched upon important issues of the day such as women's roles and legal rights, social class, punishment and the law, and slavery in New York.

== Background ==
Jesse Strang, of Putnam County, New York, deserted his wife and children in the belief that his wife was unfaithful. He became a drifter and went to Ohio but shortly after returned to New York in 1826. The scandalous nature of his separation might have stopped then if there had not been a baggage problem that caused him to seek a job in Albany.

Strang met Elsie Whipple in a bar in Albany. Elsie was the daughter of Abraham Lansing and Elsie Van Rensselaer and wife of John Whipple. Strang fell in love with Elsie and took a job as a handyman under the name of Joseph Orton in Cherry Hill, the Van Rensselaers' residence. Elsie in turn fell in love with him. Elsie tended to be grumpy, irksome, and prone to hysterics and violent shouting fits. She felt dominated and controlled by her husband. The lovers kept in touch with the help of members of the household who passed letters between them.

== Murder ==
Elsie decided that the best thing for them to do was to kill John and run away. Elsie conspired with a reluctant Jesse to poison John's tea with arsenic so they could elope, but their attempt failed.

John Whipple became suspicious and kept a loaded gun. In May 1827, Elsie stole the bullet and gave it to Strang, and once more insisted that Strang kill her husband. Strang climbed onto the roof of the shed one night and used his $15 rifle to shoot and kill Whipple. Strang then immediately ran towards a local store to secure an alibi for the police. He then returned to Cherry Hill and helped a doctor remove the bullet from Whipple's body.

Later, however, the police ruled that he could have traveled the mile from Cherry Hill to the store and detained Whipple on suspicion of the murder. Upon capture, a fearful Strang, hoping for a lighter sentence, confessed and blamed Elsie for conception of the plan. This led to the incarceration of Elsie. Whenever they communicated in jail, Elsie reminded him that had he not confessed, the two might have gotten off scot-free in Montreal, as they had been planning to escape there.

== Trial ==
Believing Elsie would be given a lighter sentence as she was a woman, Jesse asked his lawyer, Calvin Pepper, to plant documents at Cherry Hill incriminating Elsie as the mastermind behind the plan as he had burned the letters she sent him. Pepper refused and told him he would not receive a lighter sentence whatever he did.

As Jesse suspected, Elsie was said to be the victim. In truth, the rifle had been bought with her money, she removed the curtain in John's room so Jesse could shoot and she was the one who could poison John's tea.

At Strang's trial, the district attorney was Edward Livingston, a relative of the Van Rensselaers and Lansings' who told Jesse to his face, "You are guilty, you must be convicted, you must die!" and Judge Duer called him a "serpent" and a "fiend". When the judge asked the jury for a verdict, the jury deliberated for less than 15 minutes before pronouncing him guilty of murder.

Three days after Strang's trial, Elsie Whipple stood trial for aiding and abetting the murder of her husband. In four days, Elsie was pronounced not guilty and cleared of charges. After Strang finished testifying on the stand at Elsie's trial, he was sentenced to death by hanging.

== Execution ==
On August 24, 1827, Jesse Strang was hanged in the last public hanging in Albany. Most of the elite in Albany lauded this as justice served. Elsie continued to live at Cherry Hill.

The murder and the stir it caused, not only Albany, but also the entire nation, and the verdict, were highly debated.

== Bibliography ==
Moore, Sean (2004). Husband Murder. Retrieved April 27, 2007, from Husband Murder, Seduction, and Female Violence Web site: https://web.archive.org/web/20060908094723/http://faculty.plattsburgh.edu/sean.moore/Chapter%204-Extract%20from%20dissertation.htm

Parker, E Retrieved May 3, 2007, Web site: http://list.msu.edu/cgi-bin/wa?A2=ind9612c&L=aejmc&P=936

Jones, Louis (1980). Murder at Cherry Hill: The Strang-Whipple Case, 1827. Historic Cherry Hill.

Whodunnit teaches history. (1991, January 13). Sunday Union,

Selections from a Van Rensselaer family library. (1768).

Visited Cherry Hill, April 27, 2007.

Quote from Edward Livingston, District Attorney.

Quote from Judge Duer

Saw gravestone of John Whipple, Albany Rural Cemetery

(2005, July). Retrieved May 17, 2007, from Elsie Van Rensselaer Lansing Web site: http://www.nysm.nysed.gov/albany/bios/vr/elvr5078.html
