= Charles W. Van Rensselaer =

American sailor lost at sea (1823–1857)

- Born: Charles Watkins Van Rensselaer; January 29, 1823
- Died: September 12, 1857 (aged 34)
- Occupation: Ship's officer
- Parent(s): John Sanders Van Rensselaer; Ann Dunkin
- Relatives: Killian K. Van Rensselaer (grandfather)
- Military career
- Allegiance: United States of America
- Branch: United States Navy
- Rank: First officer

Charles Watkins Van Rensselaer (January 29, 1823 – September 12, 1857) was the first officer and paymaster serving on board the U.S. mail ship known as the Ship of Gold, when it was lost during a hurricane in September 1857.

== Early life ==
Charles Watkins Van Rensselaer was born on January 29, 1823. He was the third son and fourth child of Judge John Sanders Van Rensselaer and Ann (née Dunkin) Van Rensselaer. As a youth, he attended The Albany Academy.

Charles was the grandson of attorney Killian K. Van Rensselaer, a Federalist politician who served in the United States Congress as a Representative from the state of New York. His siblings were: Dunkin H., Maunsell, Margaretta, Ann Elizabeth, Lydia, Harriet Letitia, Samuel Watkins, Catherine, and Louisa.

== Career ==
Van Rensselaer served for a short time as a lieutenant in the United States Revenue Service until a reduction of officers was implemented. Before the SS George Law was renamed, the position of first officer was filled by Van Rensselaer.

Author Maunsell van Rensselaer, Charles' brother, had an opportunity to be a passenger during this period. He described his brother as the person who fulfilled his duties handily. On the occasion when the captain, William Lewis Herndon fell ill, a voyage from Aspinwall to New York was left entirely in the hands of Van Rensselaer. Reportedly, he handled the vessel so well that the passengers were completely unaware of the captain's condition. During the subsequent voyages, the captain was confident that his ship was in capable hands while he visited with the passengers. According to Maunsell, the captain once encouraged Charles to take his ship and explore any place that he wished.

== Loss of the SS Central America ==
=== Background ===
Before construction of the Transcontinental railroad and the Panama Canal, one of the few options for the efficient transportation of goods from the west to the east coasts of the United States involved the use of two sea routes: the Pacific route (usually shipping out of San Francisco) and the Atlantic route (usually shipping out of New York). Both of these routes used to terminate in Panama, where ground transportation across the narrow Isthmus of Panama made commerce between the two routes simple and efficient. Formerly named the SS George Law, SS Central America was operated by the U.S. Mail Steamship Company, the side wheel steamer SS Central America, was the "multiple use" sea vessel used for passengers and government contracted cargo.

=== Sinking ===
On September 3, 1857, the SS Central America left Colón, Panama, for a port of call at Havana, Cuba. The ship was heavily loaded with about 10 tons of gold (in various forms ranging from coins, bars, and nuggets, to bags of dust). After leaving Havana, on the final leg of its voyage to New York, the ship encountered an estimated category 2 hurricane on September 9, at approximately 160 miles (260 km) off the coast of Charleston, South Carolina. High winds destroyed the sails and the steamer began taking on water. Over the next three days, the SS Central America sustained increasing damage as all efforts to bail-out water were futile due to failed pumps and the rough weather. The majority of the survivors, including all the women and children, were rescued from lifeboats and taken to shore by two passing vessels. An estimated 425 of the 578 passengers and crew perished. Survivor accounts credit Captain Herndon and first officer, Van Rensselaer, for their heroic efforts as they helped the women and children into the few available lifeboats.

=== Death of Van Rensselaer ===
One survivor of the disaster was Second officer Frazer who related that Herndon and Van Rensselaer did all that could be done. Knowing the ship would soon sink, they made their way to their staterooms, donned their uniforms, and made their way back to their post on the paddle box as the ship sank. Frazer attempted to rescue Van Rensselaer, but he refused to leave the Captain in peril. A contemporary article in The New York Times listed 124 known survivors. It reported many statements praising the two officers.

== Afterward ==
This ship has since been referred to as the 'Ship of Gold'. A modern-day search resulted in its discovery in 1987.
