= John Hill (British Army colonel) =

John Hill was an officer of the British Army who served in the American War of Independence.

== Biography ==
Hill was promoted to lieutenant colonel during the war, commanding the 9th (East Norfolk) Regiment of Foot under General John Burgoyne, and serving as deputy quartermaster for him. Hill commanded a small British detachment pursuing a retreating American force under Colonel Pierse Long, and successfully held them off at the Battle of Fort Anne, when Long rounded on his pursuers. Hill commanded the 9th again at the Battle of Bemis Heights.

John Hill was granted brevet rank as Colonel in 1782 and was succeeded as Lieutenant-Colonel of the 9th by John Campbell in 1783.
