= Edward Hunter (United States Army) =

American Army officer (1839–1929)

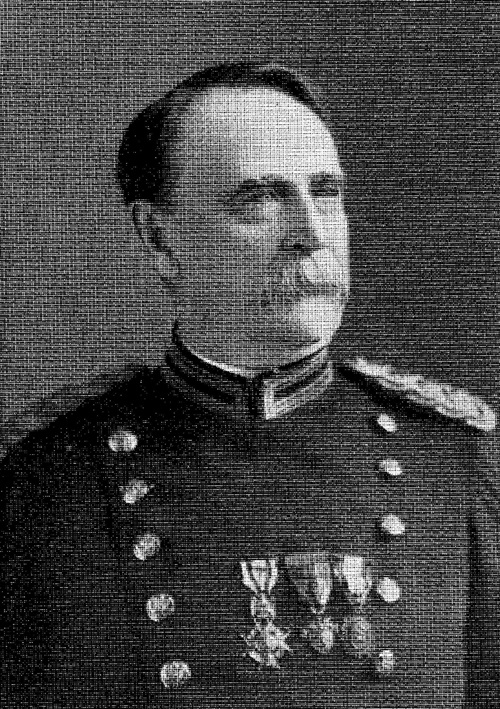
- Born: November 22, 1839; Gardiner, Maine
- Died: October 12, 1929 (aged 89); Mount Vernon, New York
- Military career
- Allegiance: United States
- Branch: US Army
- Rank: Colonel
- Units: 12th Infantry Regiment; Judge Advocate General's Corps; Adjutant General's Corps; 1st Cavalry Regiment; Department of Virginia; Department of New Mexico; Department of the Columbia; Department of California; Department of Dakota; Department of the East
- Conflicts: Nez Perce War, Bannock War, Battle of Soldier Spring, Spanish–American War

Edward Hunter (November 22, 1839 – October 12, 1929) was a career American Army officer, who graduated from the West Point on June 23, 1865. He served in California, Georgia, Idaho, Minnesota, Nevada, New York, Puerto Rico, Virginia, Washington and Washington, D.C.

== Early life and family ==
Hunter was born in Gardiner, Maine. He married Caroline Clay Hoff, (August 1, 1850 – July 24, 1931) on March 27, 1870 in San Francisco, California. He was the son-in-law of Brevet Colonel Alexander Henry Hoff, Surgeon, US Army and the brother-in-law of Colonel John Van Rennselaer Hoff, Deputy Surgeon General, US Army; January 1902.

== Career ==
He was commissioned a second lieutenant upon graduation from West Point and was promoted immediately as a first lieutenant in the 12th Infantry Regiment.

He spent his early years as an Indian fighter before transferring to the Judge Advocate General's Corps and Adjutant General's Corps. He took part in the campaigns against the Cheyenne, Arapahoe, Kiowa and Comanche, 1868; the Nez Perce War, 1877; and the Bannock War, 1878; and numerous other nameless skirmishes during that time including the Battle of Soldier Spring.

His first duty was the charge of military prisons in the Department of Virginia upon the surrender of Confederate Forces after the Civil War. These included Libby Prison (this was for Union officers only and because of its high death toll, Libby Prison is generally regarded as second in notoriety only to Andersonville Prison in Georgia) and Castle Thunder Prison (equally known for its brutality and used to hold civilians, political prisoners and spies); and the state penitentiary.

He was then transferred to the Department of New Mexico. He was promoted to captain of the 1st Cavalry Regiment in August 1880.

He transferred to the Department of the Columbia and was stationed at Fort Walla Walla, Washington Territory, (now the city of Walla Walla, Washington), and Fort Colville, (near the now the city of Colville, Washington), in 1877 during and the early 1880s. His daughter Jane Richards Hunter was born at Fort Walla Walla, Washington Territory on July 15, 1882.

He next served for two years in Washington, D.C. as an examiner of claims arising from the Civil War.

He transferred to the Department of California in San Francisco as adjutant of the 12th Infantry. He was then transferred to the 1st Cavalry Regiment and appointed first quartermaster and then adjutant of the regiment. He was adjutant-general of the expedition against the Paiutes. He read for the law and was prompted to major and judge-advocate for the Department of California in December 1888 and was admitted to the California Bar. At the time he was president of the California Sons of the American Revolution.

In 1895, he was promoted to lieutenant colonel and deputy judge-advocate and adjutant general in the Department of Dakota at Fort Snelling, St. Paul, Minnesota. When the Spanish–American War broke out he served first at Chickamauga as the mustering officer and then in 1898 he served under General Brooke as judge-advocate in Puerto Rico and as secretary of the committee on evacuation. He was invalided back to the United States because of ill health.

He was promoted to colonel and judge advocate general for the Department of the East at Governors Island, New York in May 1901. He retired in 1903 on half pay at the mandatory retirement age of 64.

== Later life ==
Hunter died at his home in Mount Vernon, New York. Hunter and his wife are interred at Arlington National Cemetery.
