= Van Rensselaer's Regiment =

Militia unit in Albany County, New York

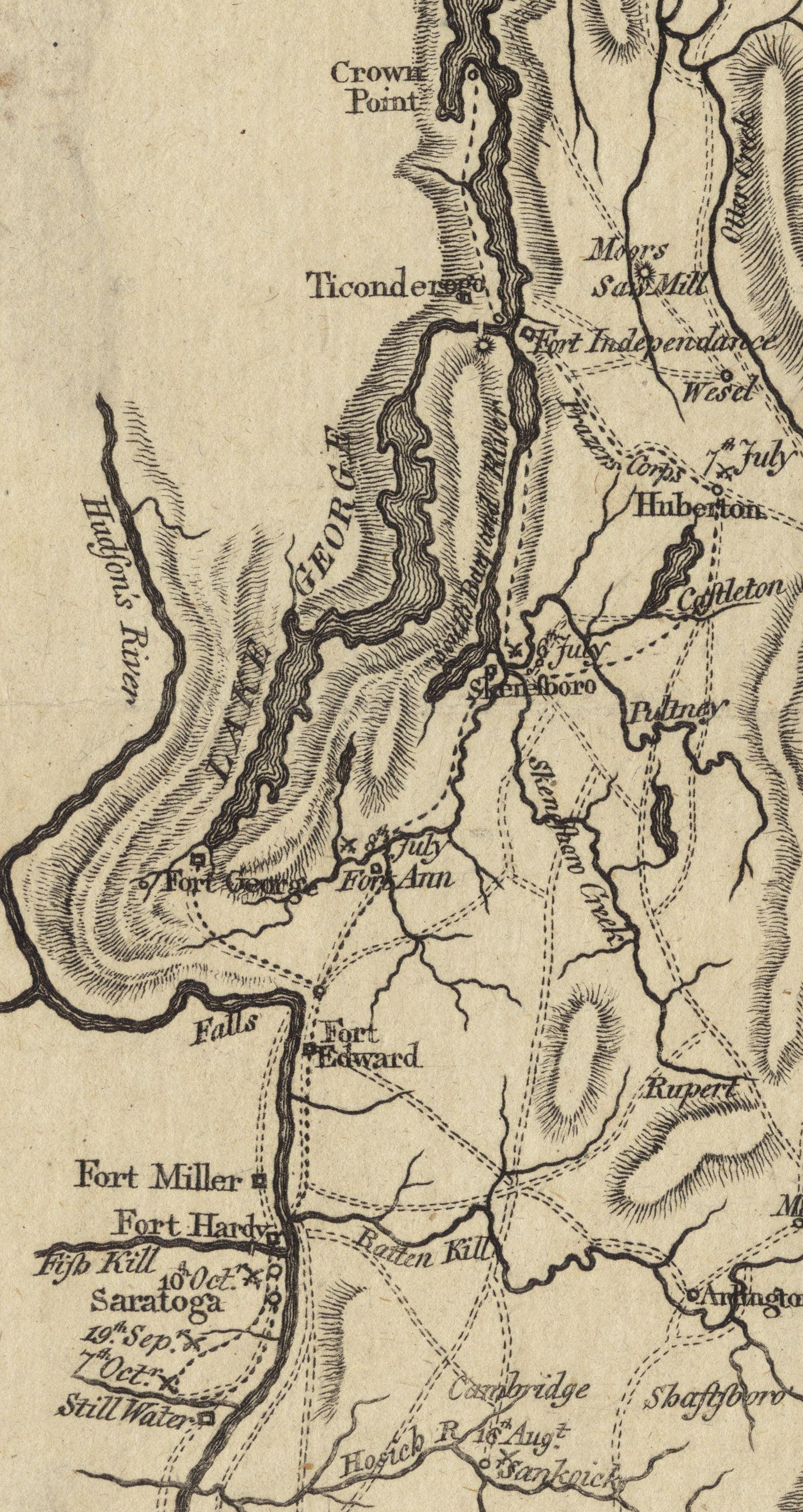

Van Rensselaer's 4th Regiment of Militia was a regiment of militia raised in Albany County, New York, during the American Revolutionary War. Raised by Colonel Kiliaen van Rensselaer in 1775, and drawing men from the Manor of Rensselaerswyck, the regiment was also known as the 2nd Rensselaerwyck Battalion and consisted of seven companies.

As a militia unit, the regiment was composed of male citizens aged between 15 and 55. They were required to serve when "called upon" for indefinite periods, but the conditions of their service meant that they could not be deployed out of the state of New York for more than three months at a time. When required, the militia supported the units of the Continental Army in battle, and undertook garrison duties in their local area.

== See also ==
- Albany County militia
