= Fort Crailo =

State historic site of New York, US

- U.S. National Register of Historic Places
- U.S. National Historic Landmark
- New York State Register of Historic Places
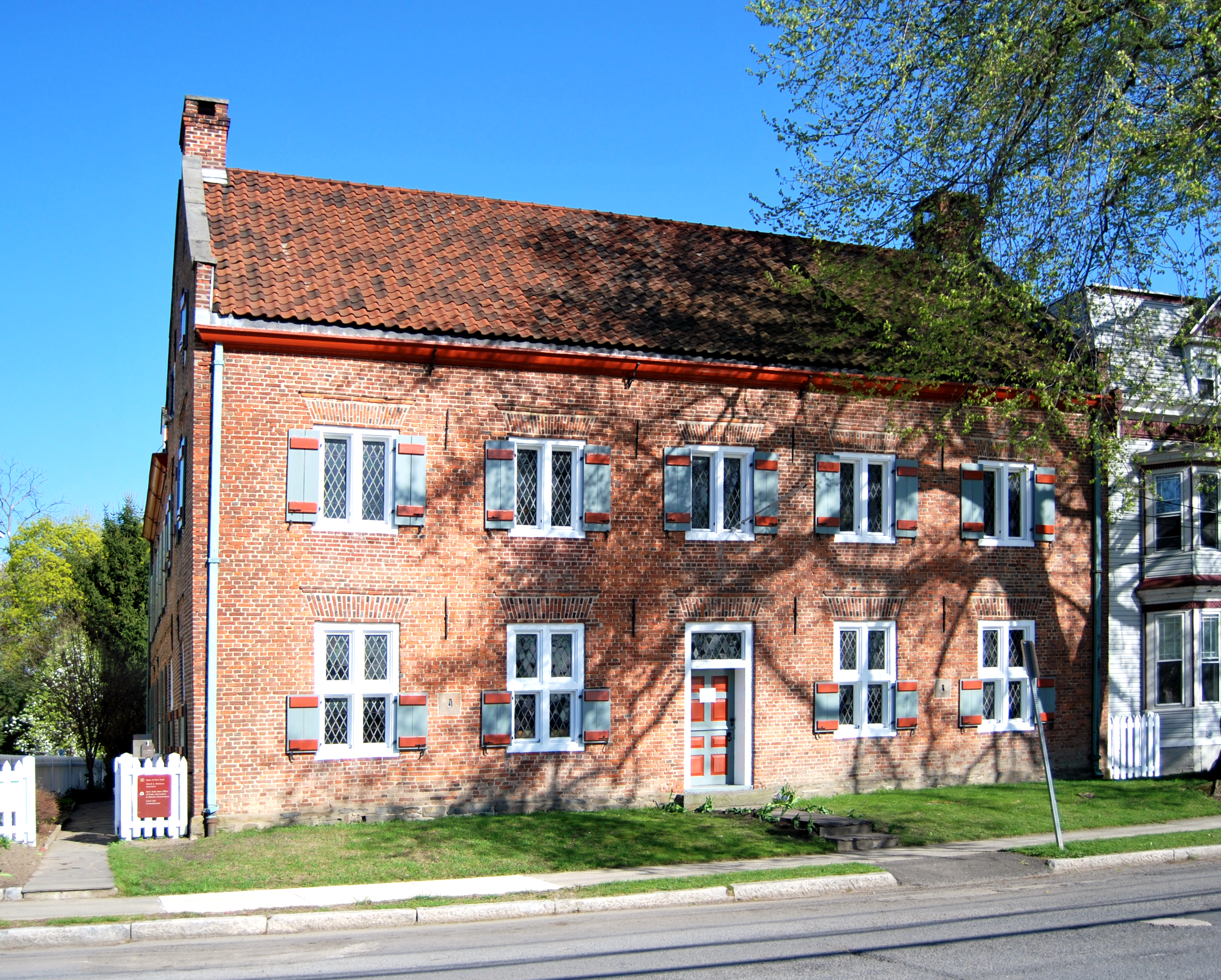
- Front elevation and north profile, with work underway on entrance walkway, in 2010

- Location within New York Location within the United States
- Location: 9½ Riverside Ave, Rensselaer, NY
- Coordinates: 42°38′7.72″N 73°44′58.65″W
- Built: c. 1712
- Architectural style: Colonial, Dutch Colonial
- NRHP reference No.: 66000563
- NYSRHP No.: 08341.000004

Significant dates
- Added to NRHP: October 15, 1966
- Designated NHL: November 11, 1961
- Designated NYSRHP: June 23, 1980

The Crailo State Historic Site (also known as Fort Crailo and Yankee Doodle House) is a historic fortified brick manor house in Rensselaer, New York, which was built in 1707. The word Crailo is derived from kraaien bos (Dutch for "crow's woods") and refers to Kiliaen van Rensselaer's estate in Huizen, Holland, which is also named "Crailo". Fort Crailo is listed on the National Register of Historic Places.

== History ==
Starting as early as 1663 through the 18th century, the area surrounding the site had become synonymously known as Greenbush. The property consisted of flat alluvial farmlands, orchards, mills, a store, and ferry rights to Albany. As early as 1663, the estate later known as Hendrick's manor had a small fort for the protection of the local inhabitants from Indian attacks during the Esopus Wars and in 1675 during King Philip's War the local militia captain was instructed to install a palisade around this fort. The fields and farm buildings at Crailo were used to quarter British and colonial troops as early as 1694 and at intervals during each of the French and Indian wars.

The property was inherited by Hendrick van Rensselaer, Kiliean's grandson, who built the house in 1707. His son, Johannes, was a captain in the colonial militia. Captain van Rensselaer inherited Crailo in 1740. The gunports were likely added after a raiding party of 80 French and Indians attacked Greenbush, killing up to five persons in 1746. The inhabitants of Albany witnessed this assault from across the river but troops were unable to cross in time to defend Greenbush. In 1751 and 1754 Captain van Rensselaer provided candles and firewood to the colonial garrisons at Albany and Schenectady. The house was expanded in 1762. The loopholes on the lower floor indicate the original defensive nature of the house.

Fort Crailo is reportedly the place where, in 1755, British Army surgeon Richard Shuckburgh, quartered in the home, wrote the ditty "Yankee Doodle" to mock the New England colonial troops who fought with the British in the French and Indian Wars.

Fort Crailo was declared a National Historic Landmark in 1961.

The fort is operated by the State of New York as a museum of the Colonial Dutch culture in New York State. Exhibits include clothing, furniture, household and decorative items, and archaeological artifacts from "New Netherland" historic sites in New York and New Jersey. Many artifacts from the Fort Orange archeological dig in the early 1970s are on display.

== Gallery ==
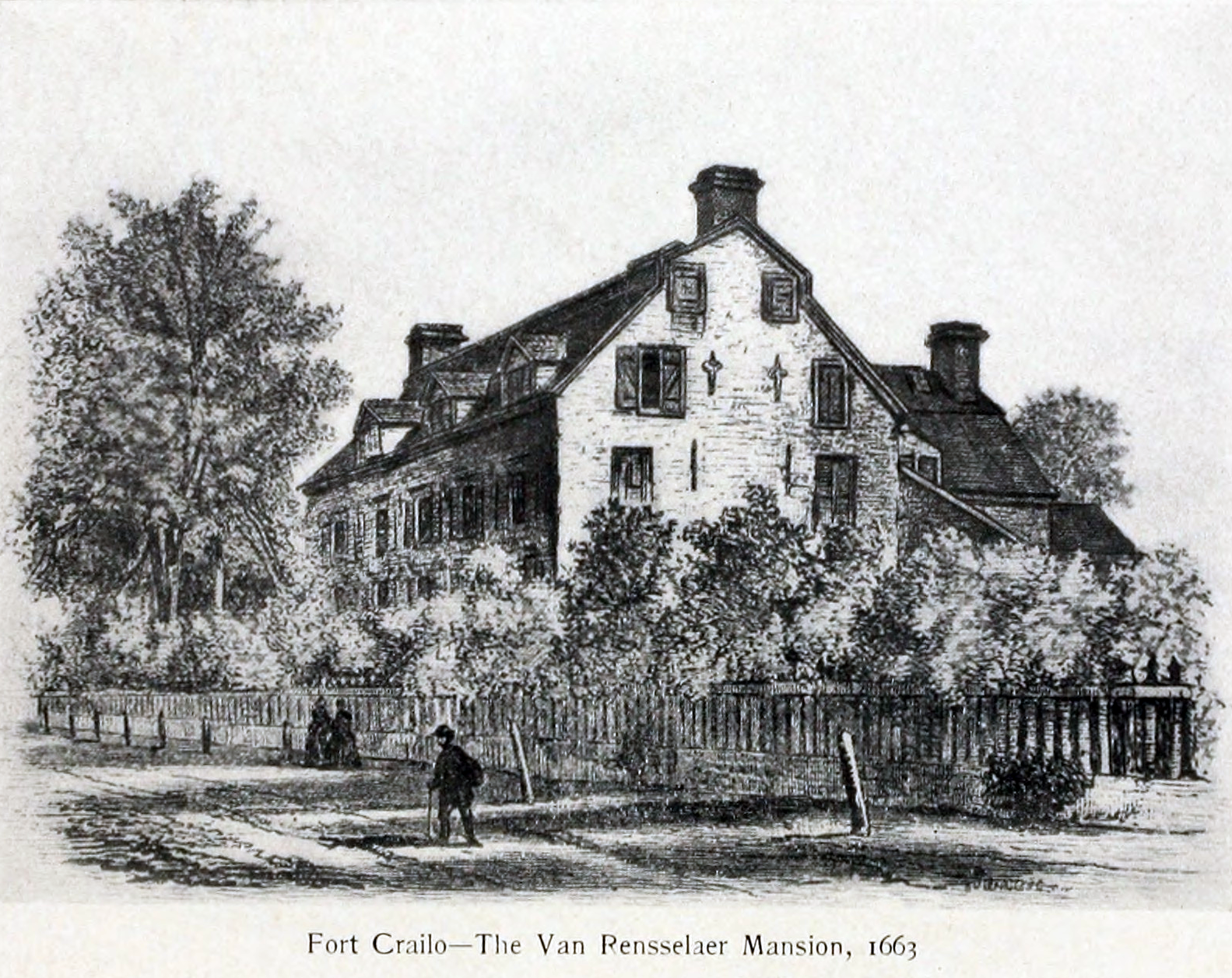
Fort Crailo in 1907

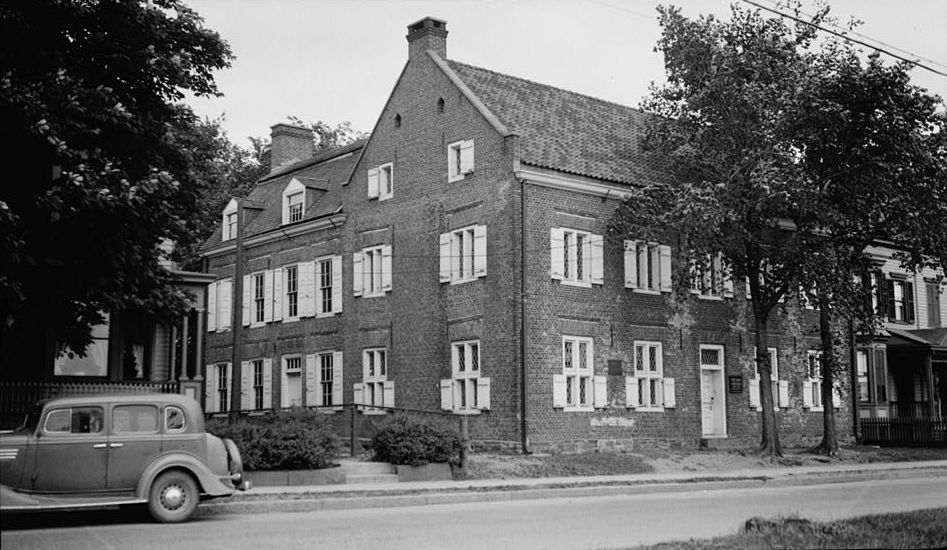
Fort Crailo in HABS photo, c. 1940

== See also ==
- List of National Historic Landmarks in New York
- List of New York State Historic Sites
