= Philip Kiliaen van Rensselaer =

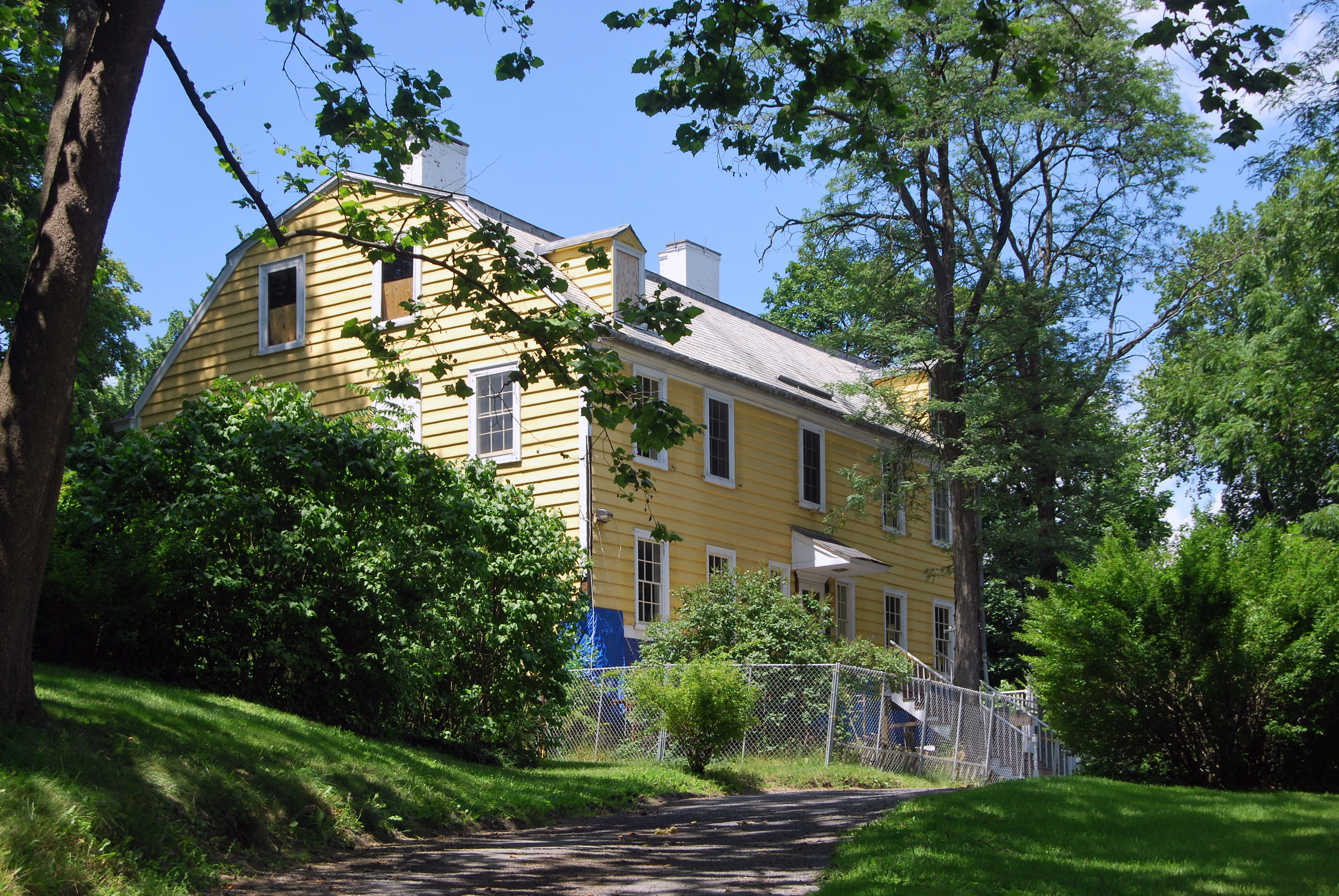
Cherry Hill – van Rensselaer farm house or (Manor House)

Philip Kiliaen van Rensselaer (May 19, 1747 – March 3, 1798) was the second son of Colonel Kiliaen van Rensselaer and Ariaantie (Schuyler). He was a merchant by trade, and his experience in transporting cargo may have helped qualify him as keeper of the Albany arsenal. He was variously referred to as storekeeper, military storekeeper and Commissary for the Northern Department.

== Life ==
He was appointed as keeper of the store in 1775 and the appointment was confirmed by the Continental Congress. He was also a member of the Committee of Public Safety of Albany.

During the American Revolution, armourers were scarce. This is evident in George Washington's handwritten orders in a letter addressed to him. The letter also includes a list of his duties, such as arranging the repair of service muskets and transporting the overload.

He was elected in May 1776 to the Albany Committee of Correspondence, second ward. Philip sat alongside his father and at least one of his brothers, Nicholas. Philip continued serving on that committee until it was dissolved. He was elected alderman for the second ward of Albany in 1782. van Rensselaer leased a tavern five miles west of the Hudson as he developed the Cherry Hill farm.

His family house was on the east side of Pearl Street when he built Cherry Hill in 1768 for his wife Maria, daughter of Robert Sanders and granddaughter of Pieter Schuyler. Maria was also descended from Rev. Lawrence Sanders "...who suffered martyrdom at Coventry, England, 1556, during the reign of Bloody Mary".

They married on what was then Van Rensselaer property between the river and south of the city line. This general area was the location of military stores and quarters during the American Revolution lending to an ironic contrast of imagery to 'their romantic spot'.

== Family ==
- Father: Col. Kiliaen van Rensselaer (Dec 27, 1717 – Dec 28, 1781) was commissioned Colonel of the 4th Regiment, Albany County Militia Oct 20, 1775 during the Revolutionary War and chairman of the Committee of Correspondence and served in the Legislature.
- Son: Philip P van Rensselaer (1783 – Feb 17, 1827)
