= Gramercy Park =

Neighborhood and park in New York City

- Neighborhood and park
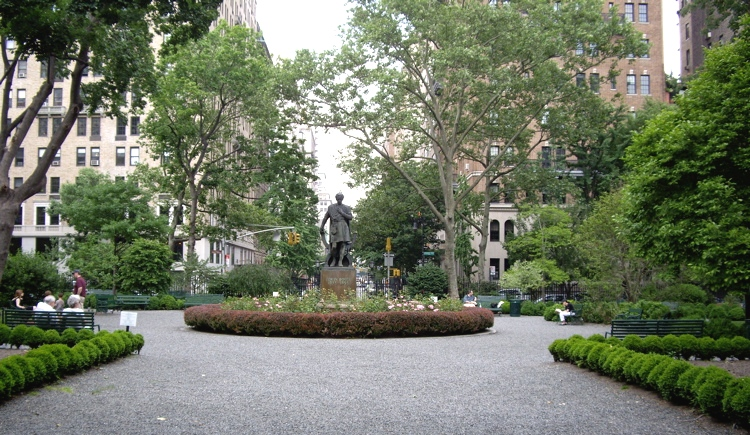
- The view from the south gate of Gramercy Park, looking north from Gramercy Park South (East 20th Street), with the statue of Edwin Booth in the center. The Gramercy Park Hotel is visible in the left background (May 2007).
- Interactive map of Gramercy Park
- Coordinates: 40.738°N 73.986°W
- Country: United States
- State: New York
- City: New York City
- Borough: Manhattan
- Community District: Manhattan 5, Manhattan 6

Population (2010)
  - Total: 27,988
- Time zone: UTC−5 (Eastern)
  - Summer (DST): UTC−4 (EDT)
- ZIP Codes: 10003, 10010
- Area codes: 212, 332, 646, and 917
- Gramercy Park Historic District
- U.S. National Register of Historic Places
- U.S. Historic district
- New York State Register of Historic Places
- New York City Landmark
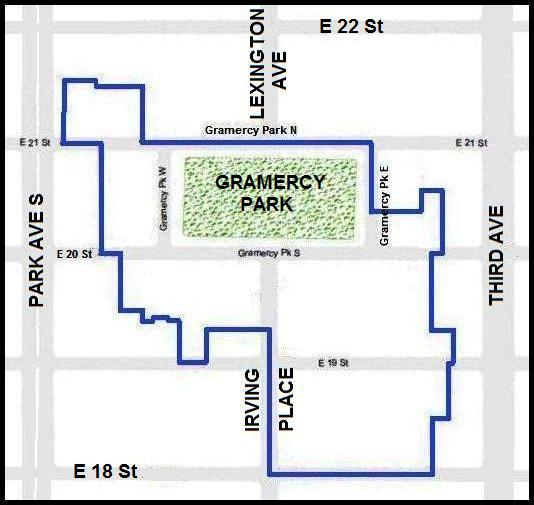
- Location: Manhattan, New York City; Roughly bounded by: Third Avenue; Park Avenue S.; E. 18th Street; E. 22nd Street
- Coordinates: 40°44′16″N 73°59′10″W
- Architectural style: Greek Revival, Italianate, Gothic Revival
- NRHP reference No.: 80002691
- NYCL No.: 0251

Significant dates
- Added to NRHP: January 23, 1980
- Designated NYSRHP: June 23, 1980
- Designated NYCL: September 20, 1966

Gramercy Park (Note: Sometimes misspelled as Grammercy) (/ˈɡræmərsi/) is the name of both a small, fenced-in private park, and the surrounding neighborhood (which is also referred to as Gramercy), in Manhattan in New York City.

The approximately 2-acre (0.8 ha) park, located in the Gramercy Park Historic District, is one of two private parks in New York City – the other is Sunnyside Gardens Park in Queens – as well as one of only three in the state; the public is not generally allowed in and only people residing around the park who pay an annual fee have a key. The sidewalks of the streets around the park are a popular jogging, strolling, and dog-walking route.

The neighborhood is mostly located within Manhattan Community District 6, with a small portion in Community District 5. It is generally perceived to be quiet and safe.

The neighborhood, associated historic district, and park have generally received positive reviews. Calling it "a Victorian gentleman who has refused to die", Charlotte Devree in The New York Times said in 1957 that "There is nothing else quite like Gramercy Park in the country." When the New York City Landmarks Preservation Commission created the Gramercy Park Historic District in 1966, they quoted from John B. Pine's 1921 book, The Story of Gramercy Park:

The laying out of Gramercy Park represents one of the earliest attempts in this country at 'City Planning'. ... As a park given to the prospective owners of the land surrounding it and held in trust for those who made their homes around it, Gramercy Park is unique in this City, and perhaps in this country, and represents the only neighborhood, with possibly one exception, which has remained comparatively unchanged for eighty years – the Park is one of the City's Landmarks.

== Boundaries ==
Gramercy Park itself is located between East 20th Street (called Gramercy Park South at the park), and East 21st Street (called Gramercy Park North), and between Gramercy Park West and Gramercy Park East, two mid-block streets which lie between Park Avenue South and Third Avenue. Irving Place commences at the southern end of Gramercy Park, running to 14th Street, and Lexington Avenue, a major north–south thoroughfare on the East Side of Manhattan, terminates at the northern end.

The neighborhood's boundaries are 14th Street to the south, First Avenue to the east, 23rd Street to the north, and Park Avenue South to the west. Nearby are the Flatiron District to the west, Union Square to the southwest, the East Village to the south, Stuyvesant Town and Peter Cooper Village to the east, Rose Hill to the northwest, and Kips Bay to the northeast. (Note: Neighborhoods in New York City do not have official status, and their boundaries are not specifically set by the city. (There are a number of Community Boards, whose boundaries are officially set, but these are fairly large and generally contain a number of neighborhoods, and the neighborhood map issued by the Department of City Planning only shows the largest ones.))

The boundaries of the Historic District, set in 1966 and extended in 1988, are irregular. A proposed extension to the district would include more than 40 additional buildings on Gramercy Park East and North, Lexington Avenue, Park Avenue South, East 22nd and East 19th Streets, and Irving Place.

== Etymology ==
The area received its name as an anglicization of Crommessie, which is derived from the Dutch Krom Moerasje, meaning "little crooked swamp", or Krom Mesje, meaning "little crooked knife", describing the shape of the swamp, brook and hill on the site. The brook, which later became known as Crommessie Vly, flowed in a 40-foot gully along what is now 21st Street into the East River at 18th Street. Krom Moerasje/Krom Mesje became corrupted to Crommessie or Crommashie. Mayor James Duane – for whom the city's Duane Street is named – acquired the site in 1761 from Gerardus Stuyvesant and named it Gramercy Seat. Gramercy is an archaic English word meaning 'many thanks'.

== History ==
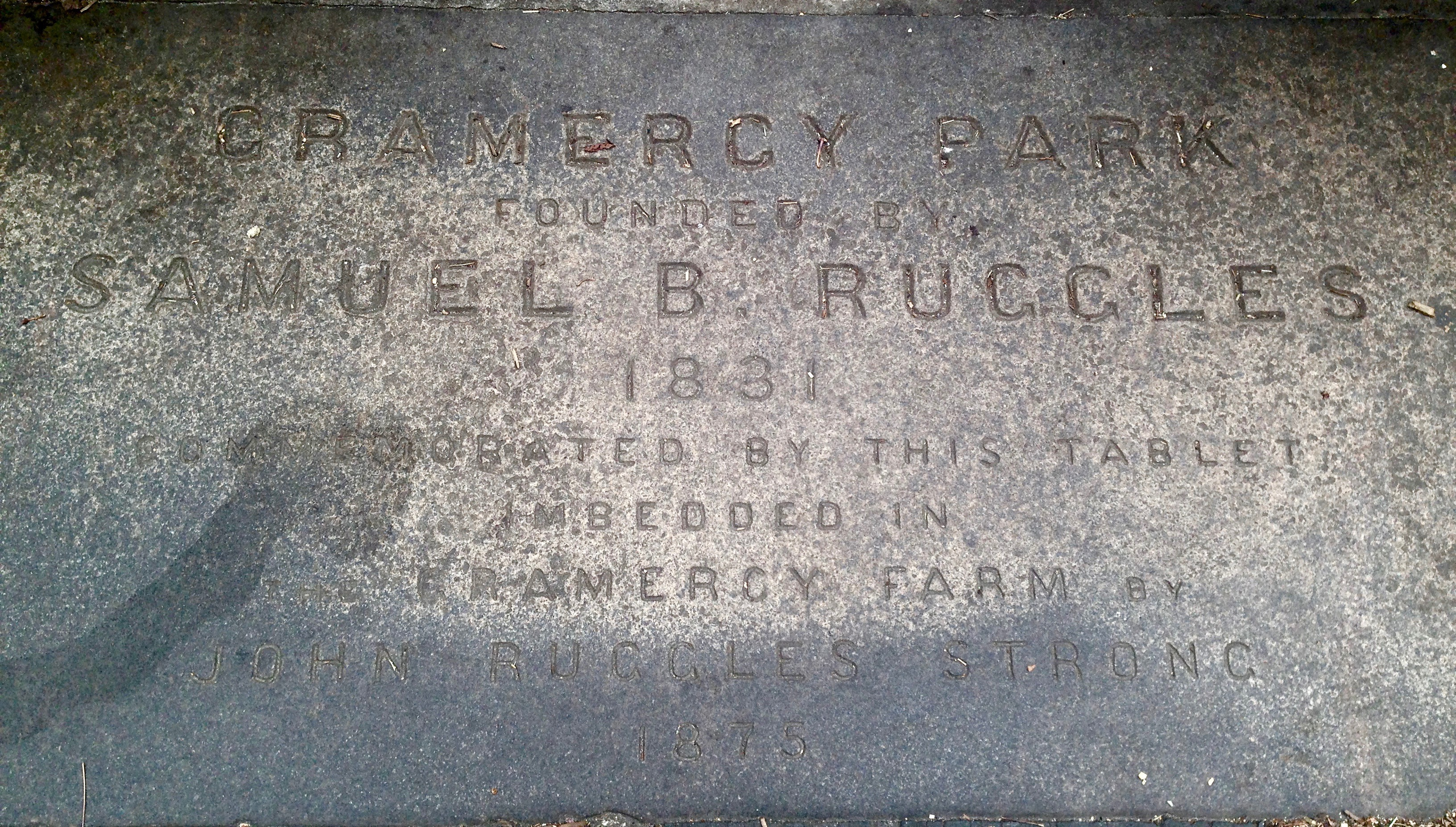
Flagstone near west gate to Gramercy Park bearing the words "Gramercy Park Founded By Samuel B. Ruggles 1831 Commemorated By This Tablet Imbedded in the Gramercy Farm By John Ruggles Strong 1875"

=== Origin and development ===
The area which is now Gramercy Park was once in the middle of a swamp. In 1831 Samuel B. Ruggles, a developer and advocate of open space, proposed the idea for the park due to the northward growth of Manhattan. He bought the property, 22 acres of what was then a farm called "Gramercy Farm", from the heirs of James Duane, son of the former mayor, father of Army engineer James Chatham Duane, and a descendant of Peter Stuyvesant. Ruggles then deeded the land on December 17, 1832, to five trustees, who pledge to hold 42 lots in trust to be used as parkland. To develop the property, Ruggles spent $180,000 to landscape it, draining the swamp and causing about a million horsecart loads of earth to be moved. He then laid out "Gramercy Square", deeding possession of the square to the owners of the 66 parcels of land he had plotted to surround it, and sought tax-exempt status for the park, which the city's Board of Aldermen granted in 1832. It was the second private square created in the city, after Hudson Square, also known as St. John's Park, which was laid out by the parish of Trinity Church. Numbering of the lots began at No. 1 on the northwest corner, on Gramercy Park West, and continued counter-clockwise: south down Gramercy Park West, then west to east along Gramercy Park South (East 20th Street), north up Gramercy Park East, and finally east to west along Gramercy Park North (East 21st Street).

As part of his overall plan for the square, Ruggles received permission on January 28, 1833 from the Board of Alderman to open up Fourth Avenue, which had been limited to use by trains, to vehicular traffic. He also brought about the creation by the state legislature of Lexington Avenue and Irving Place, (Note: Ruggles named Irving Place after Washington Irving, but Irving never lived there, although he frequently visited a nephew who lived nearby.) two new north–south roads laid out between Third and Fourth Avenues and feeding into his development at the top and bottom of the park. The new streets reduced the number of lots around the park from 66 to 60.

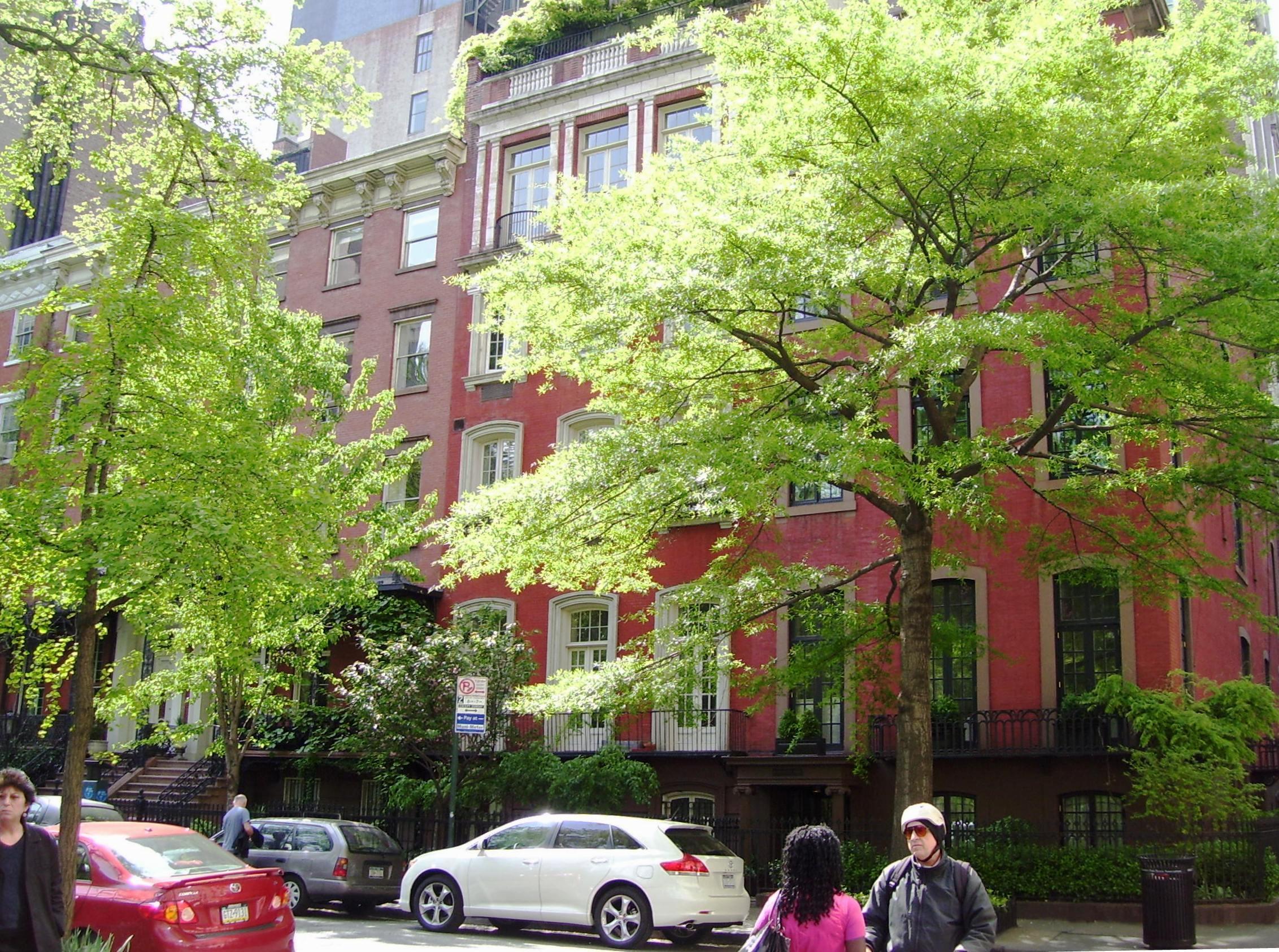
Some of the original townhouses surrounding the park; these at No. 1 through No. 4 Gramercy Park were built between 1844 and 1850.

Gramercy Park was enclosed by a fence in 1833, but construction on the surrounding lots did not begin until the 1840s, due to the Panic of 1837. In one regard this was fortunate, since the opening of the Croton Aqueduct in 1842 allowed new townhouses to be constructed with indoor plumbing.

The first formal meeting of the park's trustees took place in 1844 at 17 Union Square (West), the mansion of James W. Gerard, which is no longer extant, having been demolished in 1938. By that time, landscaping had already begun with the hiring of James Virtue in 1838, who planted privet inside the fence as a border; by 1839 pathways had been laid out and trees and shrubs planted. Major planting also took place in 1844 – the same year the park's gates were first locked – followed by additional landscaping by Brinley & Holbrook in 1916. These plantings had the effect of softening the park's prim formal design.

=== Later 19th century events ===
In 1863, in an unprecedented gesture, Gramercy Park was opened to Union soldiers involved in putting down the violent draft riots which broke out in New York, after conscription was introduced for the Civil War. Gramercy Park itself had been protected with howitzers by troops from the Eighth Regiment Artillery, while the 152nd New York Volunteers encamped in nearby Stuyvesant Square.

At No. 34 and No. 36 Gramercy Park (East) are two of New York's first apartment buildings, designed in 1883 and 1905. In addition, No. 34 is the oldest existing co-operative apartment building in the city. Elsewhere in the neighborhood, nineteenth century brownstones and carriage houses abound, though the 1920s brought the onset of tenant apartments and skyscrapers to the area.

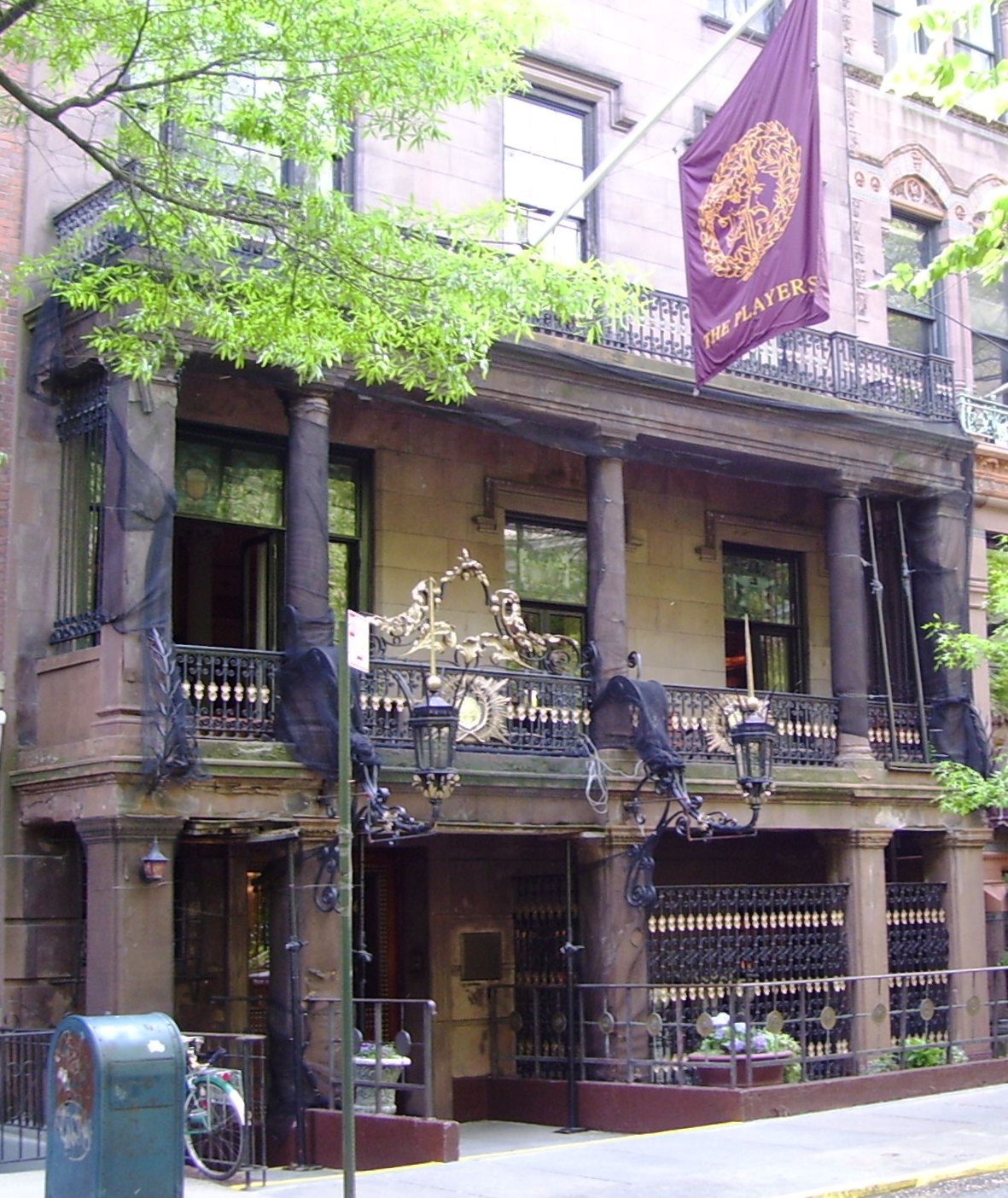
Exterior of The Players, a club founded in 1888 by actor Edwin Booth, at No. 16 Gramercy Park (South)

In 1890 an attempt was made to run a cable car through the park to connect Irving Place to Lexington Avenue. The bill passed the New York State Legislature, but was vetoed by Governor David B. Hill. Twenty-two years later, in 1912, another proposal would have connected Irving Place and Lexington Avenue, bisecting the park, but was defeated through the efforts of the Gramercy Park Association, now called Gramercy Neighborhood Associates.

In the late 19th century, numerous charitable institutions influential in setting social policy were located on 23rd Street, and some, such as the Federation of Protestant Welfare Agencies, still remain in the area. Calvary Church on Gramercy Park North has a food pantry that opens its doors once a week for one hour, and the Brotherhood Synagogue on Gramercy Park South served as an Underground Railroad station before the Civil War, when the building was a Quaker meeting house, established in 1859.

=== 20th and 21st centuries ===
The Hotel Irving, at 26 Gramercy Park South, was constructed c. 1903. Among its guests was a young Preston Sturges, who stayed there in 1914 while his mother lived with Isadora Duncan at the Ritz-Carlton Hotel. A townhouse on the north side of the Park was provided for Duncan's dancing school, and their studio was nearby on the northeast corner of Park Avenue South (then Fourth Avenue) and 23rd Street. The Hotel Irving was converted to a co-op in 1986.

In the center of the park is a statue of one of the area's most famous residents, Edwin Booth, which was dedicated on November 13, 1918. Booth was one of the great Shakespearean actors of 19th century America, as well as the brother of John Wilkes Booth, the assassin of Abraham Lincoln. The mansion at No. 16 Gramercy Park (South) was purchased by Booth and renovated by Stanford White at his request to be the home of the Players' Club, which Booth founded. He turned over the deed to the building on New Year's Eve 1888. Next door at No. 15 Gramercy Park (South) is the National Arts Club, established in 1884 in a Victorian Gothic mansion which was originally home to the New York Governor and 1876 Presidential Candidate, Samuel J. Tilden. Tilden had steel doors and an escape tunnel to East 19th Street to protect himself from the sometimes violent politics of the day.

On September 20, 1966, a part of the Gramercy Park neighborhood was designated an historic district, the boundaries of which were extended on July 12, 1988. The district was listed on the National Register of Historic Places in 1980. A proposed extension of the district would include nearby buildings such as the Manhattan Trade School for Girls, now the School of the Future, and the Children's Court and Family Court buildings, now part of Baruch College, all on East 22nd Street.

In 1983, Fantasy Fountain, a 4.5 stone (63 lb; 29 kg) bronze sculpture by Greg Wyatt was installed in the park.

One of the most significant steam explosions in New York City occurred near Gramercy Park in 1989, killing two Consolidated Edison workers and one bystander, and causing damage of several million dollars to area buildings.

In 2012, 18 Gramercy Park South – formerly the Salvation Army's Parkside Evangeline Residence for Women and then a facility of the School of Visual Arts – was sold to Eyal Ofer's Global Holdings and the Zeckendorf brothers for $60 million for conversion into condominium apartments by Robert A. M. Stern, including a $42 million penthouse duplex. The 17-story building is the tallest around the park and dates from 1927. Luxury residential buildings were developed in Gramercy in the 2010s and 2020s, and many existing buildings were converted to luxury apartments. At the same time, pre-1940 structures still comprised nearly half of the area's housing stock.

== Ownership and access to the park ==
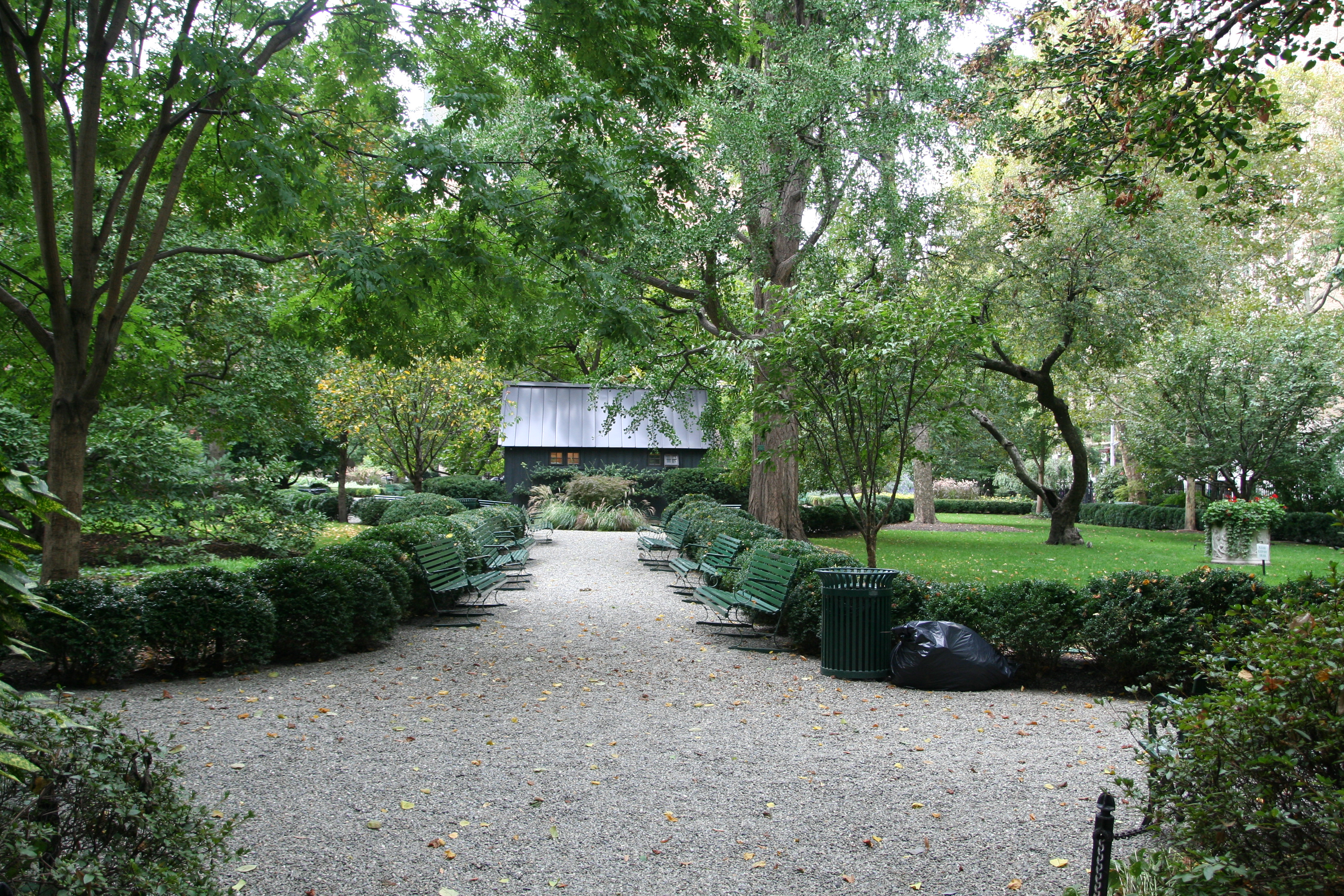
Interior of the park, as seen through the fence from Gramercy Park East

Since December 31, 1831, Gramercy Park has been held in common by the owners of the 39 surrounding structures. Two keys are allocated to each of the original lots surrounding the park, and the owners may buy keys for a fee, which was originally $10 per key, but as of 2008 was $350, with a $1,000 fee for lost keys, which rises to $2,000 for a second instance. The Medeco locks are changed annually, and any property that does not pay the annual assessment of $7,500 per lot has its key privileges revoked; additionally, the keys are very hard to duplicate. As of 2012, there were 383 keys in circulation, each individually numbered and coded.

Members of Players Club and the National Arts Club as well as guests of the Gramercy Park Hotel, which has 12 keys, have access, as does Calvary Church and the Brotherhood Synagogue; hotel guests are escorted to the park and picked up later by hotel staff. In addition, the owners of the luxury condominium apartments at 57 Irving Place, completed in 2012, can obtain key access to the park by becoming members of the Players Club, even though the building is located several blocks from the park.

At one time, the park was open to the public on an annual Gramercy Day whose date changed each year but was often the first Saturday in May. In 2007, the trustees announced that the park would no longer be open for Gramercy Day because it "had turned into a street fair". The park, however, continues to be open to the public on Christmas Eve. Visitors to the park may not drink alcohol, smoke, ride a bicycle, walk a dog, play ball or Frisbee, or feed the birds and squirrels.

In 2001, Aldon James of the National Arts Club that adjoins the park brought about 40 children, mostly minorities, into the park from the nearby Washington Irving High School on Irving Place. The trustee at the time, Sharen Benenson, called police alleging that the children were trespassing. The police refused to take action. Later, a suit was filed against the park's administration in Federal Court. The suit was settled out of court in 2003. Most of the children settled for $36,000 each, while one received $50,000.

In December 2014, it was revealed in The New York Times that 360-degree panoramic pictures of the interior of the park – taken using Photo Sphere, a Google app within Google Street View, by Shawn Christopher from the Pittsburgh area – had been posted to Google Maps. Christopher got access to the park by renting a room through the Airbnb service and using the key to the park which came with the room. The Gramercy Park Block Association – which did not know about the photographs until informed by a Times reporter – did not give Christopher permission to shoot in the park, and he was unaware that photography was generally forbidden.

== Demographics ==
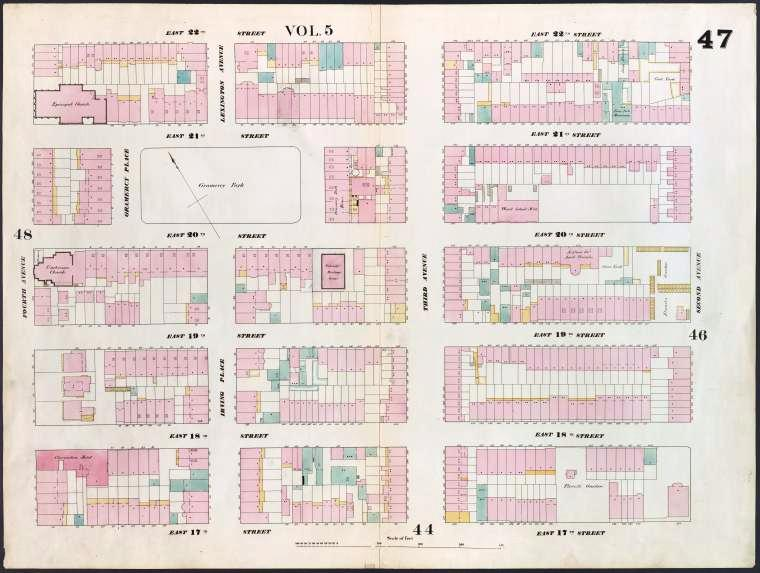
An 1853 real estate map of the area around Gramercy Park

Based on data from the 2010 United States census, the population of Gramercy Park was 27,988, an increase of 1,804 (6.9%) from the 26,184 counted in 2000. Covering an area of 171.71 acres (69.49 ha), the neighborhood had a population density of 163.0 inhabitants per acre (104,300/sq mi; 40,300/km^{2}). The racial makeup of the neighborhood was 73.7% (20,623) White, 3.3% (923) African American, 0.1% (19) Native American, 13.4% (3,740) Asian, 0.0% (10) Pacific Islander, 0.3% (77) from other races, and 2.0% (573) from two or more races. Hispanic or Latino of any race were 7.2% (2,023) of the population.

== Surrounding neighborhood ==
The neighborhood, which is called either "Gramercy Park" or "Gramercy", is generally considered to be a quiet and safe area. While real estate in Manhattan is rarely stable, the apartments in the neighborhood around Gramercy Park have experienced little turmoil. East 19th Street between Third Avenue and Irving has been called "Block Beautiful" for its wide array of architecture and pristine aesthetic. Townhouses with generous backyards and smaller apartments alike coincide in a collage of architecture in Gramercy Park. The largest private house in the neighborhood, a 42-room mansion on Gramercy Park South, was on sale for $7 million in 1993.

The Gramercy Park neighborhood is located in the part of Manhattan where the bedrock Manhattan schist is located deeper underground than it is above 29th Street and below Canal Street, and as a result, and under the influence of zoning laws, the tallest buildings in the area top out at around 20 stories, and older buildings of 3–6 floors are numerous, especially on the side streets, but even on the avenues.

The neighborhood also contains Stuyvesant Square, another smaller park, bisected by Second Avenue. The park is bordered by Rutherford and Perlman Places, East 15th and East 17th Street.

The quiet streets perpendicular to Irving Place have maintained their status as fashionable residential blocks reminiscent of London's West End. In 1912, a multiple dwelling planned specifically for bachelors appeared at 52 Irving Place. A Colonial Revival style structure with suites of rooms that lacked kitchen facilities was one of a small group of New York apartment houses planned for single men in the early years of the 20th century.

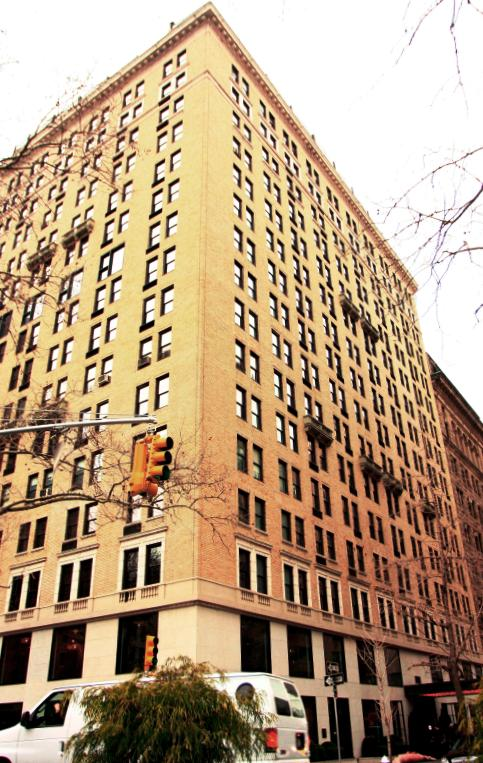
Gramercy Park Hotel

=== Gramercy Park Hotel ===
Gramercy Park Hotel was originally designed by Robert T. Lyons and built by Bing & Bing in 1925, replacing a row of townhouses. It was managed for many years by hotelier Herbert Weissberg, and in 2006 underwent a massive makeover by Ian Schrager, who in 2010 sold his interests and is no longer associated with the hotel. Interiors were designed by artist and filmmaker Julian Schnabel. The Hotel has views of Gramercy Park, and guests have access to the hotel's 12 keys to the park during their stay. Dining venues include the Rose Bar and Jade Bar, and rooftop Gramercy Terrace restaurant; Danny Meyer's Maialino is also in the Hotel.

The hotel was the subject of a 2008 documentary film, Hotel Gramercy Park.

=== Irving Place ===
An assortment of restaurants, bars, and establishments line Irving Place, the main thoroughfare of the neighborhood south of the park. Pete's Tavern, New York's oldest surviving saloon, and where O. Henry is often erroneously said to have written The Gift of the Magi, survived Prohibition disguised as a flower shop. Irving Plaza, at East 15th Street and Irving, hosts numerous concerts for both well-known and indie bands and draws a crowd almost every night. There are also a number of clinics and official city buildings on Irving Place. The street has also lent its name to Irving, a neighborhood print magazine covering the people, culture, and businesses of the Gramercy area.

== Education ==
=== Schools ===
Two public high schools are located in the area: Washington Irving High School on Irving Place, and the School of the Future on 22nd Street at Lexington Avenue, which is also a middle school.

P.S. 40, the Augustus Saint-Gaudens School, serving grades Pre-K to 5, is the only general public elementary school in the neighborhood; it is located on East 20th Street between First and Second Avenues, near the Augustus Saint-Gaudens Playground, Peter's Field, and the park at Stuyvesant Square. The building also houses a middle school named after Jonas Salk: the Salk School of Science, serving grades 6–8. M.S. 104 the Simon Baruch Middle School, which also serves grades 6–8, is located just east of, P.S. 40 and Salk, on the same block but across the street. Nearby, on East 23rd Street, is the American Sign Language and English School, a public elementary and middle school which provides American Sign Language immersion education for deaf and hearing children. The ASL and English School building also hosts other public school programs.

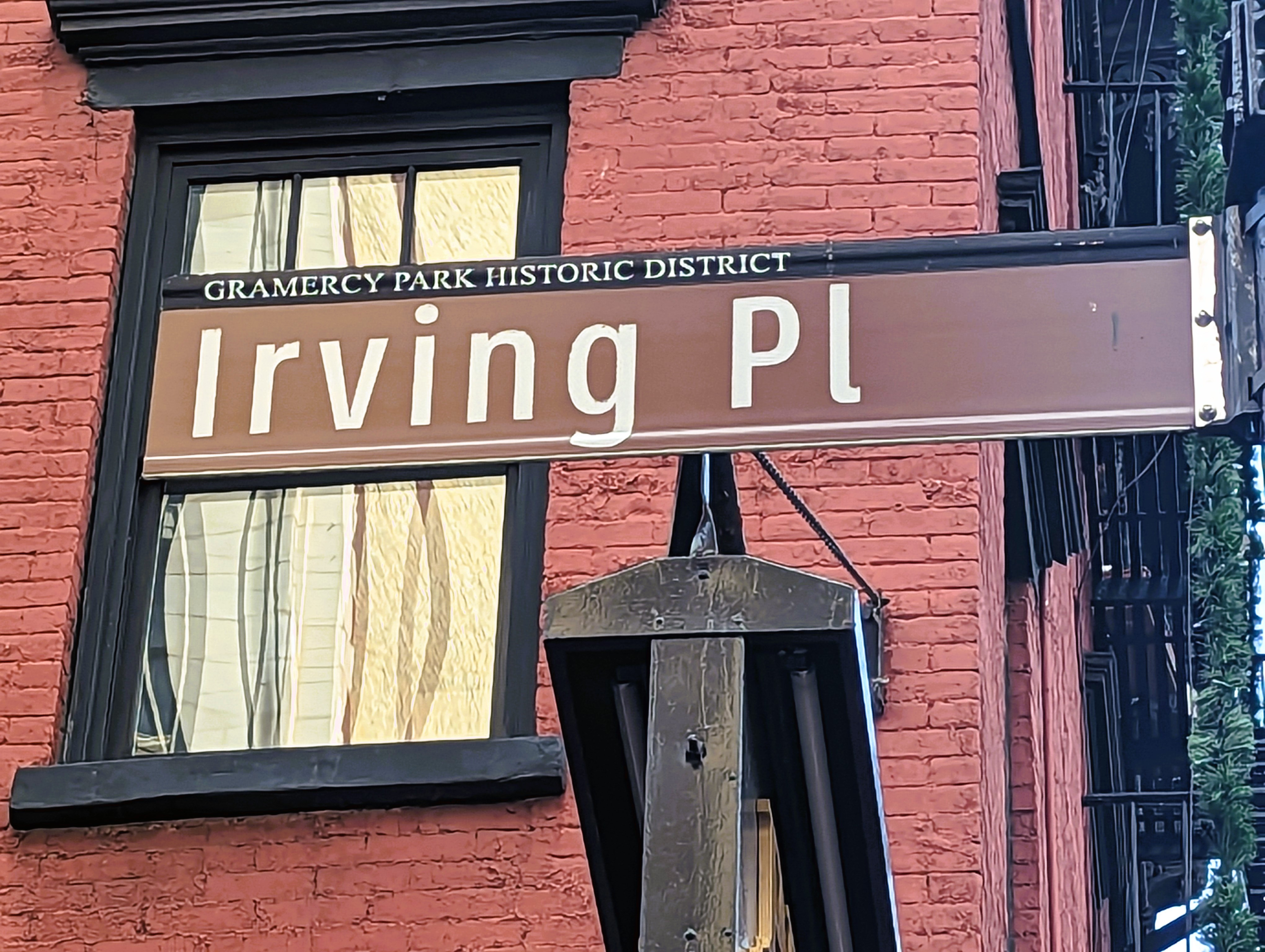
Gramercy Park Historic District sign on Irving Place

Also located in the neighborhood is The Epiphany School, a Catholic elementary school on 22nd Street at Second Avenue. Founded in 1885 for religious instruction in the parish of the Epiphany, the school has been a landmark – gutted and rebuilt – in the neighborhood for generations. At 20th Street and Second Avenue is a new building for the Learning Spring School, a private school for high-functioning autistic children funded by the Simons Foundation Autism Research Initiative. The building houses an elementary and middle school, grades K-8.

The École Internationale de New York, a French international school, is primarily located in the Gramercy Park neighborhood, partly at 111 East 22nd Street between Park and Lexington Avenues, where the 1st, 2nd and 3rd grades and the Middle School are sited; and partly in the "Renwick Gem" of Calvary Church at 277 Park Avenue, where the 4th and 5th grades are located. There is also a preschool at 206 Fifth Avenue between West 25th and 26th Streets in the NoMad neighborhood.

=== Higher education ===
The buildings of Baruch College of the City University of New York (CUNY) are located in the neighborhood or nearby. Baruch College's Lawrence and Eris Field Building is located at the southeast corner of Lexington Avenue and 23rd Street in Gramercy. The facilities of The School of Visual Arts are located on East 23rd Street and elsewhere. SVA students are housed in Gramercy Park Women's Residence, George Washington Hotel and the New Residence. In addition, New York University's Gramercy Green dormitory is located in Gramercy.

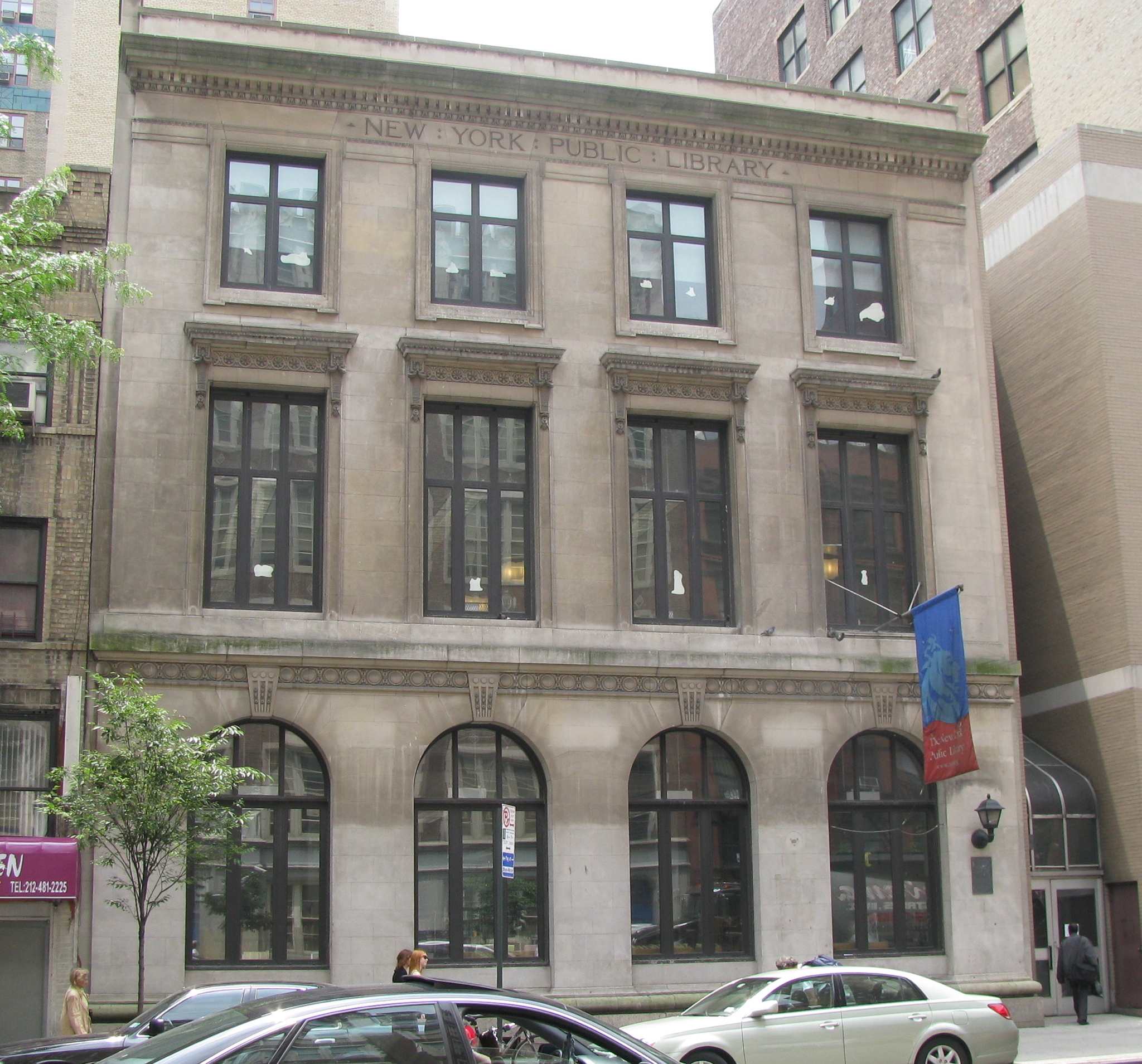
The New York Public Library's Epiphany branch on East 23rd Street

=== Library ===
The New York Public Library (NYPL)'s Epiphany branch is located at 228 East 23rd Street. The Epiphany branch opened in 1887 and moved to its current structure, a two-story Carnegie library, in 1907. It was renovated from 1982 to 1984.

== Police and crime ==
Gramercy, along with Stuyvesant Town and Madison Square, is patrolled by the 13th Precinct of the NYPD, located at 230 East 21st Street. The 13th Precinct and neighboring 17th Precinct ranked 57th safest out of 69 patrol areas for per-capita crime in 2010. The high per-capita crime rate is attributed to the precincts' high number of property crimes.

The 13th Precinct has a lower crime rate than in the 1990s, with crimes across all categories having decreased by 80.7% between 1990 and 2018. The precinct reported 2 murders, 18 rapes, 152 robberies, 174 felony assaults, 195 burglaries, 1,376 grand larcenies, and 37 grand larcenies auto in 2018.

== Fire safety and hospitals ==
Gramercy is served by two New York City Fire Department (FDNY) fire stations. Engine Company 5 is located at 340 East 14th Street while Engine Company 14 is located at 14 East 18th Street.

Nearby is the Hospital for Joint Diseases, part of the NYU Medical Center, and the New York Eye and Ear Infirmary on 14th Street. Cabrini Medical Center, on East 19th and 20th Streets, closed down in 2008, but the buildings were purchased by Memorial Sloan-Kettering Cancer Center in 2010, for use as a cancer outpatient facility. In addition, Beth Israel Medical Center in Stuyvesant Town operated until 2025.

== Post office and ZIP Codes ==
Gramercy is located in two ZIP Codes. The area south of 20th Street is located in 10003, while the area north of 20th Street is located in 10010. The United States Postal Service operates the Madison Square Station post office at 149 East 23rd Street.

== Notable residents ==
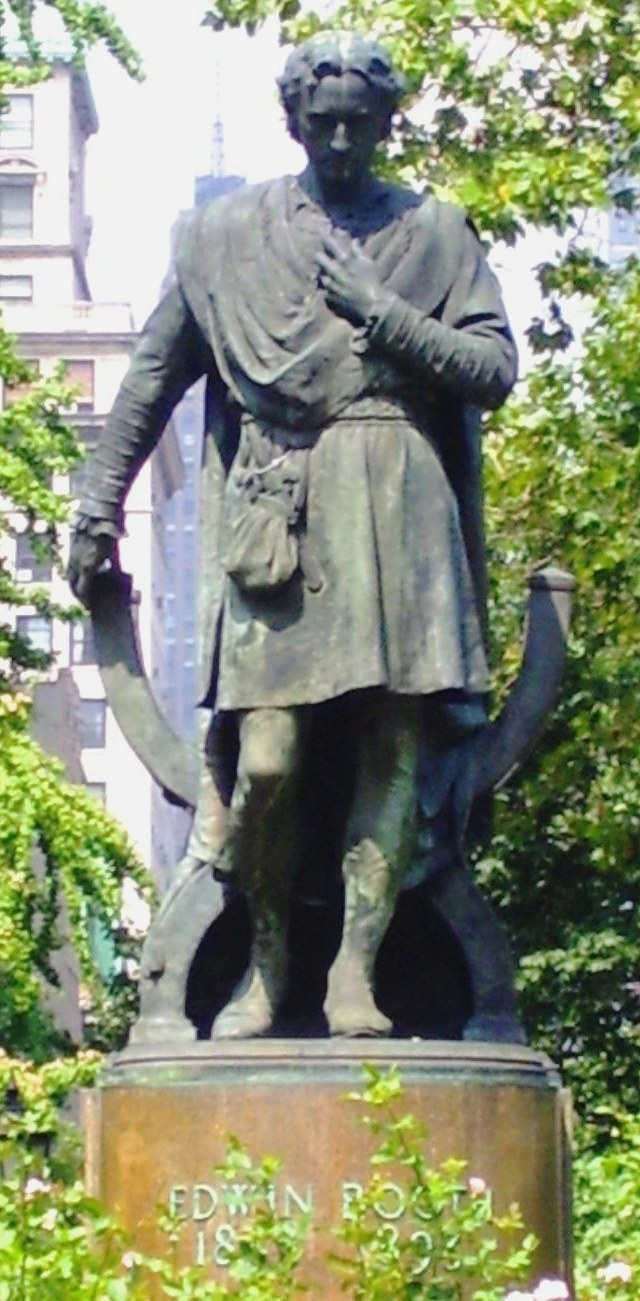
Edwin Booth as Hamlet, by Edmond T. Quinn, was placed at the center of the park by The Players in 1916.

Inside the park

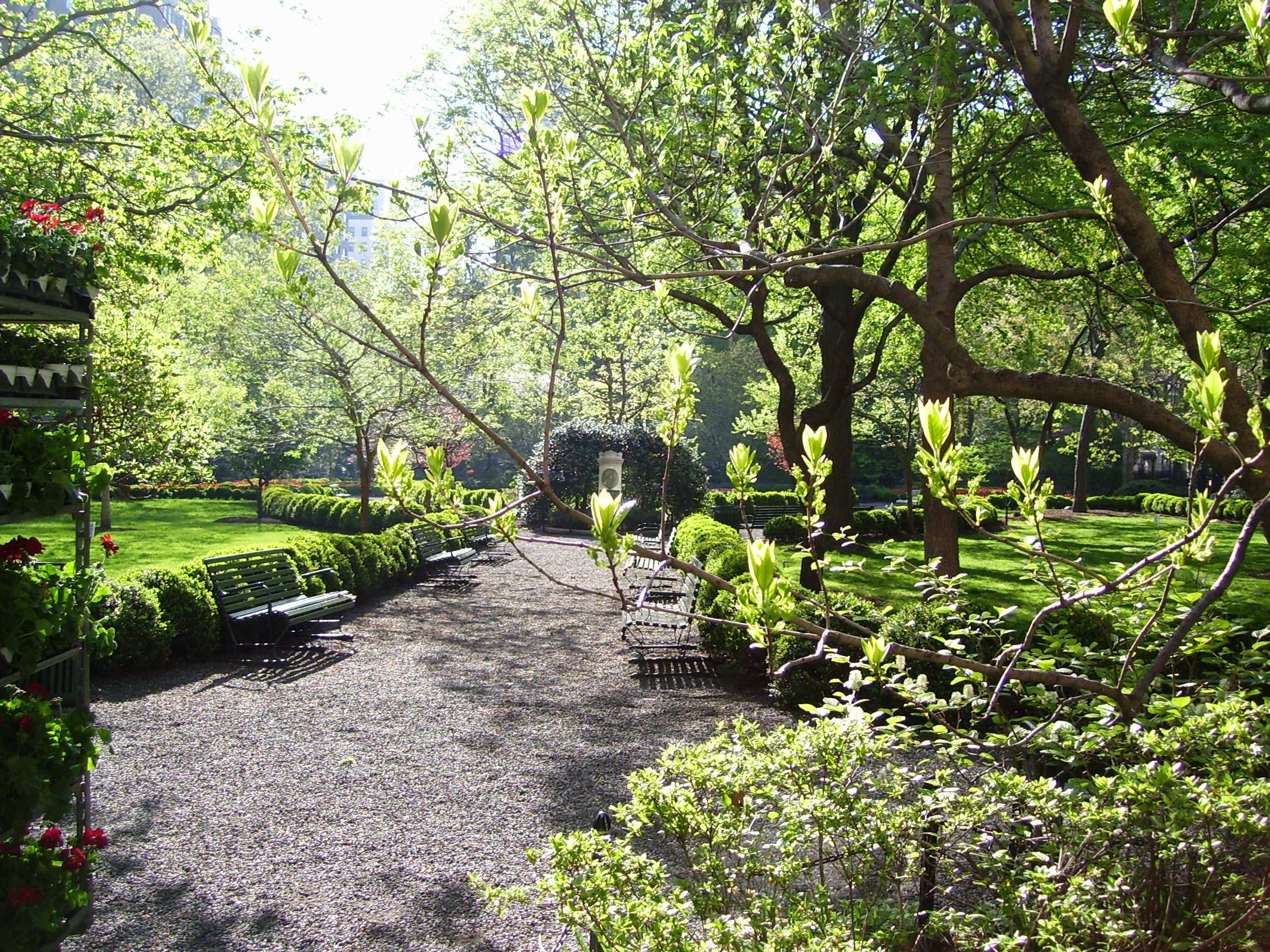
From the west gate

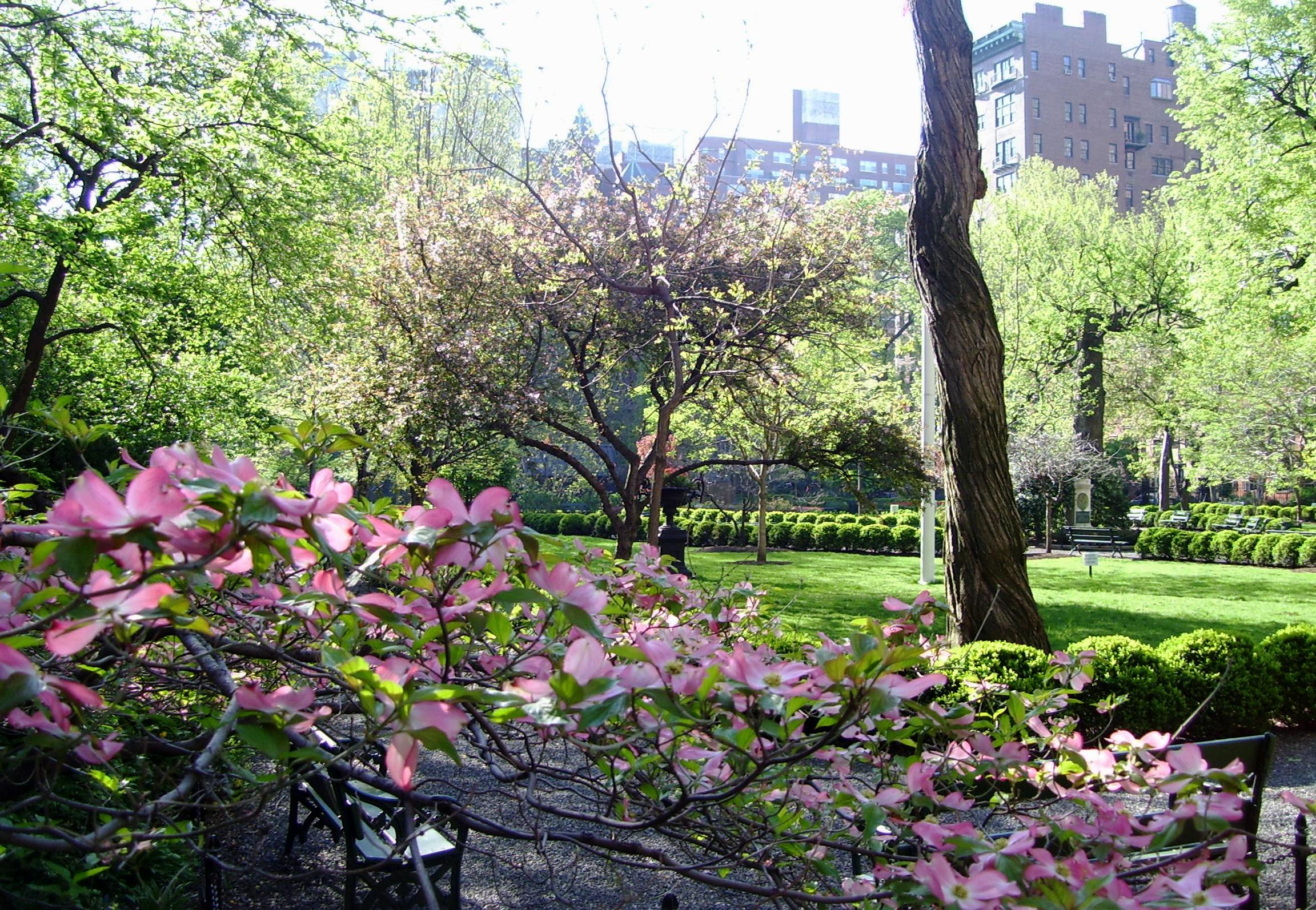
From the northwest corner

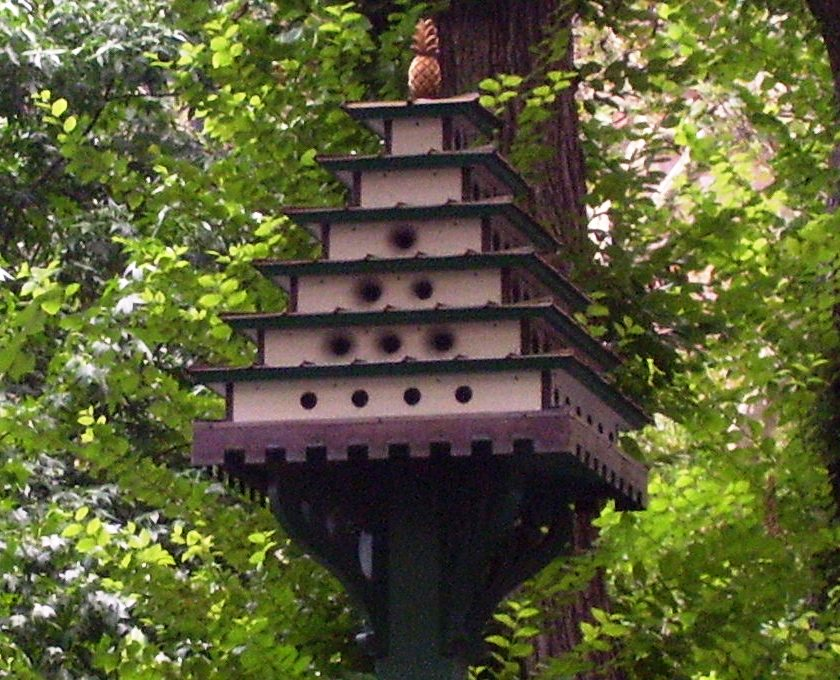
One of the birdhouses in the park

=== Around the park (listed in order of address number) ===
- No. 1 – Amos Pinchot – brother of former Governor of Pennsylvania
- No. 1 – Valentine Mott – an original resident, chief medical officer of the Union Army and founder of Bellevue Hospital and NYU Medical School
- No. 2 – James W. Pinchot – businessman and father of Gifford Pinchot, who was the first chief of the U.S. Forest Service
- No. 3&4 – James Harper – 1847–1869, Mayor of New York from 1844 to 1845 and one of the founders of the Harper publishing firm; the two iron lamps outside No. 4 were placed there by the city in Harper's honor: the custom was that mayor's residences were so distinguished so that he would be available for nighttime emergencies
- No. 5 – Vincent Astor – businessman, philanthropist, member of the Astor family
- No. 7 – Julia Roberts – American actress
- No. 10 – Henrietta B. Haines – novelist
- No. 11 – Robert Henri – American painter
- No. 11 – Samuel L. M. Barlow II – composer, patron of the arts
- No. 15 – Samuel J. Tilden – whose house, a National Historic Landmark, is now the National Arts Club
- No. 16 – Edwin Booth – famed Shakespearean actor, founded The Players
- No. 19 – Stuyvesant Fish – a leader of New York society (1887)
- No. 19 – Edward Sheldon – playwright
- No. 19 – William C. Bullitt – diplomat, journalist and novelist
- No. 19 – Benjamin Sonnenberg – publicist
- No. 19 – Richard Tyler – designer
- No. 19 – Henry Jarecki – entrepreneur
- No. 24 – Richard Watson Gilder – the poet and editor died in this house
- No. 24 – Thomas Alva Edison – inventor
- No. 24 – Albert Gallatin – Secretary of the Treasury
- No. 26 – Booth Tarkington – novelist and dramatist
- No. 26 – Steinway family – manufacturers of Steinway pianos
- No. 34 – James Cagney, Margaret Hamilton, and Gregory Peck
- No. 36 – John Barrymore – star of stage and screen
- No. 36 – Daniel Chester French – sculptor responsible for the seated figure of Lincoln at the Lincoln Memorial in Washington, D.C.
- No. 36 – Alfred Ringling – founder of the Ringling Brothers Circus
- No. 38 – John Steinbeck – author
- No. 44 – Hart Crane – poet
- Where the Gramercy Park Hotel and the connected 50 Gramercy Park North co-op are now located:
  - Stanford White – architect
  - Robert G. Ingersoll – orator
- Elsewhere around the park:
  - Frances Bavier – stage and television actress, Aunt Bee on The Andy Griffith Show
  - John Bigelow – lawyer and statesman, who lived at 21 Gramercy Park
  - Vincent D'Onofrio- actor, producer, director, and singer
  - Jimmy Fallon – host of The Tonight Show Starring Jimmy Fallon
  - Henry Herbert – English actor and producer
  - Robert H. Ingersoll – businessman
  - Karl Lagerfeld – fashion designer
  - Maud Powell – female concert violinist and suffrage pioneer who cast her first ballot in 1919
  - George Templeton Strong – lawyer and diarist, an original resident, who lived at 55 Gramercy Park North
  - Uma Thurman – actress
  - Rufus Wainwright – musician

=== Around the neighborhood ===
- John Avlon and Margaret Hoover, newscasters
- Peter Cooper – industrialist, entrepreneur and philanthropist, lived just north of the park at 9 Lexington Avenue.
- Joseph P. Day (1874–1944), real estate broker and developer and auctioneer
- Theodore Roosevelt's birthplace on 20th Street is a National Historic Site.
- Edith Wharton – author, born at 14 West 23rd Street and attended Calvary Church
- Oscar Wilde took rooms at 47 Irving Place for a while in 1882, some ten years before his future literary agent in America, Elisabeth Marbury set up home next door at 49 Irving Place with interior designer Elsie de Wolfe. De Wolfe and Marbury were said to be the most fashionable lesbian couple of Victorian New York.
- Antonín Dvořák lived at 327 East 17th Street from 1892-95.
- Chelsea Clinton, the daughter of U.S. President Bill Clinton and First Lady Hillary Clinton, as well as her husband Marc Mezvinsky, used to live in the neighborhood before moving to nearby NoMad, selling their apartment for $4 million.
- Noah Baumbach - American filmmaker.

Many actors, actresses and artists live in the district including Kate Hudson, Whitney Port, Joshua Bell, Jimmy Fallon and Amanda Lepore. Amanda Peet grew up in the neighborhood. Winona Ryder once resided in Gramercy Park, but sold her co-operative apartment in 2008. The fashion designer Narciso Rodriguez has his studio on Irving Place and the neighborhood is home to numerous models' apartments from nearby agencies on Broadway. Ann Curry, an anchor for NBC News, also lives in the neighborhood. Actor Jim Parsons also maintains a residence there.

== In popular culture ==
Literature:

Year	Title	Author	Description	Ref.
1892	Gramercy Park: A Story of New York	John Seymour Wood	may be one of the first literary works set in the area	
1945	Stuart Little	E. B. White	The Little family live at "22 Gramercy Park". White describes as "[A] pleasant place near a park."	
1930	Gramercy Park	E.B. White	A poem which was published in The New Yorker, about him and a friend climbing over the fence into the park.	
1949	The Family on Gramercy Park	Henry Noble MacCracken's	Set in the neighborhood.	
1961	Medusa in Gramercy Park	Horace Gregory	A book of poems	
1963	It's Like This, Cat	Emily Cheney Neville	The Newbery award winning children's book set in Gramercy Park.	
1965	90 Gramercy Park	Priscilla Dalton	The address in the title of does not actually exist.	
1970	Time and Again	Jack Finney	A character in lives in 19 Gramercy Park South around 1882.	
1982	The Brownstone House of Nero Wolfe	Ken Darby	It's stated that Nero Wolfe's townhouse was actually on East 22nd Street in the Gramercy Park district rather than the fictional West 35th street address(es) given in the novels to protect Wolfe's privacy.	
1983	The Pirate of Gramercy Park	Bruce Nicolaysen	Part of the Novel of New York multi-generation family historical fiction series.	
1988	Changes for Samantha	Valerie Tripp	Part of the American Girl series, Samantha stays at her Uncle and Aunt's brownstone house in Gramercy Park.	
1996	A Dance Through Time	Lynn Kurland	The heroine Elizabeth Smith falls asleep on a bench in 1996's Gramercy Park only to wake up in 1311 Scotland	
2001	Murder on Gramercy Park	Victoria Thompson	The mystery novel is part of the Gaslight Mystery series	
2003	Gramercy Park	Paula Cohen	A historical novel is set in 1894.	
2005	The Monsters of Gramercy Park	Danny Leigh	A psychological thriller	
2006	The Interpretation of Murder	Jed Rubenfeld	Several key scenes take place in the park nearby one of the book's main protagonists.	
2007	The Luxe	Anna Godbersen	The book takes place in the neighborhood around Gramercy Park.	
2010	Assholes Finish First	Tucker Max	In his memoir he recounts that he gained access to Gramercy Park to win a bet with a female acquaintance.	
2010	Big Girl	Danielle Steel	Writes about Gramercy Park in her novel	
2024	Wrath of the Triple Goddess	Rick Riordan	Writes about Gramercy Park in his novel- the home of Hecate is located there	

Films:

- Note: Gramercy Park is a private park, and film companies are not usually allowed to shoot there.

Year	Title	Director	Description	Ref.
1935	Barbary Coast	Howard Hawks	The character Jim Carmichael, played by Joel McCrea, is said to live at 14 Gramercy Park, although currently residing in San Francisco, while the protagonist Mary Rutledge (Miriam Hopkins) played in the park as a child.	
1973	Soylent Green	Richard Fleischer	In the science fiction film which is set in New York in 2022, a corrupt New York governor escorts some children into a tent, saying, "This was once called Gramercy Park, boys. Now it's the only tree sanctuary in New York."	
1979	Manhattan	Woody Allen	Allen's character Isaac Davis is seen running through the streets in NYC and Gramercy Park.	
1979	The Warriors	Walter Hill	one of the fictional gangs featured is the Gramercy Riffs, the biggest gang in New York.	
1993	Manhattan Murder Mystery	Woody Allen	The exterior of the park can be seen with the characters commenting on the beauty of the park leaving National Arts Club. Later in the film Diane Keaton and Alan Alda walk into the street directly in front of the park as they try to track a bus route.	
1999	Notting Hill	Roger Michell	In the film a famous actress, played by Julia Roberts, is shown starring in a film called Gramercy Park, which was also the name of the production company for Notting Hill.	
2014	That Awkward Moment	Tom Gormican	In the film a couple, played by Zac Efron and Imogen Poots, steal a key to the park while being shown a house in Gramercy Park.	

Television:

Year	Title	Network	Description	Ref.
1994	Gargoyles	ABC	In the animated series the villainous Demona resides in a townhouse located in Gramercy Park.	
2005	Law & Order	NBC	In the episode, "Dining Out", the body of the murder victim is found in Gramercy Park.	
2013–2014	Girls	HBO	Hannah (Lena Dunham) and Shoshana (Zosia Mamet) walk around Gramercy.	
2017	Broad City	Comedy Central	In the fourth season of the TV series, Abbi and Ilana save a man who is choking by doing the Heimlich maneuver through the park gate, but he still refuses to let them into the park.	
2019	Dimension 20	CollegeHumor	In the season The Unsleeping City, The Gramercy Occult Society is based near the park.	
2022	Uncoupled	Netflix	The main character, Michael (Neil Patrick Harris), lives at 44 Gramercy Park North.	
2022	WeCrashed	Apple TV+	Anne Hathaway and Jared Leto portraying Rebekah Neumann and Adam Neumann buy an apartment in Gramercy Park.	
2022	The Marvelous Mrs. Maisel	Amazon Prime	Midge (Rachel Brosnahan) to meet Joel's parents at the National Arts Club.	
2023–2024	And Just Like That...	HBO Max	Carrie Bradshaw sells her former apartment and moves into one in Gramercy Park on Gramercy Park West at the end of Season 2.	

Music:

- 1969: American guitarist/songwriter Stefan Grossman released an album called The Gramercy Park Sheik
- 1985: Charly Garcia and Pedro Aznar's album Tango contains a track titled "Gramercy Park Hotel".
- 1989: American jazz-funk/soul-jazz saxophonist Grover Washington, Jr.'s album Time Out of Mind contains a track titled "Gramercy Park".
- 1997: Australian singer-songwriter Ben Lee released a song titled "Grammercy (sic) Park Hotel" on his album Something to Remember Me By.
- 2000: Jazz fusion/rock duo Steely Dan mentioned the park in "Janie Runaway", from its album Two Against Nature in the lyrics "Down in Tampa the future looked desperate and dark / Now you're the wonder waif of Gramercy Park".
- 2001: Dutch jazz pianist Michiel Borstlap owns a record label called "Gramercy Park" and he also composed a tune with the same name.
- 2002: Electronic rock band Deadsy released a song entitled "The Key to Gramercy Park" on their album Commencement.
- 2013: American guitarist Steve Hunter's album The Manhattan Blues Project contains a track titled "Gramercy Park".
- 2015: Indie rock band Milo Green album Control contains a track titled "Gramercy".
- 2020: American singer-songwriter Alicia Keys's album Alicia contains a song titled "Gramercy Park".

Stage:

- 1994–99: Toni Ann Johnson's play Gramercy Park is Closed to the Public – which centers on the life of an upper middle class woman of mixed race and her romantic relationship with a white policeman – was produced in the summer of 1994 by The Fountainhead Theatre Company in Los Angeles at The Hudson Theatre. It was also produced by the New York Stage and Film Company in Summer 1999 at Vassar College in Poughkeepsie, New York.

== Gallery ==
Around the Park

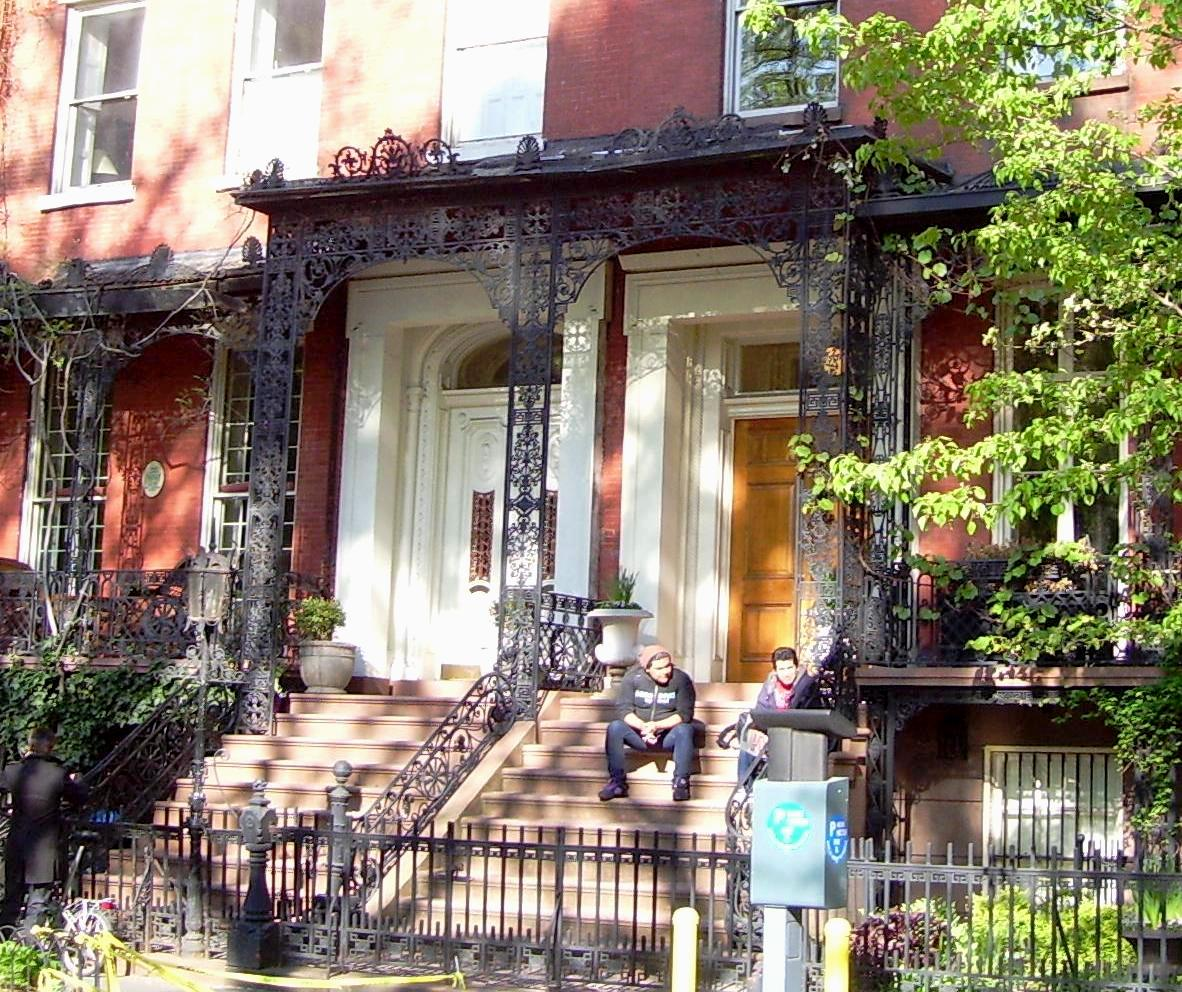
#3 & 4: Doorways of the Greek Revival townhouses, design attributed to Alexander Jackson Davis, "one of America's most versatile 19th century architects"

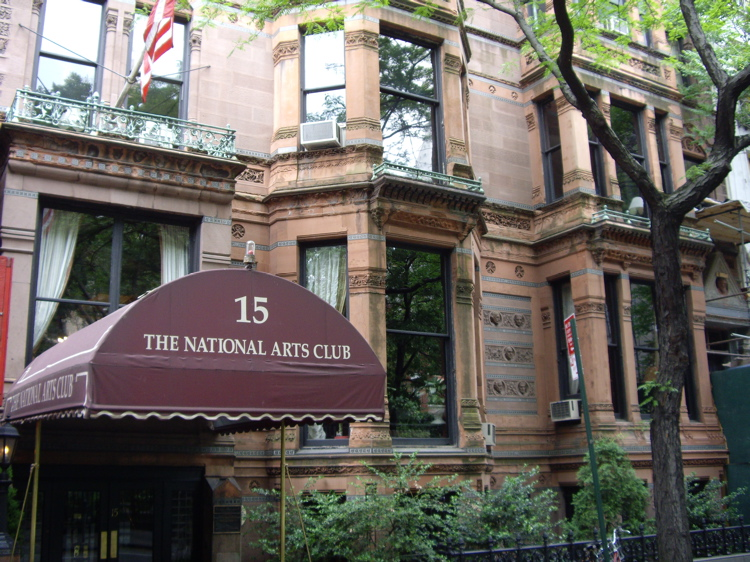
#15: The National Arts Club, former home of Samuel J. Tilden, remodeled for Tilden by Calvert Vaux

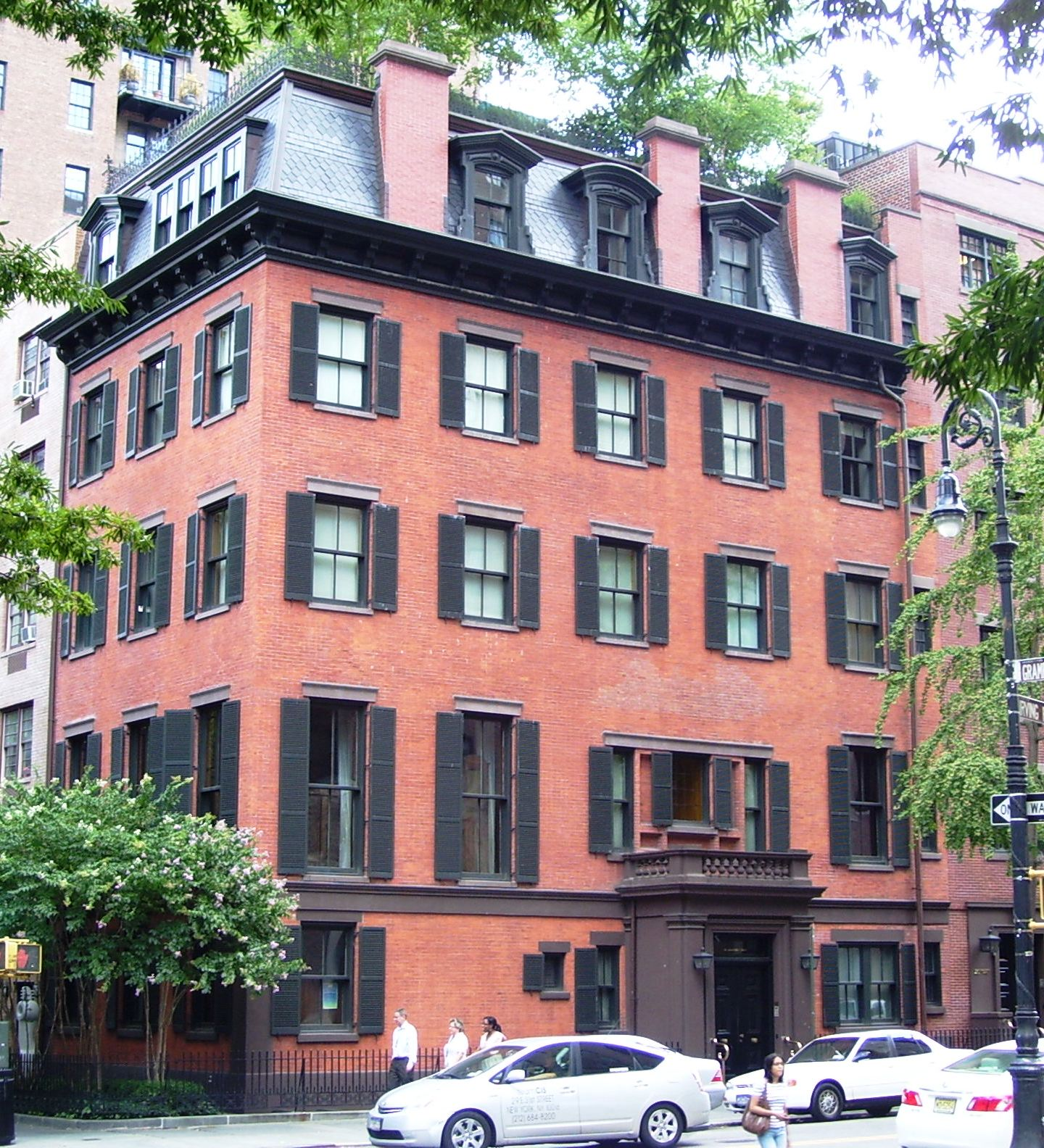
#19, built in 1845 and remodeled in 1887 for Stuyvesant Fish. John Barrymore lived here while working on Broadway.

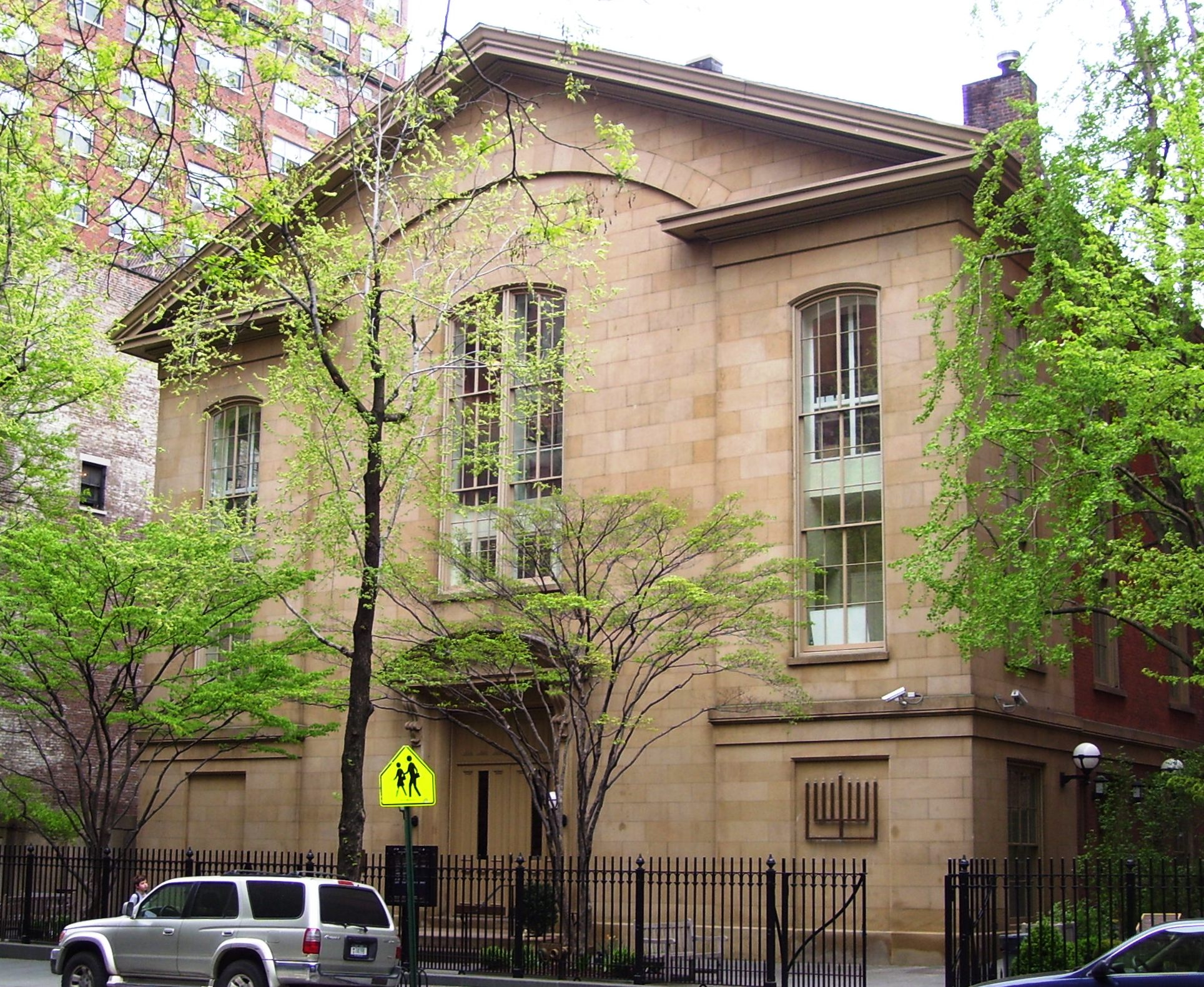
#28: The Brotherhood Synagogue was a stop on the Underground Railroad when it was a Quaker meeting house The Travelers' Aid Society grew out of one of the congregation's activities.

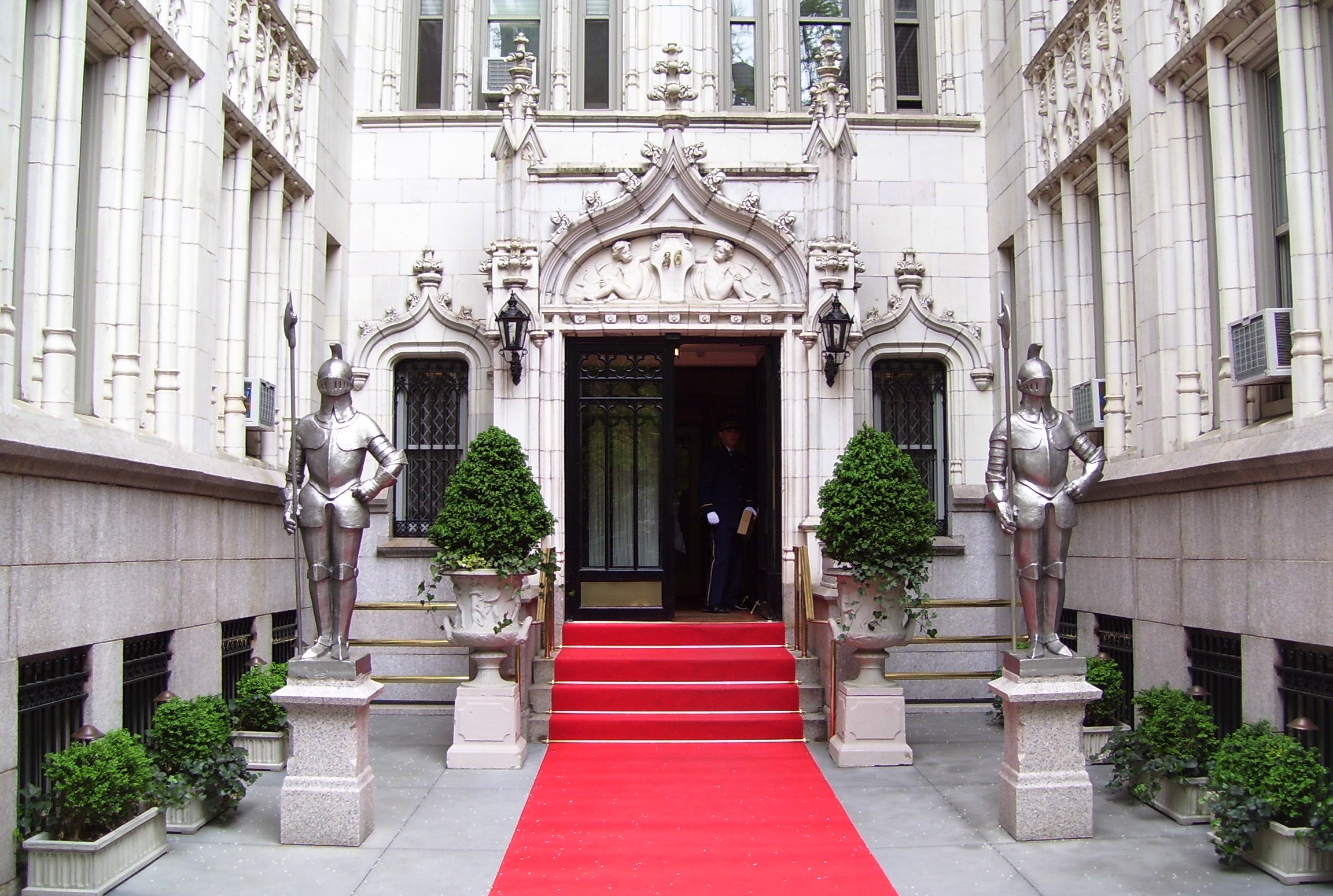
#36: An early apartment building (1905), it was once called the "Gramercy Clubhouse". Designed by James Riley Gordon.
Around the neighborhood

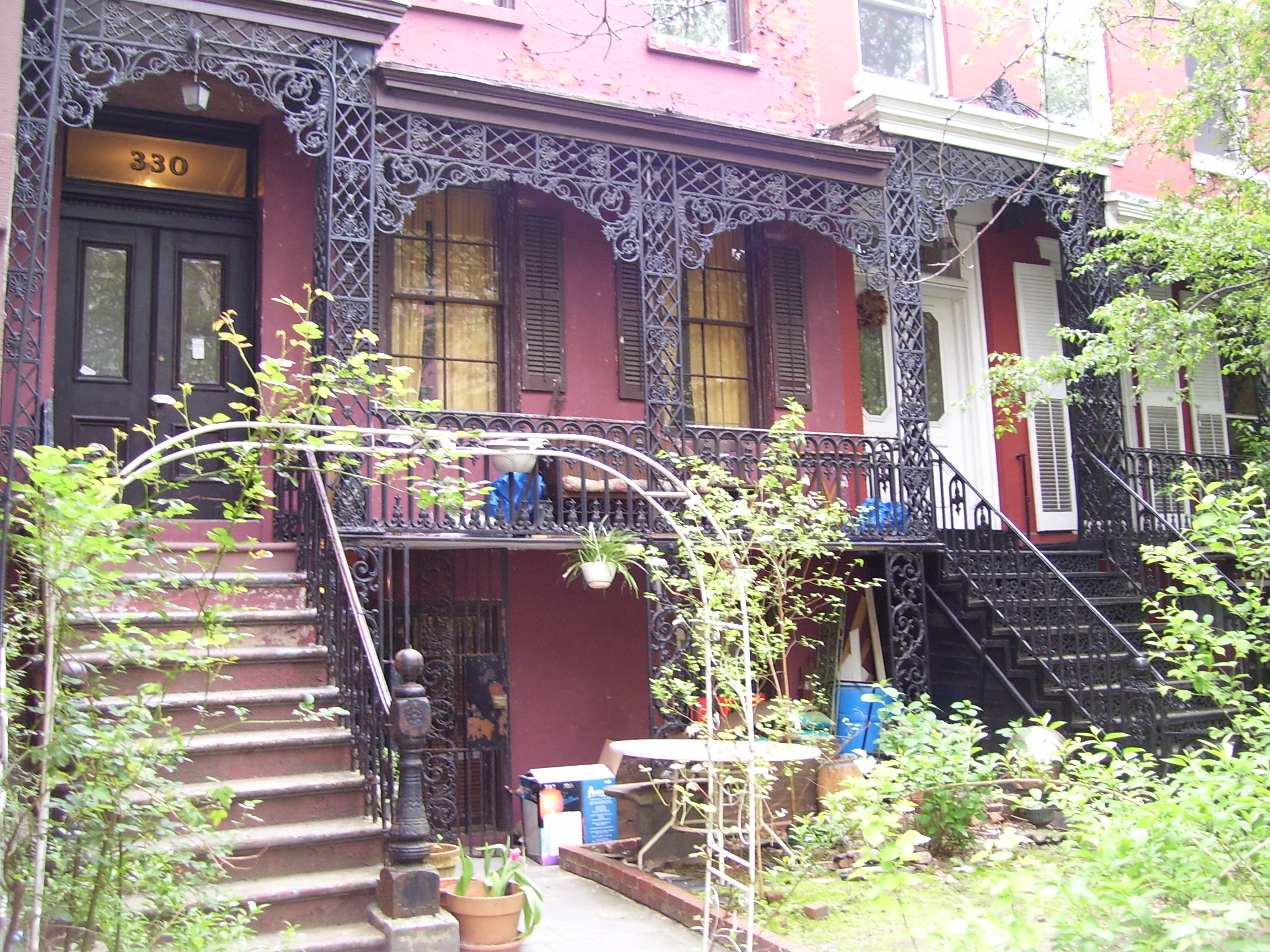
Italianate townhouses on East 18th Street (1853), with cast-iron verandas reminiscent of the French Quarter of New Orleans.

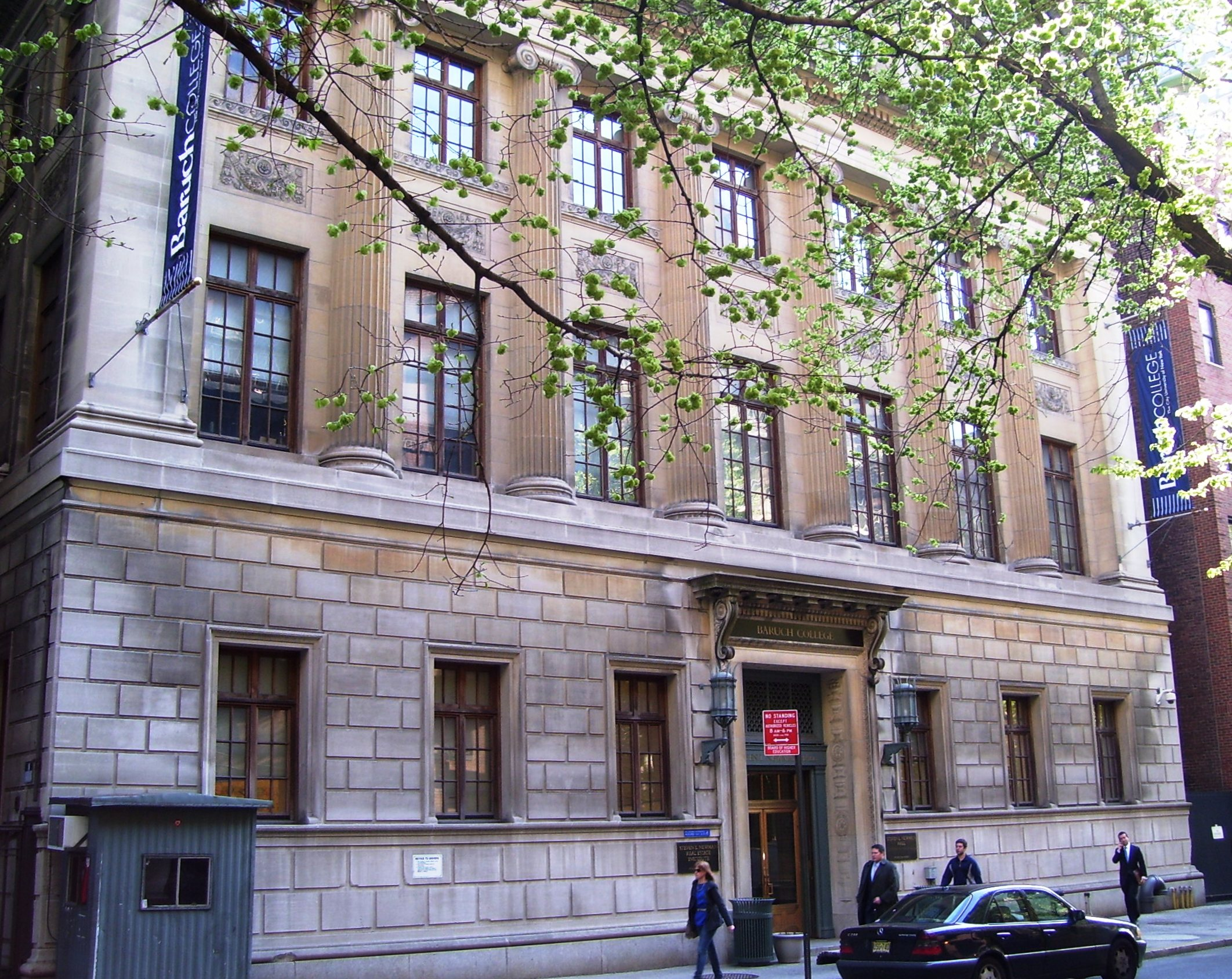
The former Children's Court, now part of Baruch College of CUNY

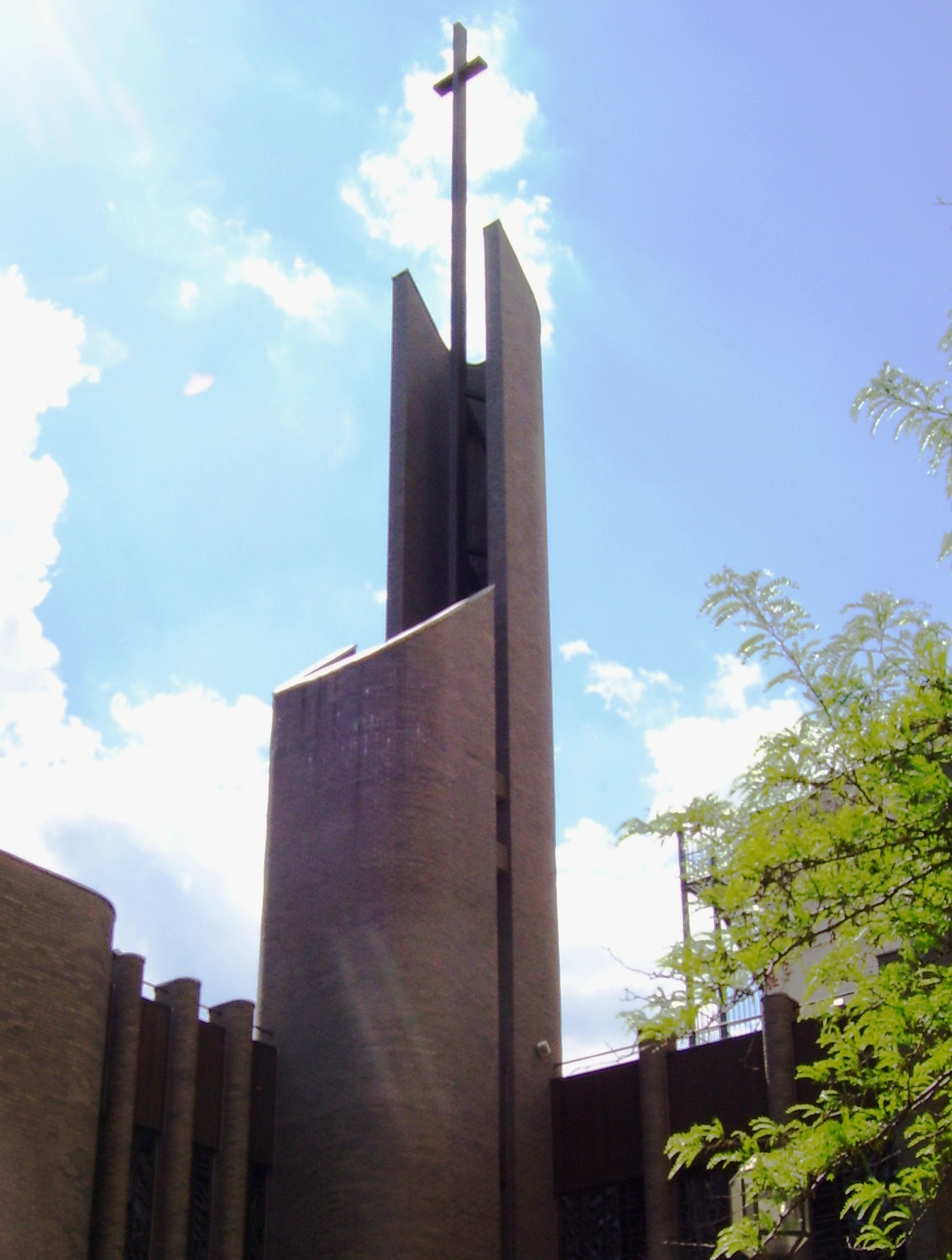
Steeple of Epiphany Roman Catholic Church, "The most positive modernist religious statement on Manhattan Island to date."

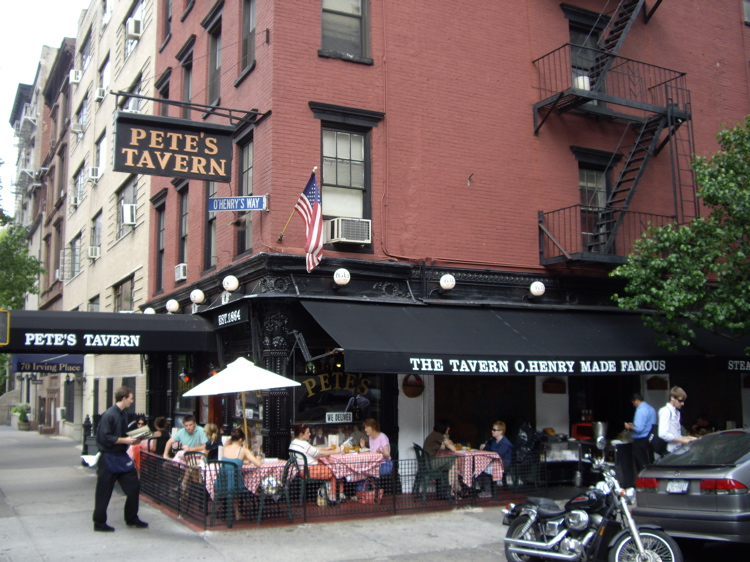
Pete's Tavern, where urban legend has it that O. Henry wrote "The Gift of the Magi", was formerly the Portman Hotel.

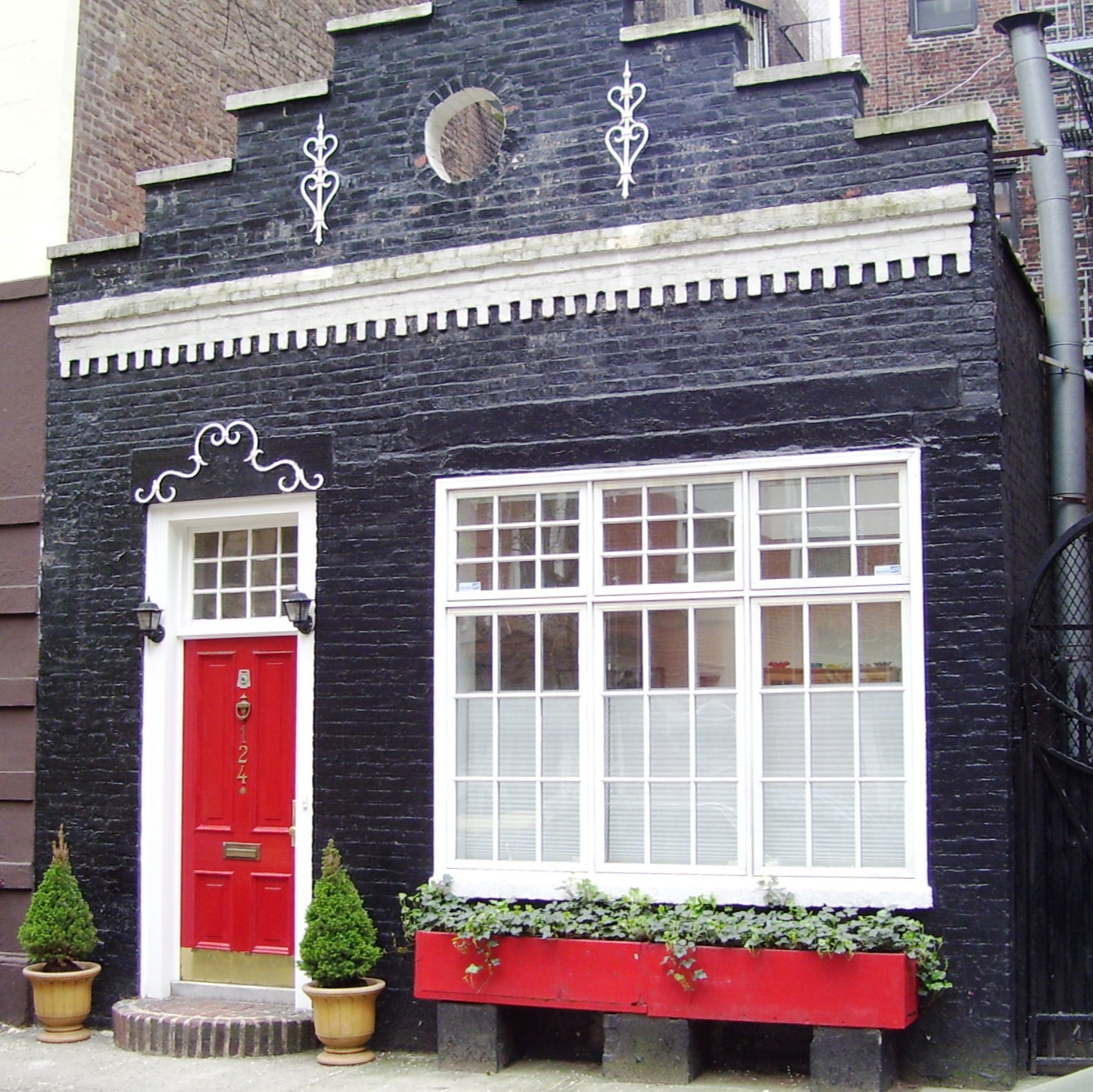
A converted carriage house on East 19th Street between Irving Place and Third Avenue, a block often referred to as "Block Beautiful"

== See also ==
- List of neighborhoods in Manhattan
