= Manhattan Trade School for Girls =

Former public school in New York City

Coordinates: 40.7391°N 73.9853°W

The Manhattan Trade School for Girls was a public high school in New York City. Founded in 1902 by Mary Schenck Woolman, it was the first vocational school for female students established in the United States. It was established by philanthropic reformers to provide training for young women to work in trades such as garment factory work. It was originally located on West 14th Street, but was moved to East 23rd Street in 1906–1907. To accommodate growing enrollment, a new building was constructed and designed by C. B. J. Snyder in 1915 at 127 East 22nd Street. The building now houses The School of the Future, a New York City public middle school and high school.

== Gallery ==
The following photographs of activities at the Manhattan Trade School for Girls date to 1916:

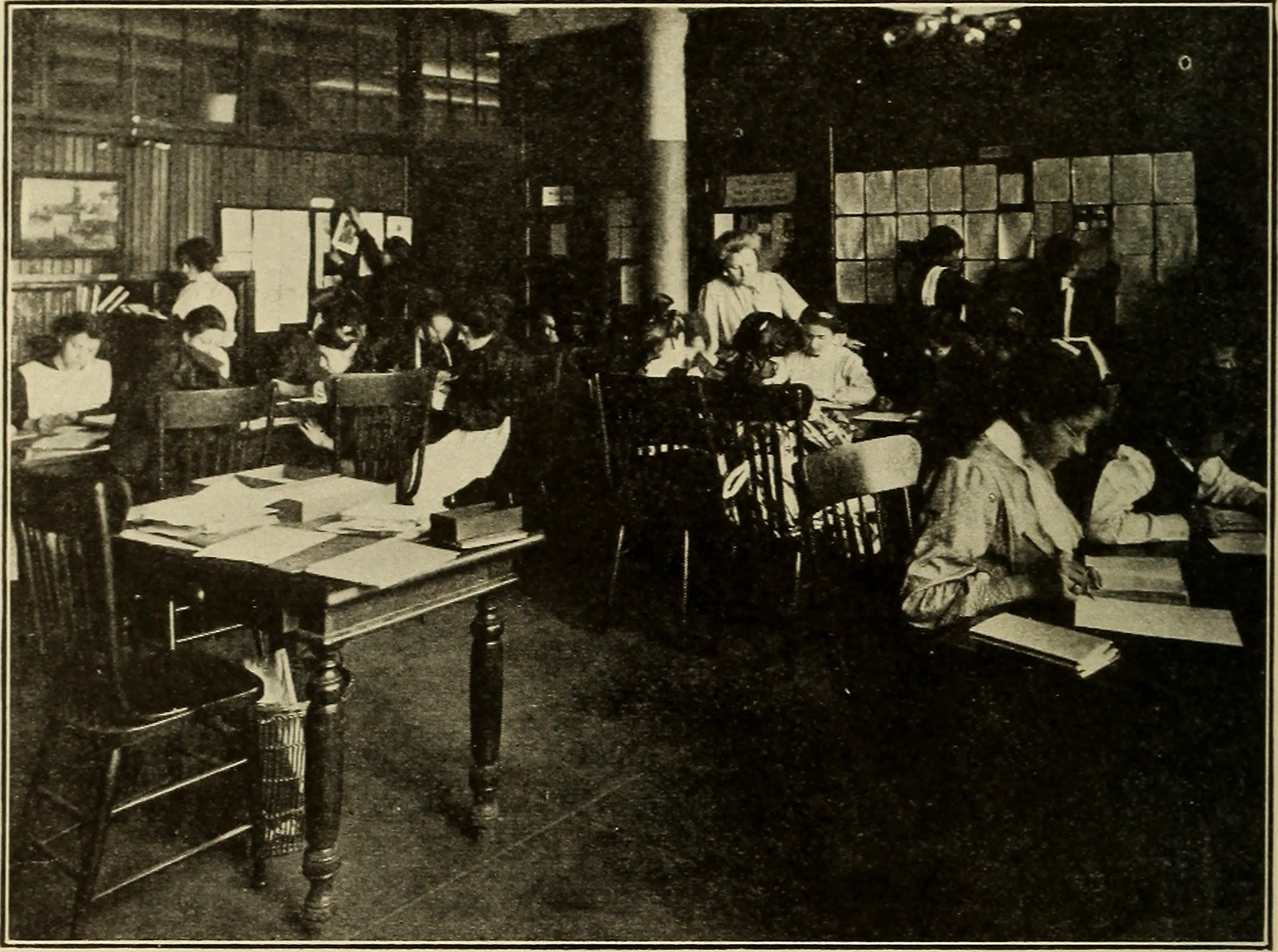
Academic class

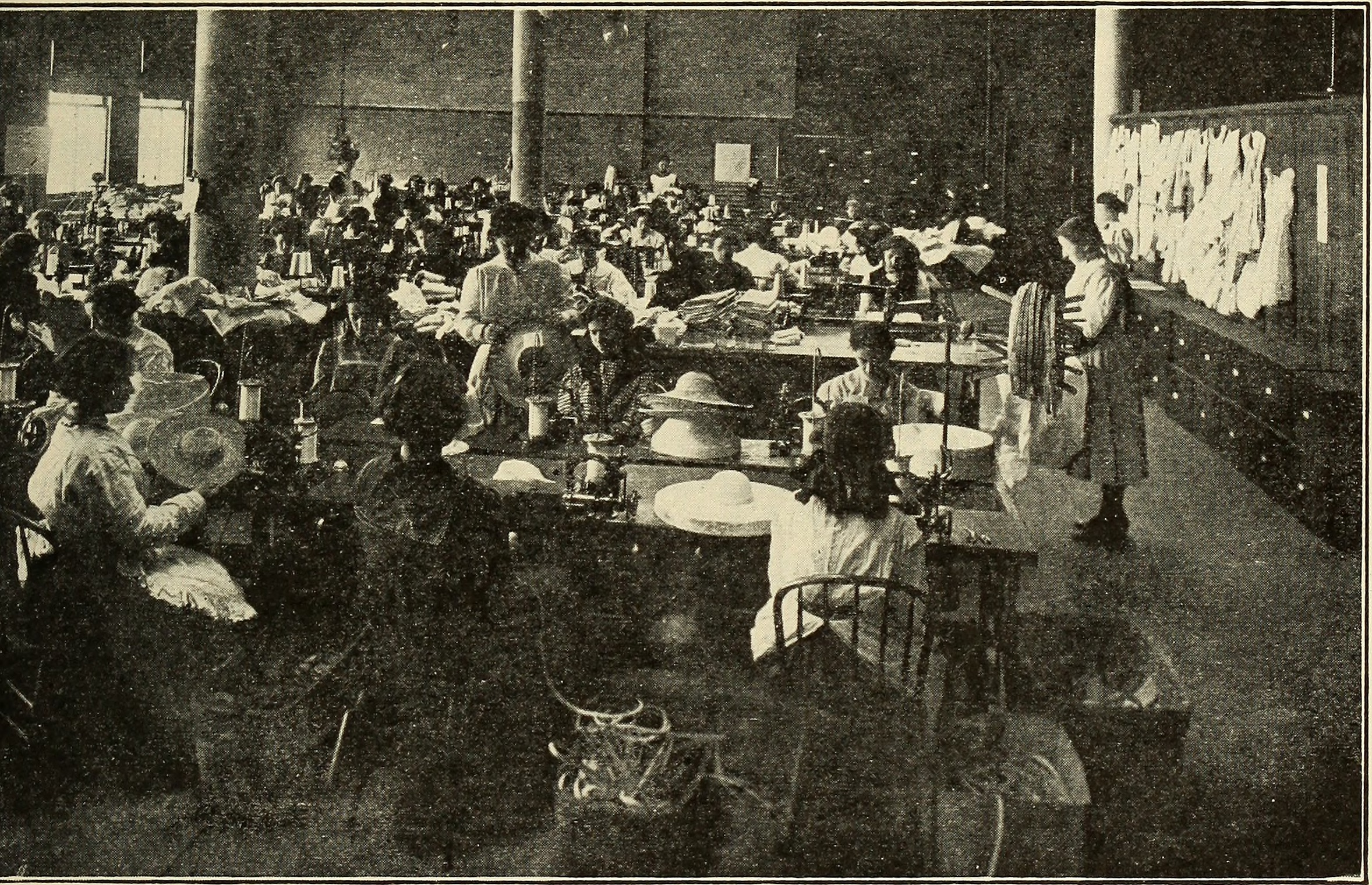
Operating department

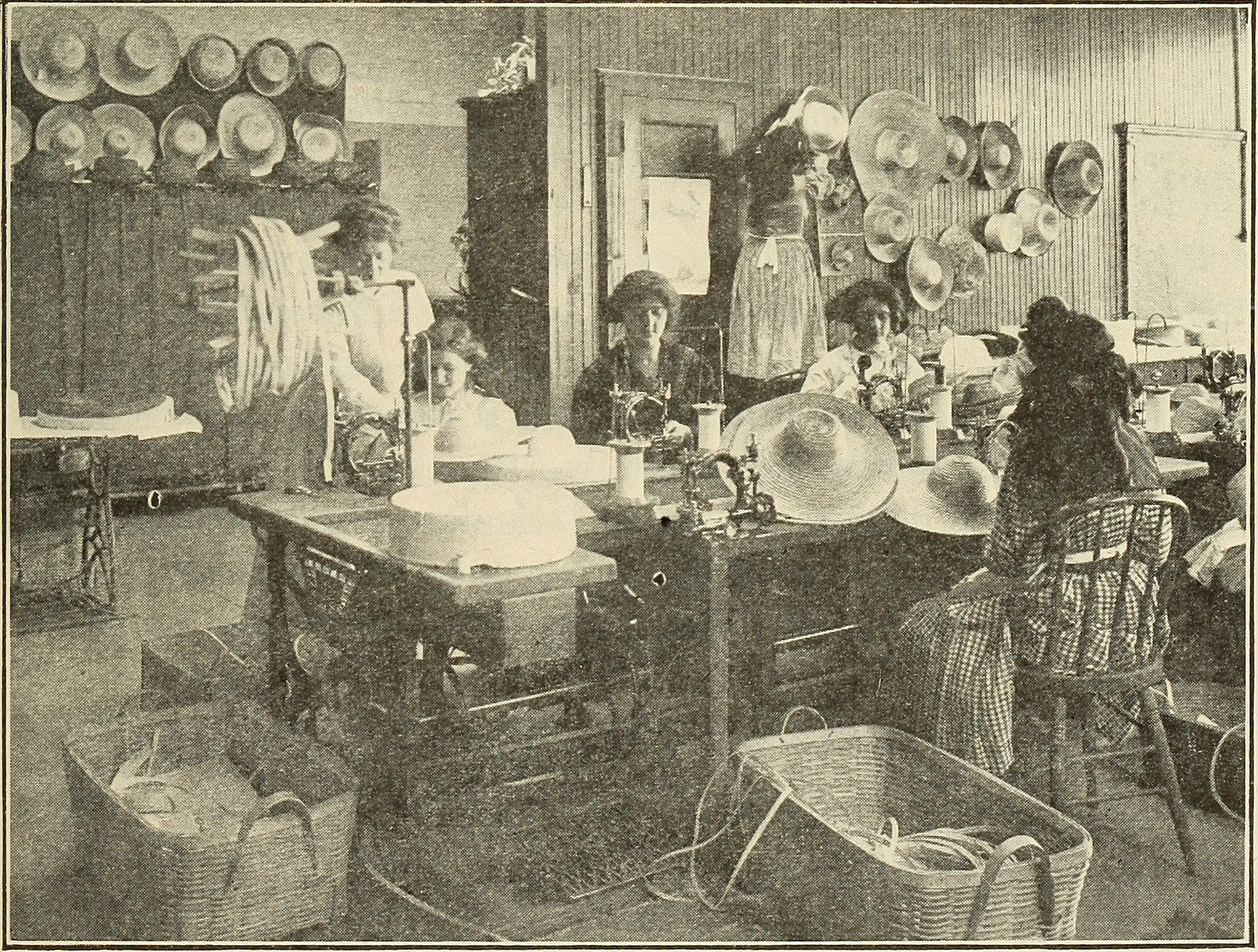
Straw sewing

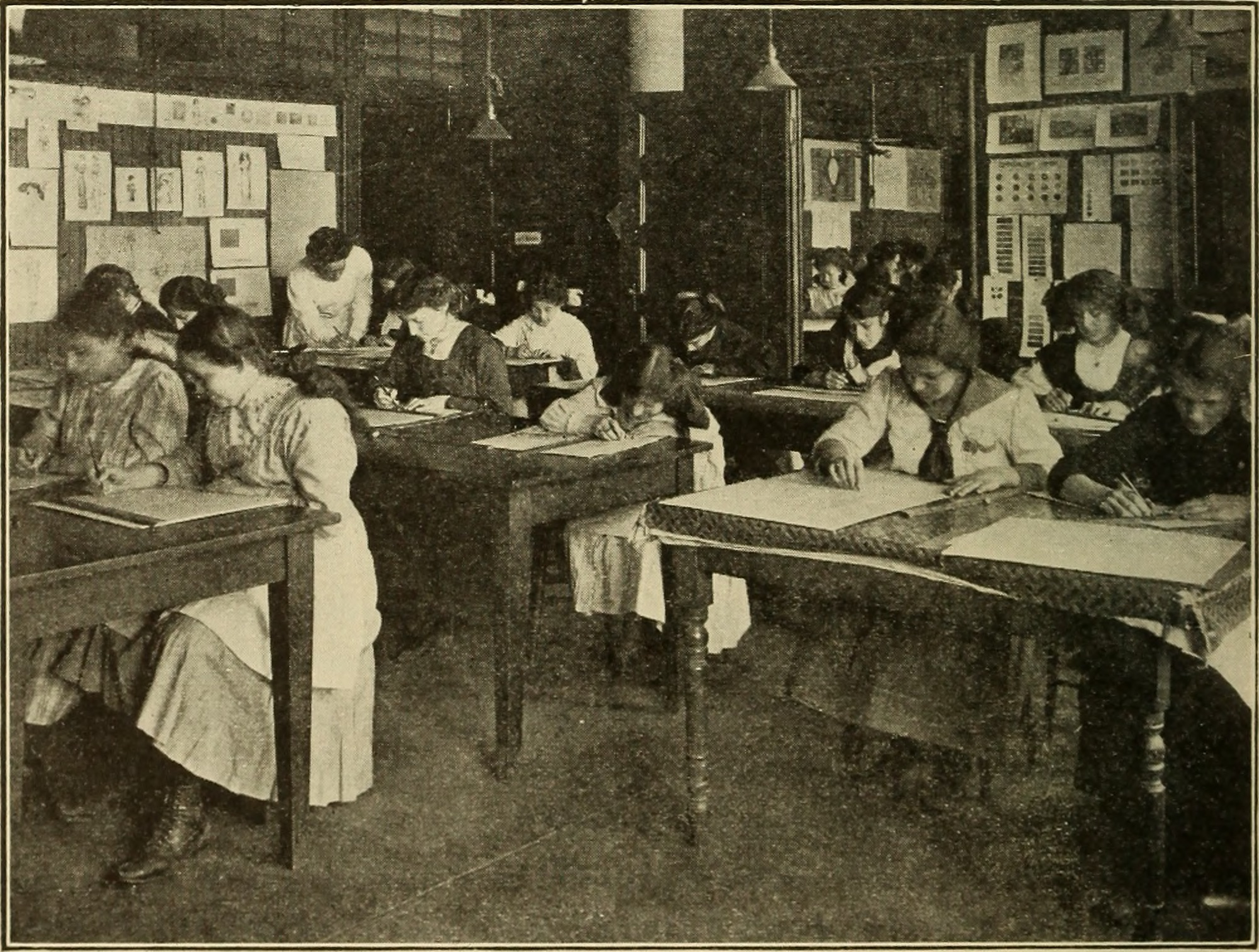
Art room

== Documentary ==
A documentary film was made about the school in 1911. The film is available on DVD from Image Entertainment as part of the box set Treasures III: Social Issues in American Film, 1900–1934 with a ragtime style musical score by Elena Ruehr composed specifically for the film.
