= Mary Schenck Woolman =

American educator and author (1860–1940)

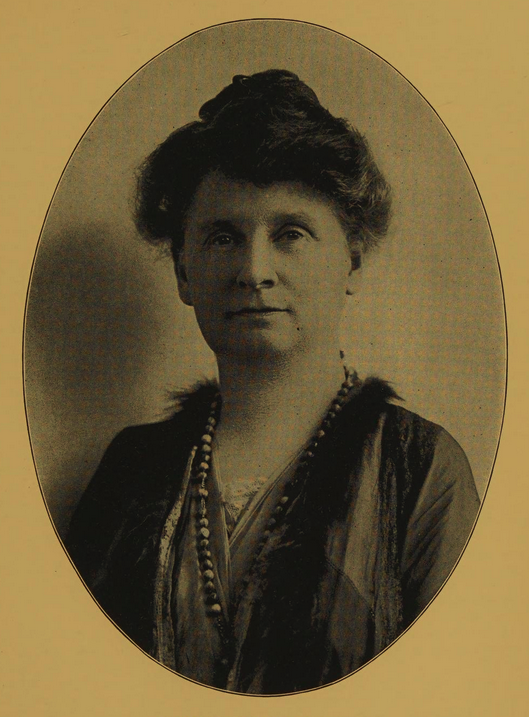
- Born: Mary Raphael Schenck; April 26, 1860; Camden, New Jersey, US
- Died: August 1, 1940 (aged 80); Newton Highlands, Massachusetts, US
- Occupation: Educator
- Years active: 1892–1935
- Known for: Vocational and consumer education for women
- Spouse: Franklin Conrad Woolman (m. 1883; died 1906)
- Relatives: Ferdinand Schureman Schenck (grandfather); Franklin D'Olier (nephew)

Mary Raphael Schenck Woolman (April 26, 1860 – August 1, 1940) was an American educator known for her advocacy of vocational education and consumer education, particularly for women. She was one of the first woman faculty members at Teachers College in New York City. She was the founder of Manhattan Trade School for Girls, the first vocational school for women in the United States. She was the author of several books and lectured around the country.

== Early life ==
Mary Raphael Schenck was born in Camden, New Jersey, on April 26, 1860. She was the daughter of John Vorhees Schenck and Martha (née McKeen) Schenck. Her father was a prominent physician who was once president of the Medical Society of New Jersey. Her grandfather, Ferdinand Schureman Schenck, was also a physician and represented New Jersey in Congress.

She was educated at the Quaker Mary Anna Longstreth School in Philadelphia. She attended the University of Pennsylvania from 1883 to 1884, before the school granted degrees to women.

She married Franklin Conrad Woolman on October 18, 1883. He was an attorney who served one term in the New Jersey Legislature in 1890. Her husband was also a member of a prominent family in New Jersey and in Philadelphia, tracing their lineage back to the Quaker preacher John Woolman. Franklin D'Olier was their nephew.

== Move to New York ==
Woolman's father died in 1882 at age 58 from typhoid fever. This event, followed by serious illnesses for her mother and husband, forced Woolman to become both household manager and family health care provider. Having to learn additional skills such as cooking, care for invalids and budgeting impressed upon her the inadequacies of the training in practical matters provided to women at the time.

To avoid bankruptcy, she was forced to sell their house in Camden and move the family to New York City in 1891. There she was employed as a copy editor, and the family stayed in a boarding house on Washington Square.

Several faculty members of the Teachers College also lived in the boarding house, and one of them brought her a book on the teaching of sewing to review. She had harsh criticism of the book, which impressed the professor and the president of the Teachers College. They asked her to write up her own ideas on the subject. The manual she wrote de-emphasized then-current methods of teaching, involving fancy stitch work and repetition. Instead, she focused on the planning and making of practical garments. Her manual was well received.

== Career ==
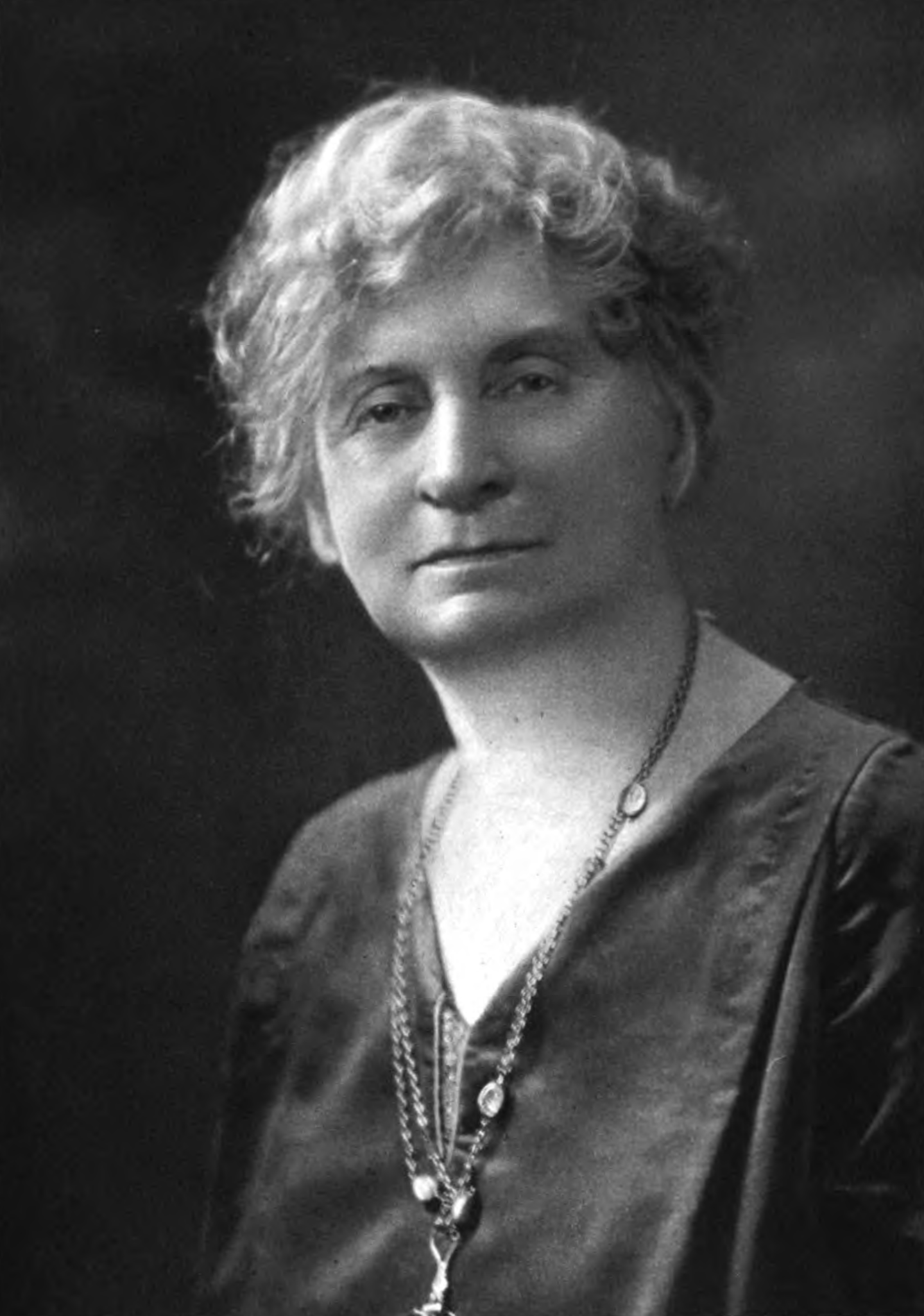
(undated)

The success of her sewing text led to Woolman being hired as an assistant in domestic science at the college in 1892, one of only two women on staff up to the time. The following year, even though she had no degree, she became an instructor of sewing. While teaching she also took classes and earned a diploma in 1895 and a B.S. in 1897.

She was made an adjunct professor in 1898 and a full professor in 1903. She organized the Department of Domestic Arts at the college and initiated the scientific study of textiles there. She became known as an expert in the area.

A group of prominent New York City residents asked her for help in addressing the problems of working women. She developed a plan for a school to train women in practical skills for the textile and clothing industries. This was implemented as the Manhattan Trade School for Girls, which she opened in November 1902. She ran the school until 1910 while continuing to teach at the Teachers College.

In 1912, Woolman became acting head of the home economics department at Simmons College in Boston, a position she held until 1914. She also was elected president of the Women's Educational and Industrial Union.

As an expert in vocational education, she was a vocal proponent of the Smith–Hughes Act, which provided Federal funding for it. She lobbied for its passage.

In subsequent years, Woolman lectured at various colleges around the country, including University of California, Berkeley, Oregon Agricultural College, University of Pittsburgh, Colorado Agricultural College, University of Utah and State College of California, Santa Barbara.

In 1921 and 1926, Woolman pursued a graduate degree in economics at Radcliffe College under Thomas Nixon Carver, which led to the publication of her final book in 1935, which Carver co-wrote with her and a third author. The book viewed textiles from multiple perspectives.

== Awards ==
She was decorated by Herbert Hoover for her service during World War I organizing a Clothing Information Bureau for the Department of Agriculture. In 1926, the National Institute of Social Sciences awarded her its gold medal for "services to humanity and the promotion and conducting of industrial and vocational education." Also in 1926, she was elected to Pi Gamma Mu. In 1939 she was made a life member of the American Home Economics Association in recognition of her service to the field.

== Personal life and death ==
Woolman's husband died in 1906 after a long illness.

Woolman continued working into her seventies until an automobile accident, which caused permanent impairments. Woolman died a few years later on August 1, 1940, in Newton Highlands, Massachusetts, aged 80, and was buried in Evergreen Cemetery in her birthplace of Camden, New Jersey.

== Selected works ==
=== Books ===
- Woolman, Mary Schenck (1908). A Sewing Course for Teachers: Comprising Directions for Making the Various Stitches and Instruction in Methods of Teaching. Washington: F.A. Fernald. OCLC 889277 – via Google Books.
- Woolman, Mary Schenck (1909). The Making of a Girls Trade School: Being the Organization, Work, Problems, and Equipment of the Manhattan Trade School for Girls, New York City. New York: Columbia University Press. OCLC 20138483 – via Google Books.
- Woolman, Mary Schenck; McGowan, Ellen Beers (1914). Textiles: A Handbook for the Student and the Consumer. New York: The Macmillan Company. OCLC 23127869 – via Google Books.
- Woolman, Mary Schenck (1920). Clothing: Choice, Care, Cost. Philadelphia: J.B. Lippincott. OCLC 1687713 – via Google Books.
- Carver, Thomas Nixon; Woolman, Mary Schenck; McGowan, Ellen Beers (1935). Textile Problems for the Consumer. New York: Macmillan. OCLC 19422000 – via HathiTrust.

=== Journal articles ===
- Woolman, Mary Schenck (January 1909). "The Relative Value and Cost of Various Trades in a Girls' Trade School". The Annals of the American Academy of Political and Social Science. 33 (1): 127–140. doi:10.1177/000271620903300116. hdl:2027/hvd.hnypn1. JSTOR 1011751. S2CID 154103189 – via Google Books.
- Woolman, Mary Schenck (October 1910). "Training the Youngest Girls for Wage Earning. Systems to be Found at Present in Europe and America". Proceedings of the Academy of Political Science in the City of New York. 1 (1): 140–150. doi:10.2307/1171705. JSTOR 1171705 – via Google Books.
- Woolman, Mary Schenck (December 1, 1910). "Training of Teachers for Trade Schools". The Journal of Education. 72 (20): 538. doi:10.1177/002205741007202005. JSTOR 42817562. S2CID 189658713.
- Woolman, Mary Schenck (December 26, 1912). "Trade and Vocational Education for Girls". The Journal of Education. 76 (25): 696. doi:10.1177/002205741207602514. JSTOR 42822687. S2CID 158108605 – via Google Books.
- Woolman, Mary Schenck (August 9, 1917). "Why Vocational Education?". The Journal of Education. 86 (6): 150. doi:10.1177/002205741708600610. JSTOR 42825965. S2CID 158756723.
