= Salk School of Science =

Coordinates: 40°44′8″N 73°58′53″W

The Salk School of Science

Location
- 320 East 20th Street; New York City, New York, Mid-Atlantic; United States

Information
- Type: Public Secondary School
- Established: 1995
- School district: NYCDOE District 2
- Dean: Micheal Decicco
- Principal: Rhonda Perry
- Teaching staff: 25
- Grades: 6-8
- Enrollment: 356 students
- Campus: PS 40
- Colors: Purple and Gold
- Athletics: PSAL
- Nickname: Salk
- Accreditation: NYU Grossman School of Medicine
- National ranking: 803/25154
- Namesake: Jonas Salk
- Website: http://www.salkschool.org
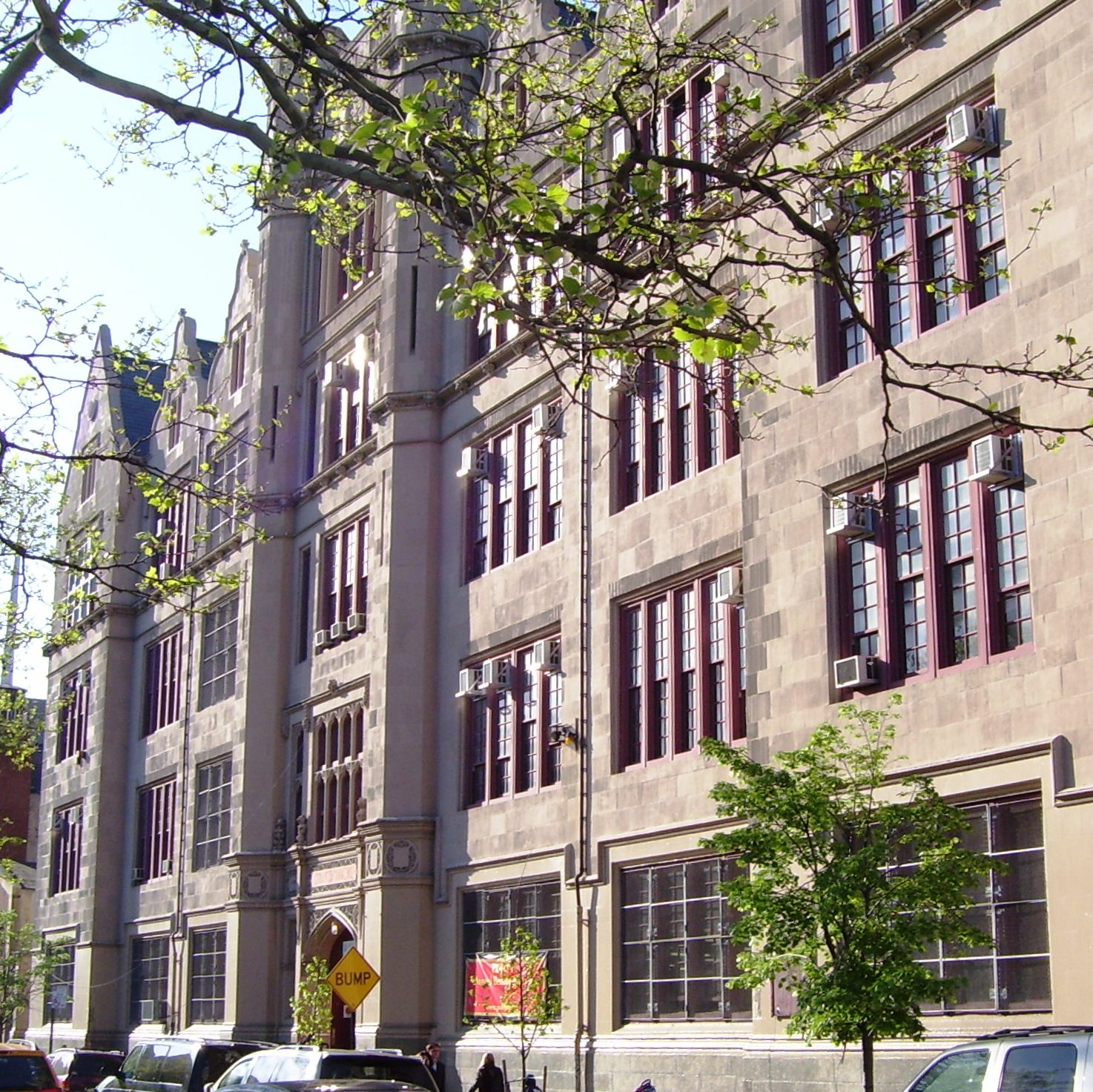
- The Salk School is housed on the fourth and fifth floors of the P.S. 40 building

The Salk School of Science is a junior high school in Gramercy, Manhattan, New York City and is a rigorous and competitive school. For the class of 2023, the admissions rate was just above 4%. It was founded in 1995 as a collaboration between the New York University School of Medicine and the New York City Department of Education. The goal of the school is to encourage enthusiasm for, and the development of abilities in, the sciences, particularly the medical and biological sciences. Science and math are specialties at the school, including special classes and after-school programs. A particular aim is to encourage city children to aim for better high schools and colleges. It is located on the top two floors of the P.S. 40 building on East 20th Street between 1st and 2nd Avenues in Manhattan.

The school was named for Jonas Salk, developer of the first polio vaccine. Salk approved the use of his name by NYU before his death in 1995.

== Academics and curriculum ==
The school's nontraditional discovery-based learning methodology has been cited as resulting in improved cognitive and reasoning skills in students.

=== Partnership with NYU ===
Members of the New York medical community work with the school to develop curriculum, and members of the Schools of Medicine and New York University School of Dentistry at New York University teach and mentor students in grades 6 through 8. The NYU Medical Center makes facilities available to the school, and members of the science faculty of the NYU School of Medicine review school students at certain points in their school career, notably at admission and graduation.

=== Academics ===
Salk has two laboratory-like science classrooms. It also utilizes the Amplify Curriculum in 6th and 7th grade.

Although the school is dubbed as a "Science School", the middle school spends an equal amount of time on humanities, as well as math.

== Leadership and faculty ==
The principal of the school is Rhonda Perry and the vice/assistant principal is Marsha Wallace. The dean of the school is Michael Deccico. In total, there are 25 teachers.

=== Admissions ===
Prior to 2019, the Salk School of Science required an admissions test, having multiple components, which tested collaboration, academic strength, and knowledge of all subject areas. This requirement was paused due to the COVID-19, and was later eliminated altogether. For all later admitted classes, a rubric was established. Whichever students scored highest among the criterion on the rubric gained admission to the school. For the classes of 2024, 2025, and 2026, a lottery system was used in addition to the rubric, due to the effects and aftermath of the COVID-19 pandemic. For further admissions information, refer to the New York City Department of Education website and/or the Salk School of Science website.

Students graduating from the school often go to the 9 Specialized High Schools of New York City, with about 60-70% of the student body being accepted every year. The remaining go to other highly-rated public schools like The Beacon School and Eleanor Roosevelt High School or private schools.

== See also ==
- Education in New York City
- New York City Department of Education
