= School of the Future (New York City) =

Public school in New York City

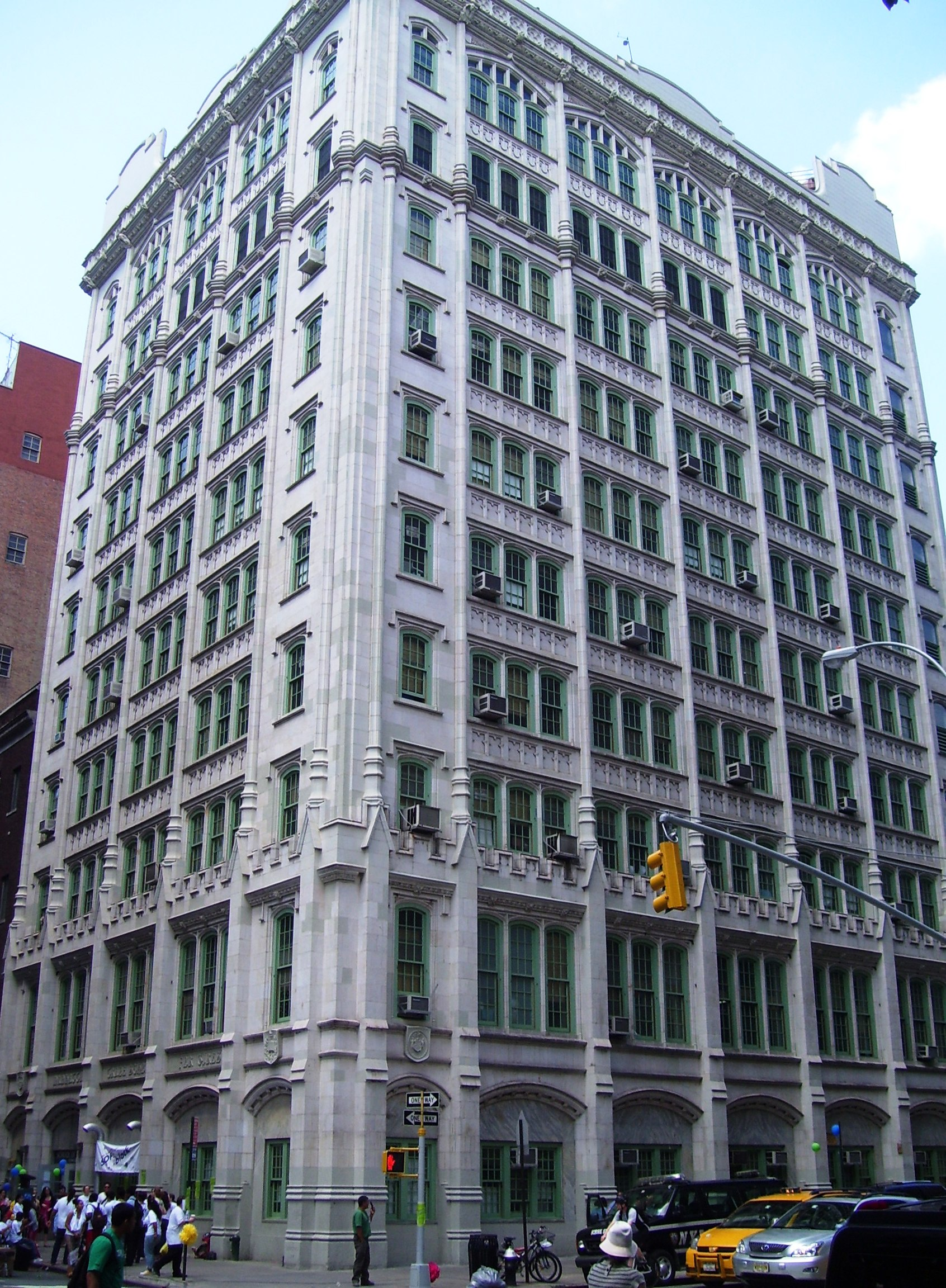

Location
- 127 East 22nd Street; New York, New York; United States; 40.7391°N 73.9853°W

Information
- Type: Public School
- Established: 1990
- Principal: Stacy Goldstein
- Grades: 6-12
- Enrollment: 713
- Colors: Navy and white
- Website: www.sof.edu

School of the Future is a public secondary school located at 127 East 22nd Street at Lexington Avenue, in the Gramercy Park neighborhood of the borough of Manhattan in New York City. It serves grades 6 through 12 as a part of the New York City Department of Education, and accepts students from around the entire city. School of the Future, a small school, was founded in 1990 with funding by Apple Inc. with an admissions process dependent on student application.

In 2019 it was recognized among the top fifty schools in New York City.

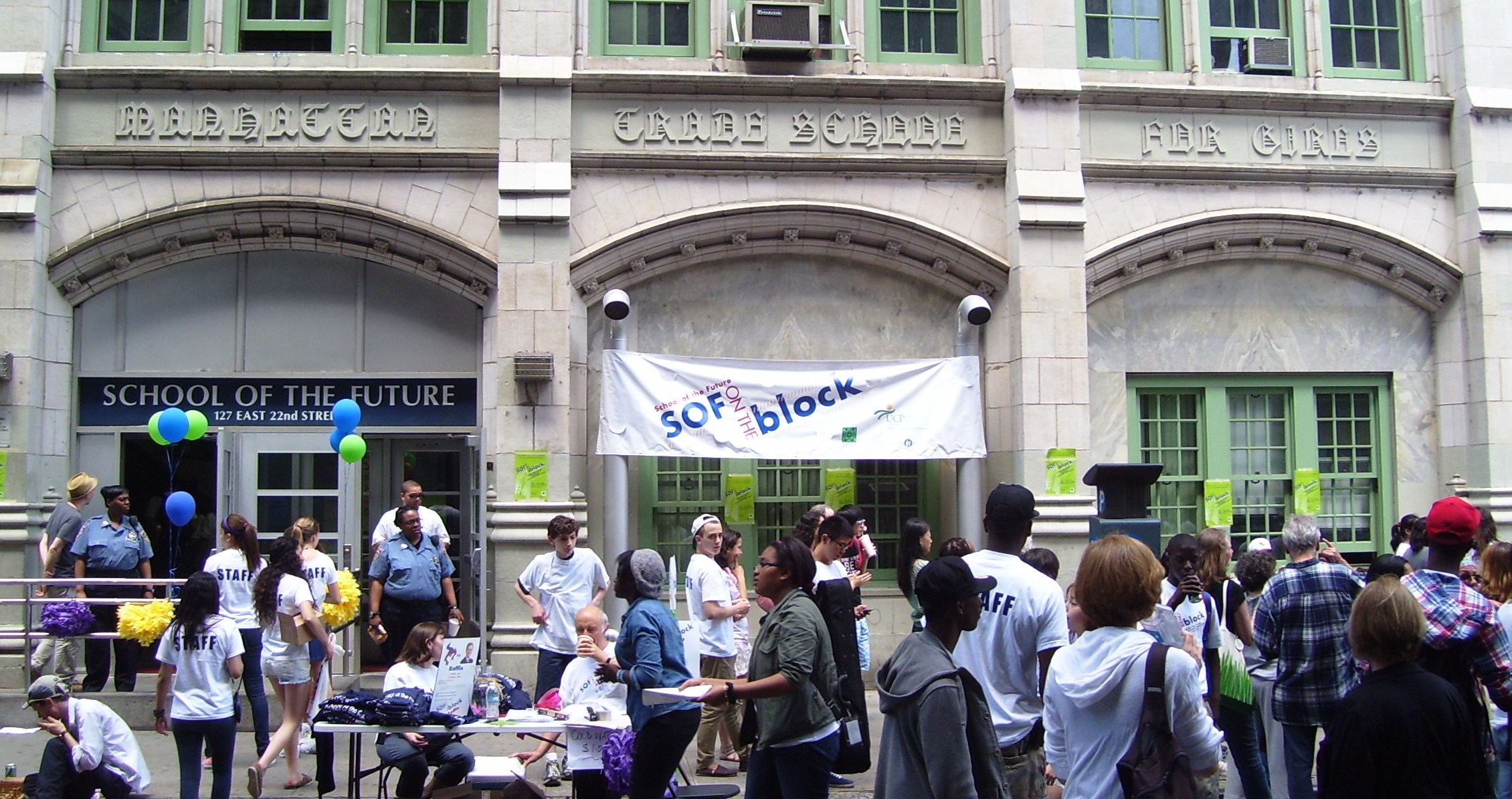
The entrance to the school during its fund-raising block party on May 21, 2011

== Building ==
The building in which School of the Future is located was constructed in 1915 as the Manhattan Trade School for Girls, and was later the Mabel Dean Bacon Vocational High School. The 11-story building was designed by C. B. J. Snyder.
