= Worker-driven social responsibility =

Human rights enforcement model

Worker-driven Social Responsibility (WSR) is a model of human rights enforcement primarily designed to empower and protect low-wage workers in global supply chains, such as farmworkers, garment workers, and fishers. Programs that employ the WSR model, such as the Fair Food Program (FFP) or the Accord on Fire and Building Safety in Bangladesh, provide low-wage workers a means for claiming, defining, and enforcing their human rights in the workplace. Through legally-binding agreements with major corporations at the top of global supply chains, workers and their organizations are able to harness the end buyers' purchasing power to drive cooperation from their employers with the programs' monitoring and enforcement processes and compliance with their fundamental human rights. Those legally-binding agreements, in conjunction with monitoring and enforcement tools, together comprise the WSR model.

The model was forged through a national campaign by the farmworker-led Coalition of Immokalee Workers (CIW) in the early 2000s to secure a series of "Fair Food" agreements from major fast food, foodservice and grocery chains in the US. On the basis of those agreements, which conditioned the brands' purchases on their suppliers' compliance with human rights, the CIW designed and launched the Fair Food Program (FFP) in 2010. The FFP's early success in turn inspired worker organizations across the globe to adopt the model, growing the new model's footprint in supply chains that are reliant on low-wage workers. As of 2024, WSR programs protect workers in a variety of industries in the US, Bangladesh, Pakistan, Lesotho, the UK, South Africa and Chile. Workers in other industries and geographies – from the seafood industry in the UK to agriculture in India, Europe and Latin America, as well as the garment industry in Sri Lanka, Morocco, and India - are in different stages of exploring or launching WSR programs in their workplaces.

In contrast to collective bargaining agreements, which secure gains for workers from their immediate employers in specific workplaces, WSR programs utilize legally-binding agreements between worker organizations and major corporations that do not directly employ the workers but significantly influence their conditions nonetheless, due to their consolidated purchasing power at the top of global supply chains. The legally-binding agreements with companies atop supply chains are an essential component of WSR, and have also been referred to as 'enforceable brand agreements.' The agreements tie purchasing to suppliers' compliance with a worker-informed code of conduct as verified by the worker-driven monitoring and enforcement process. Worker organizations and labor unions often utilize WSR agreements as complementary rights schemes to secure protections otherwise excluded from, or problematic to enforce through, collective bargaining contracts, or to protect workers who are legally excluded from the protections of labor laws.

The WSR model is also distinguished from the traditional Corporate Social Responsibility (CSR) paradigm in both structure and function. Both models point to longstanding human rights violations at the bottom of global supply chains as the principal reason for their existence, but the two approaches diverge significantly from that common starting point, on two foundational levels: 1) Who are the primary actors behind the model, and 2) How those actors view and address the labor abuses in question. In the traditional CSR paradigm, the primary actors are the brands at the top of the supply chain, who typically view longstanding human rights violations through the lens of the potential reputational harm those violations may cause their brands in the marketplace. Consequently, the CSR approach is structured almost exclusively around the annual or bi-annual social audit, a brief, finite monitoring intervention that results in a public-facing certification that is issued for a fixed period of time, usually until the next scheduled audit, and that typically lacks any meaningful mechanisms for ongoing monitoring or enforcement in the interim. In the WSR model, on the other hand, the primary actors are the workers experiencing the abuses themselves, and their primary interest lies in ending the immediate human rights crisis in their workplace, not the downstream reputational harm to brands in the marketplace. Consequently, the WSR model is structured around a mix of worker-driven monitoring and enforcement mechanisms designed to provide workers with ongoing tools for identifying and remedying rights violations in real time, and any certification is not for a fixed period into the future, but rather is contingent on continuous compliance and can be suspended at any time.

These differences in structure and function have resulted in measurable differences in outcomes, as well. Multiple studies and reports from the past decade have documented both the failure of the traditional CSR model -- including the related approach known as Multi-Stakeholder Initiatives (MSIs) -- to achieve their stated purpose of protecting human rights in the global supply chain, and the success of WSR initiatives in addressing those same abuses. The most far-reaching of those studies, a ten-year longitudinal study of 40 of the leading MSI programs and CSR certification schemes, asked the question, "Have MSIs delivered on their promise to protect human rights?" The Harvard University-incubated study concluded that MSIs "are not effective tools for holding corporations accountable for abuses, protecting rights holders against human rights violations, or providing survivors and victims with access to remedy." That same study, released in 2020, pointed to the Fair Food Program and the WSR model as the emerging "gold standard" for human rights protection in corporate supply chains, with effective mechanisms for "empowering rights-holders to know and exercise their rights."

Because the prevention of human rights violations at the bottom of the supply chain also equates to effective risk mitigation and reputational protection at the top (while the inverse does not hold true), the WSR model is increasingly seen as a "win/win/win" model capable of protecting both low-wage workers' interests as well as those of their immediate employers and the retail brands that buy the products they produce. As a result, the WSR model has won widespread recognition since its inception in 2010. WSR programs have been recognized as an "international benchmark" in the fight against modern-day slavery by the United Nations as well as the 'platinum' standard for farm labor protection in supply chains by the United States Department of Agriculture. The MacArthur Foundation called the model, "a visionary strategy with the potential to transform workplace environments across the global supply chain," and the Harvard Business Review recognized the Fair Food Program "one of the most important social impact stories of the past century."

== Origins ==
=== Campaign for Fair Food and the early development of Worker-driven Social Responsibility (2001-2010) ===
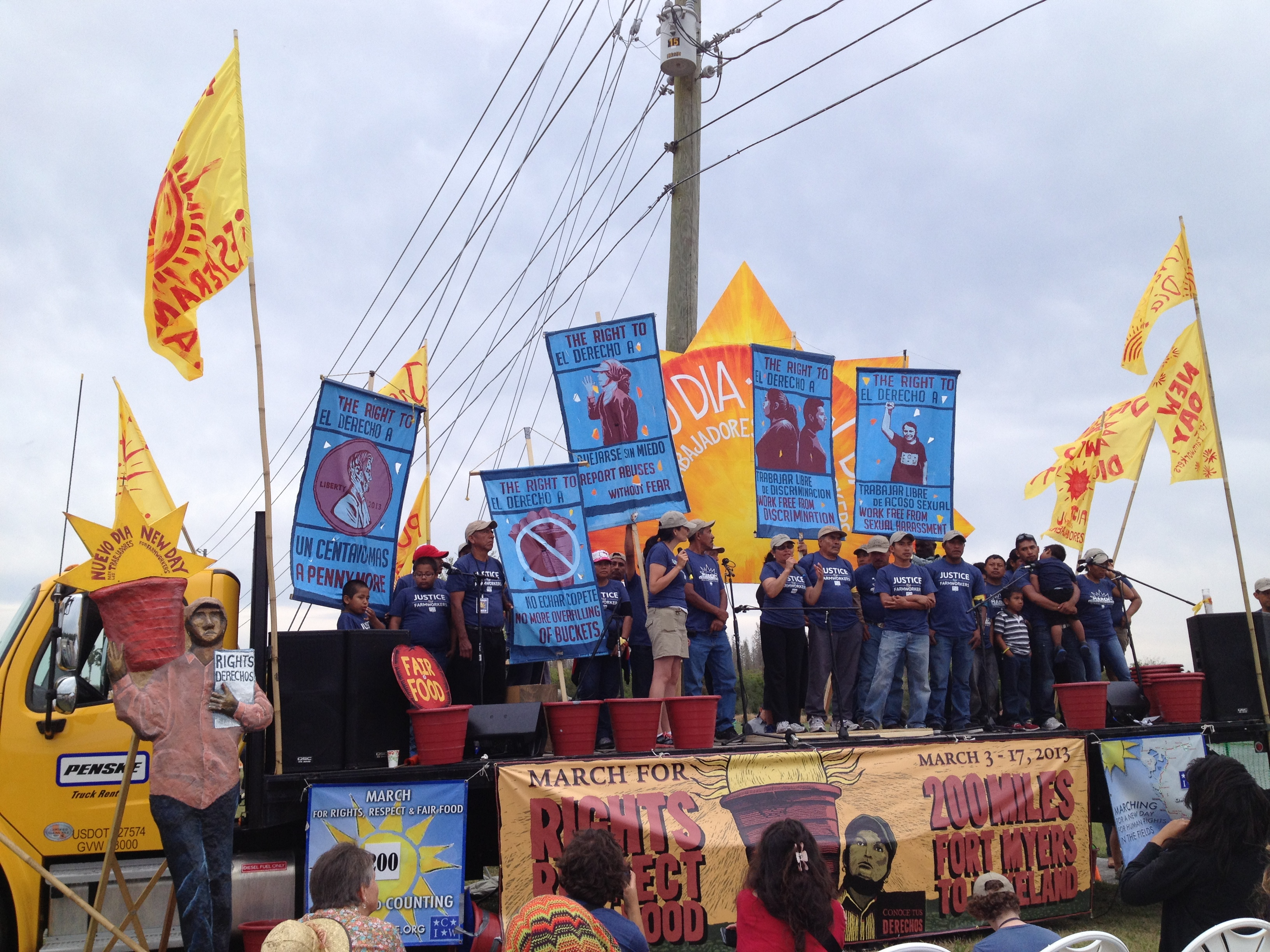
Farmworker protest organized by the Coalition of Immokalee Workers in 2013.

Through a combination of community organizing and a series of community-based labor and hunger strikes aimed at their immediate farm employers in the 1990s, farmworkers associated with the Coalition of Immokalee Workers – a community-based human rights organization located in the farmworker community of Immokalee, Florida -- secured industry-wide pay raises and exposed a series of forced labor operations that resulted in successful prosecutions and the liberation of more than 1,000 farmworkers from extreme exploitation. But despite these concrete advances, the CIW's early efforts lacked sufficient power with farms to address issues such as wage theft, sexual assault and abuse, as well as forced labor on a systemic and ongoing basis.

Placing the abuses they faced in the fields within the context of the globalized supply chains that purchase Florida produce, CIW organizers concluded that the huge multinational corporations at the top of the food system not only benefitted from the poverty and human rights violations experienced by workers in their supply chains, but that their purchasing practices were in fact a major contributing factor to those abuses. After investigating the purchasing relationships between Florida tomato growers and large food retailers, the CIW realized that the massive retail food chains were able to leverage their volume purchasing power to demand ever lower prices from their Florida tomato suppliers, and that the downward pressure on prices was in turn translated, year after year, into a concomitant downward pressure on wages and working conditions for farmworkers. To address these conditions, the CIW concluded, both growers and megabrands had a responsibility to use their power to ensure dignified conditions for farmworkers. In so doing, the CIW located the new form of power that workers in Immokalee had been seeking to redress the imbalance of power at the root of the abuses they faced for years, and they set out on a new organizing path to harness that power through sustained, ongoing agreements with buyers. According to Greg Asbed, a co-founder of the CIW:

We had to take a step back and realize, OK, we've been fighting in Immokalee this whole time. But the tomatoes that get picked in the fields don't stay in Immokalee. The food system doesn't stop at the growers because the food is consumed. We're connected to a bigger world. That's when we came out and said, 'Taco Bell makes farmworkers poor.'

Following this strategic recalculation, the CIW launched a nationwide effort in 2001 to boycott Taco Bell until they agreed to sign a binding agreement with farmworkers for better pay and working conditions in their tomato suppliers' operations. The CIW organized a national network of consumer allies, mobilizing students, people of faith, organized labor, and other conscious consumers behind their demand that Taco Bell recognize its responsibility for the poverty and abuse in its supply chain and commit to addressing farmworkers' concerns. This boycott lasted from 2001 until 2005, when Taco Bell and its parent company, Yum Brands, the largest restaurant company in the world, agreed to the CIW's terms and began, 1) paying a premium – a penny a pound - for their produce, which growers then were responsible for passing on to workers as a bonus in their paychecks, and 2) only buying Florida tomatoes from growers that the CIW determines to be respecting their workers' rights. CIW Co-Founder Lucas Benitez said at the time of signing, "This is an important victory for farmworkers, one that establishes a new standard of social responsibility for the fast-food industry and makes an immediate material change in the lives of workers. This sends a clear challenge to other industry leaders."

This agreement marked the first formal iteration of the kind of legally-binding agreement at the heart of the WSR model that distinguishes the model from traditional CSR initiatives -- the first binding agreement from a major corporation to continuously pay a premium intended to supplement the wages of farmworkers as well as a commitment to implement a worker-generated Code of Conduct for agricultural suppliers with a worker organization responsible for ensuring compliance with those Code standards. This latter term, placing the responsibility for monitoring and certifying compliance on participating growers' farms in the worker organization's hands – or a third party monitor of the worker organization's choosing – was crucial to locking in the worker-driven nature of the model, and would prove pivotal to the trajectory of the CIW's efforts as the second decade of the 2000s began.

Between the years 2005-2010, CIW's Campaign for Fair Food continued to organize and win similar consumer campaigns against other major buyers of produce, securing agreements with McDonalds, Burger King, Chipotle, Subway, Whole Foods, and Bon Appetit, Compass, Sodexo and Aramark (the grocery chains Giant and Stop & Shop, Fresh Market, and Walmart would sign between 2010 and 2015). At the same time, the CIW's anti-modern-day slavery efforts continued to expose forced labor operations, leading federal prosecutors to dub the Florida agricultural industry "ground zero for modern-day slavery." However, despite the growing market support for the CIW's plans to launch a worker-driven certification program and public pressure on the Florida tomato industry to enact reforms, the Florida Tomato Growers' Exchange (FTGE), the primary growers' association representing over 90% of Florida's tomato production, formally boycotted any effort to implement the agreements, including threatening their members with prohibitively large fines for any instance of receiving and passing along the "penny per pound" premium from participating buyers to their workers.

This stalemate lasted until 2010, when Pacific Tomato Growers (PTG), the second largest tomato grower in Florida, became the first major company to break with the FTGE and defy its boycott, signing an agreement directly with the CIW to implement the organization's Fair Food Code of Conduct on their farm. Roughly one month after PTG broke with the FTGE, Lipman Family Farms, the state's largest grower, followed suit. At that point, the market incentives built into the CIW's buyers' agreements -- which would require nearly a dozen of the country's largest buyers of tomatoes to buy all of their Florida tomatoes only from PTG and Lipman – created an overwhelming incentive for the remainder of the Florida tomato industry to drop its resistance and join the still fledgling Fair Food Program. In November, 2010, the FTGE signed an agreement with the CIW, ending its boycott of the nascent Fair Food Program and expanding the implementation and enforcement of newfound rights for farmworkers to roughly 30,000 workers in over 90% of the Florida tomato industry.

The sudden influx of tens of thousands of workers under the fledgling program's protections soon prompted the CIW to build and launch an independent third-party monitor, the Fair Food Standards Council, to enforce the Fair Food Code of Conduct. The CIW's first efforts at monitoring and enforcing the code in 2010 were done, following an exhaustive exploration of existing auditing firms, in collaboration with firms whose only experience was in the context of the traditional, audit-based CSR model. The clash between the intensive, worker-driven WSR model, with its complaint investigation and resolution process and extensive audit protocols, and the more superficial CSR model became immediately obvious, rendering any existing auditing firm insufficient to implement the FFP's worker-driven, enforcement-focused approach. The decision to build and launch the Fair Food Standards Council to staff, investigate, and resolve the FFP's 24/7 complaint mechanism, and carry out the program's intensive field and farm office audits (including the requirement to interview a minimum of 50% of all workers at any farm), was made in early 2011 and with it was established the final piece of the inaugural WSR program, setting the standard for all future iterations of the model.

== Elements and Implementation ==
The Worker-driven Social Responsibility model is an approach to human rights enforcement defined by the unique mix of educational, monitoring, and enforcement mechanisms that, when combined, empower workers to serve as frontline defenders of their own rights. The objectives of the WSR model are to identify, investigate, remedy, and ultimately prevent human rights violations in the workplace.

The following elements are the essential components of a WSR program, each mechanism necessary -- but not sufficient in isolation -- for the program to function effectively:

1. a worker-informed Code of Conduct, its standards reflecting a combination of workers' existing rights in law and custom and any additional rights and worksite protections that workers deem necessary;

2. a recurring process for worker education, done on the clock and in the workplace, to inform workers of their rights under the code and the mechanisms available to them to report potential violations;

3. an easily accessible, protected complaint mechanism (with enforceable guarantees of non-retaliation for workers reporting issues) for workers to bring potential code violations to the attention of a monitoring body staffed by investigators who investigate complaints and draft corrective action plans to remedy workers' grievances under the code;

4. regular worksite audits carried out by a monitoring body to interview workers and company personnel, review payroll and other relevant management documents and reports, and assess management systems against the requirements of the code and draft corrective action plans to ensure compliance;

5. market consequences for suppliers that violate standards as established in legally-binding agreements with participating retailers.

Most WSR programs also include some form of price premium s paid by participating buyers to assist participating suppliers in meeting program standards, including wage increases passed on to workers, housing, workplace safety, and other workplace improvements, and support for monitoring costs, as well as the establishment of committees and/or other ongoing bodies designed to facilitate worker communication with management, and to help adapt the Code of Conduct as necessary to changes in working conditions.

These constitutive elements are all guaranteed by legally binding agreements with major corporations that agree to preferentially source from workplaces that follow a WSR Code of Conduct, and to cease purchases from worksites found in serious violation of WSR program standards. This creates a strong market incentive for suppliers to participate in WSR programs, ranging from textile and garment factories to farms and dairy operations, and to comply with WSR Codes of Conduct, including refraining from retaliation against workers who bring complaints to the attention of investigators and auditors, cooperating with the investigative and auditing process, and implementing any resulting corrective action plans.

Those agreements, while essential to securing the leverage that powers WSR programs to implement transformative change in the workplace, are not sufficient to classify an initiative as a WSR program. The worker leadership at the heart of the model is ensured and expressed through the remaining essential elements – a worker-informed code of conduct, worker education, a 24/7 complaint mechanism, and in-depth audits – that allow workers to play their essential role as monitors of their own rights and, over time, identify the longstanding human rights violations and the actors responsible for those abuses and eliminate them from the workplace.

Worker organizations looking to build or expand a WSR program often rely on public-facing campaigns to compel multinational corporations to sign binding agreements in order to establish the market power that undergirds the model. The CIW, for example, has relied on sustained campaigns including multi-day marches, pickets, national boycotts, and fasts outside of corporate headquarters to secure binding agreements with corporate buyers of produce including Taco Bell, McDonalds, Trader Joes, Chipotle, and Subway among others. The 2014 documentary film Food Chains shows farmworkers and consumer allies of the CIW engaging in a multi-day hunger strike outside Publix headquarters to call on the Florida-based grocery chain to join the Fair Food Program.

The Clean Clothes Campaign, which helps pressure buyers to sign onto the International Accord as well as to help raise awareness of garment industry abuses, uses a mixture of protests and 'culture jamming' to secure WSR agreements and push corporations to take responsibility for the low-wage workers in their supply chain. For example in January 2023, during Berlin Fashion Week, Clean Clothes Campaign activists collaborated with The Yes Men and posed as Adidas executives in announcing a Cambodian garment union leader as co-CEO of the company, and showcasing a new fashion line consisting of "carefully distressed" garments "upcycled from clothing worn non-stop for six months by Cambodian workers who are owed wages withheld during the [COVID-19] pandemic." According to the Clean Clothes Campaign:

Although the action was a hoax, it carries a very real message: Adidas needs to get serious about workers' rights and sign the Pay Your Workers agreement to protect them. The agreement will guarantee garment workers the full wages owed to them since the pandemic began, and includes the establishment of a severance guarantee fund to ensure that no workers are left penniless and fighting for the severance pay legally-owed to them, should they lose their jobs.

== WSR Programs in Practice Around the World ==
=== Fair Food Program (2010-Present) ===
Main page: Fair Food Program

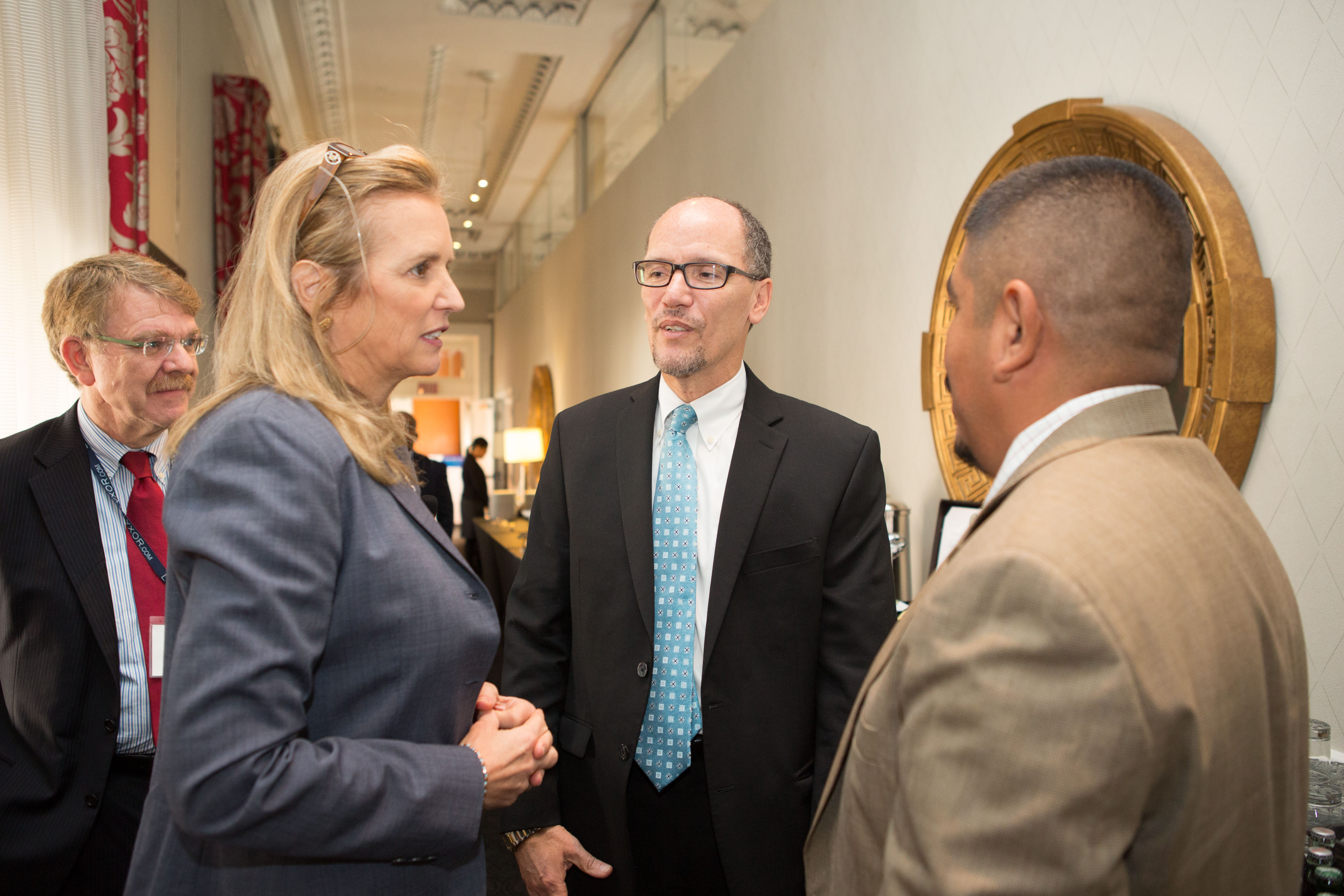
Secretary of Labor Thomas Perez speaking with Kerry Kennedy and Lucas Benitez (Coalition of Immokalee Workers) in 2015.

Established in 2010, the Fair Food Program is a partnership among growers, farmworkers, and retail food brands to improve conditions for farmworkers. The Fair Food Program functions through legally binding agreements between the CIW and large retail companies that pledge to preferentially purchase produce from growers who follow the Fair Food Program's Code of Conduct, which contains protections against human rights violations including forced labor, sexual assault and harassment, wage theft, violence, discrimination, retaliation, and dangerous working conditions. The CIW's agreements with participating buyers also require those major retail food corporations to pay their suppliers a price premium that is passed on to farmworkers in the form of a bonus in their regular paycheck. By signing an agreement with the CIW, brands pledge to cease purchasing from any grower that is suspended from the Program for violating its standards. The Fair Foods Standards Council (FFSC) oversees the program and ensures that its standards are upheld, certifying growers that are found to be in compliance.

The Fair Food Program is credited with helping eradicate modern-day slavery, sexual assault and violence against farmworkers on participating farms, and had extended its protections to workers in 23 states and over a dozen crops domestically as of November, 2024. Since the Fair Food Program's inception, participating buyers have paid over $50 million in premium passed on to farmworkers and the Fair Food Standards Council has resolved thousands of issues raised by worker complaints and its own audits. "When I first visited Immokalee, I heard appalling stories of abuse and modern slavery,' said Susan L. Marquis, dean of the Pardee RAND Graduate School, a public policy institution in Santa Monica, Calif. 'But now the tomato fields in Immokalee are probably the best working environment in American agriculture. In the past three years, they've gone from being the worst to the best.'" As of 2023, the Fair Food Program's enforceable protections have been extended to workers outside the US, including farms in Chile and South Africa.

The CIW's Fair Food Program has inspired and consulted with other worker organizations in low-wage industries in the US and overseas, supporting their efforts to launch their own WSR programs based on the FFP. In the US there is an active WSR program in the dairy industry as well as campaigns to establish WSR in construction, plant nurseries, and meat packing. Building on the success of the Fair Food Program, dairy workers in Vermont designed and launched the Milk with Dignity Program with assistance from the CIW and FFSC after campaigning for, and securing, a legally binding agreement with Ben & Jerry's. Also with technical advice from the CIW, construction workers in Minneapolis have been actively campaigning to win legally binding agreements with developers to require construction companies to comply with a human rights-based code of conduct as part of efforts to establish the first WSR program in the construction industry. In October, 2023, Centro de Trabajadores Unidos en la Lucha (CTUL, the organization leading the WSR adaptation process in Minnesota) announced its first agreements with to Minnesota-based developers. Poultry workers in Arkansas have also been campaigning to build a WSR program and are seeking an agreement between the worker organization Venceremos and Tyson Foods that would focus on the health and safety of meatpacking workers, and nursery workers with WeCount in South Florida are likewise working with the CIW and the FFSC to adapt the FFP to the plant nursery industry that supplies large box stores from Home Depot and Lowes to Walmart and Target. The Fair Food Program's WSR model is also currently being adapted to address longstanding labor violations in the UK fishing industry in collaboration with the International Transport Workers Federation, a global trade union, and has most recently undertaken a collaboration with SOC-SAT, a farmworker union in the Almeria region of southern Spain, to explore the development of a WSR program in the Spanish produce industry.

=== Bangladesh Accord (2013-2021) and the International Accord (2021 - Present) ===
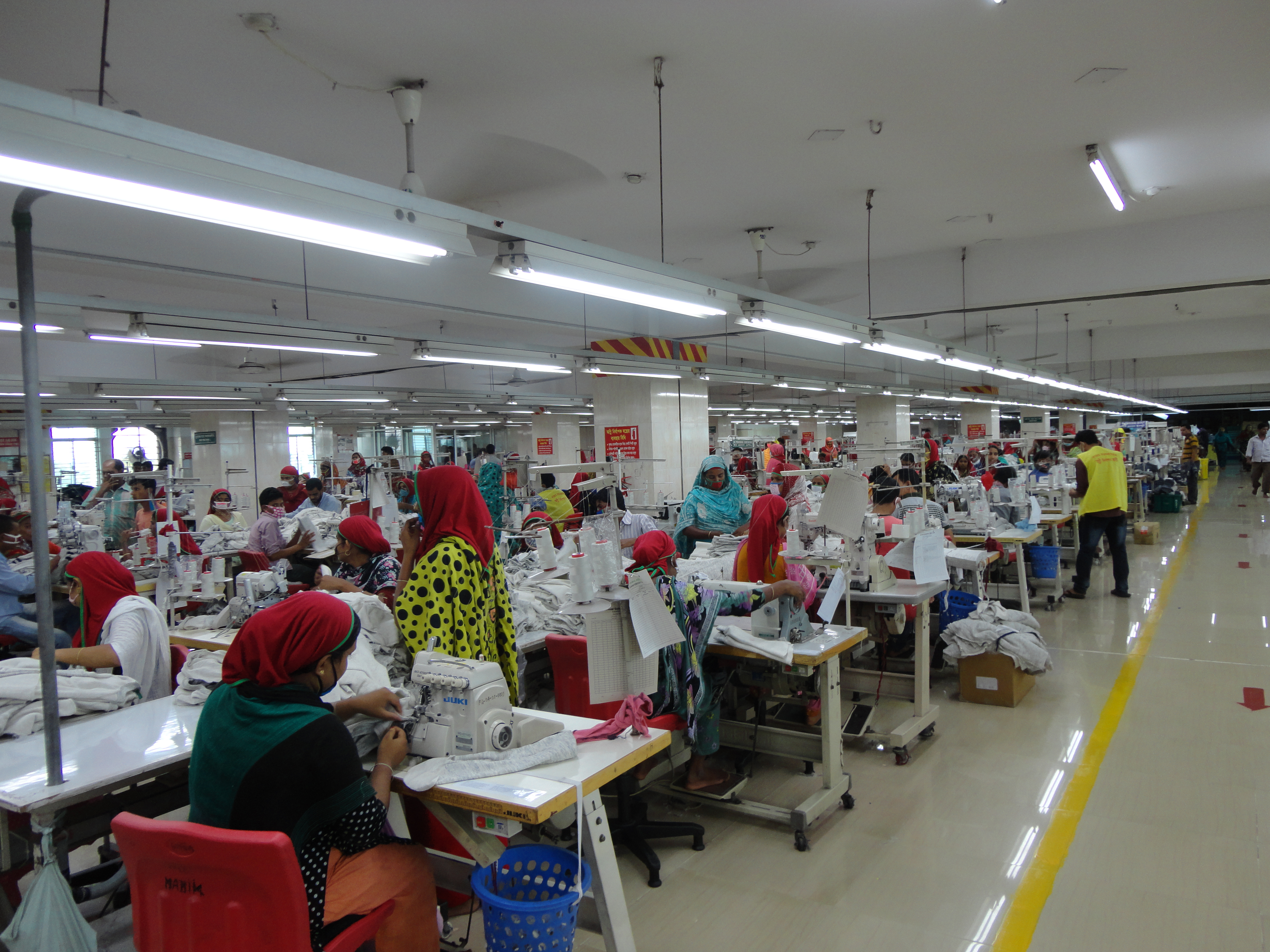
Garment workers in Bangladesh (2013).

The International Accord for Health and Safety in the Textile and Garment Industry, formally known as The Accord on Fire and Building Safety in Bangladesh, also known as The Accord, is an independent, legally binding agreement between brands and trade unions, both local and global, to protect garment and textile workers in Bangladesh. The Accord covers factories producing Ready-Made Garments (RMG) and at the option of signatory companies, home textiles and fabric & knit accessories. In total, 2.7 million garment and textile workers in Bangladesh working at over 1,600 factories are protected by The Accord. The Accord is backed by legally binding agreements with 199 buyers including Adidas, ASOS, H&M, Target, Uniqlo, M&S, American Eagle, Pull&Bear, Massimo Dutti, Trader Joe's, and Sainsbury's.

=== Milk with Dignity (2017 - Present) ===
Milk with Dignity protects the rights of dairy farmworkers in Vermont, and was established after the worker-led organization Migrant Justice signed a binding agreement with Ben & Jerry's in 2017. Their signing came after a two-year national consumer pressure campaign organized by farmworkers that included marches, protests, and pickets. Migrant Justice's campaign was inspired and advised by the CIW, and catalyzed in part by a 2014 study on Vermont's dairy industry revealing long working hours, systemic wage theft, overcrowded housing as well as other workplace hazards.

=== Pakistan Accord (2023- Present) ===
Following the success of the Bangladesh-based Accord, unions and major clothing brands replicated the WSR scheme in Pakistan in 2023. Building on widespread safety improvements in Bangladesh, the Pakistan Accord includes all key International Accord features: independent safety inspections to address identified fire, electrical, structural and boiler hazards, monitoring and supporting remediation, Safety Committee training and worker safety awareness program, an independent complaint mechanism, a commitment to broad transparency, and local capacity-building to enhance a culture of health and safety in the industry.

=== Lesotho Agreement (2019- Present) ===
The Lesotho Agreement, launched in 2019 as a collaboration among local and international unions, women's rights organizations, and multinational clothing retailers, is primarily aimed at addressing and preventing gender-based violence at work for the workforce, which is mostly women. The Independent Democratic Union of Lesotho (IDUL), the United Textile Employees (UNITE), the National Clothing Textile and Allied Workers Union (NACTWU), Federation of Women Lawyers in Lesotho (FIDA) and the Women and Law in Southern African Research and Education Trust-Lesotho (WLSA) secured legally binding agreements from Levi Strauss & Co., The Children's Place, Kontoor Brands, and Wrangler to institute a worker-written Code of Conduct at Nien Hsing textile factories.

=== The Dindigul Agreement (2022 - Present) ===
The Dindigul Agreement convenes Dalit-worker led unions and international worker organizations with multinational fashion companies H&M, Gap Inc., and PVH Corp., and is focused primarily on addressing and preventing gender-based violence and harassment at Eastman factories in Dindigul, which is a southern state of Tamil Nadu in India. Through binding agreements, the Dindigul Agreement also ensures the right to form and join a union.

=== WSR in Fishing (2024-Present) ===
Following revelations of widespread and systemic exploitation of migrant workers on fishing vessels, talks began in 2022 of bringing the WSR model to fishing in the UK. In January 2024, industry leaders within UK seafood launched the first WSR program for fishers. A two-year pilot program with the potential to extend further, the program was launched by Focus on Labour Exploitation (FLEX), the International Transport Workers Federation (ITF), and the Fair Food Program (FFP), and convenes a partnership between the Seafood Ethics Action Alliance (SEA Alliance), a pre-competitive collaboration of retailers and seafood businesses whose members represent 95 per cent of the UK seafood market, and The Scottish White Fish Producers Association (SWFPA), and the ITF.

=== Planting Justice (2025-Present) ===
Plant nursery workers with the Florida-based worker center and human rights organization WeCount! began efforts to launch a Worker-driven Social Responsibility (WSR) program in the plant nursery industry after lobbying efforts to implement county-wide heat stress standards were blocked by state lawmakers in 2024. One worker with WeCount told the Miami Herald: “We’re fighting to have an independent monitoring organization that will listen to us, that will investigate the complaints of workers, and will make sure that our rights are respected, that our wages are paid properly, that our conditions are safe. And if nurseries don’t comply, there are real consequences, and they will have to leave the program.” In February 2026, WeCount! and the Washington, D.C.-based think tank Demos published a report titled The Human Cost of Houseplants: Labor Conditions of Florida’s Plant Nursery Workers, documenting alleged abuses in the industry including sexual harassment and intimidation, wage theft, retaliation, heat stress, and pesticide exposure, while exploring how a WSR program could address and prevent such abuses.

The CIW have been involved in ongoing efforts with WeCount! to develop the initiative. In a 2026 statement, the CIW said: “CIW has partnered with worker and human rights organizations across industries and geographies to adapt this model many times before — from dairy in Vermont to construction in Minnesota, and most recently in the sugar industry in India and the banana sector in Ecuador. That same collaboration is now taking shape in the plant nursery sector here in Florida, where WeCount! members are organizing to win the same basic protections farmworkers have secured on Fair Food Program farms.”

== Impact ==
=== WSR and 21st Century Supply Chains ===
Academics studying the intersection of business and human rights assert that the rise of WSR programs is a response to the growing phenomena of the casualization, outsourcing, and sub-contracting of labor, which collectively have eroded traditional means of protecting labor rights via collective bargaining agreements and state laws. Thanks to the success of current WSR programs, as well as the model's adaptability to a wide array of industries and conditions, WSR has emerged as an important new paradigm for human rights protections.

In Focus on Labour Exploitation's 2020 report on WSR, Meri Åhlberg writes:

Where traditional means of protecting workers' rights are struggling to keep up with changes in the way work is structured, WSR provides a potential solution to win practical gains for workers and protect them against exploitation… Increasingly this applies not only to production supply chains, such as agriculture and garment manufacturing, but also to service sectors such as cleaning and catering…WSR is not concerned with directly employed workers, who are more likely to have stable contracts, benefits and union representation, but rather with outsourced or offshored workers i.e. those in the 'secondary' labour market, where it is all about statutory minimums and you see much more immigrants and women and people who are not seen as part of the 'prime workforce.' To effectively address poor working conditions and ensure decent work for these workers, it is crucial to address the power relationship not only between workers and their direct employers – the suppliers – but between the suppliers and the lead company as well. This is because wages and conditions for outsourced workers are ultimately set by the company at the top of the supply chain.

To analyze the efficacy of WSR to address the myriad human rights issues within 21st century supply chains, Kunz et al. deployed a quantitative, agent-based model and concluded that WSR represents a proven solution to entrenched abuse: "We find that a well-designed programme using market-based incentives has a strong potential to jointly combat modern slavery and bring positive change to an industry. We show that the market structure in the industry has a strong impact on the adoption of anti-slavery programs… It is important for the organisation protecting worker rights (e.g., CIW) to reach the tipping point where most actors join before it runs out of resources. To speed up this process, it may use multipliers, i.e., influential actors that will incentivize others to join the program. In doing so, it should focus its efforts on large buyers, because these actors will lead other actors to adopt the program. Applying these insights will help an organisation replicate the success of the FFP in a different context."

Dillard et al. analyzed the efficacy of WSR programs, including the Fair Food Program, relying on a critical dialogic accountability (CDA) methodological framework, and concluded similarly to Kunz et al., arguing that by empowering workers and giving them a meaningful voice, WSR works to democratize the workplace by generating enforceable lines of accountability. They write: "the [Fair Food] program is transformative and affirmative in that it reflects a process that has resulted in the redistribution of power and resources, as well as restoration of rights along the supply chain."

=== WSR Compared to Corporate Social Responsibility ===
In contrast to WSR, scholars find that other models claiming to safeguard human rights of workers, including Corporate Social Responsibility (CSR) and Multi-Stakeholder Initiatives (MSIs) have demonstrably failed to adequately respond to and prevent violations of rights. This is primarily due to these programs lacking legally binding agreements mandating market consequences for rights violators within the supply chain. For example in 2023, James Daria found systemic violations of farmworkers' human rights on farms in Mexico that were certified by Fair Trade USA and the Ethical Food Initiative – both of them prominent global CSR programs. Daria conducted over 200 field interviews of farmworkers and found that both certification schemes had failed to meaningfully protect workers against harassment, sexual misconduct, wage theft, and retaliation.

In a follow-up study published in 2023, Daria further contends there have even been recent reports indicating possible instances of forced labor on Fair Trade and Ethical Food Initiative-certified farms. He writes: "Workers describe conditions that check off nearly every one of the ILO's indicators of forced labor. Workers were recruited with deceptive practices, had documents and pay withheld, and were lodged in isolation in filthy conditions. This chapter also includes discussion of how both independent union organizing and outside pressure can support the resolution of such cases." Daria recommends that "independent workers' organizations must be directly engaged in the development and monitoring of any programs that claim to protect workers' rights," and that "brands must replace voluntary certifications with binding agreements with independent worker organizations in their supply chains to ensure workers' rights are protected."

Scholars note that the grievance resolution processes of WSR programs are a unique characteristic that empower workers to voice concerns and impose stiff penalties on delayed responses through market consequences, thus standing apart from CSR schemes. One report on the complaint process for the Fair Food Program, for example, notes: "Through its 24-hour hotline for workers, the program has received more than 3,600 complaints and resolved 82% of them in less than a month. (Farmworkers can report Fair Food Program violations to the hotline; the number is on their pay slips, and education sessions also explain how to lodge complaints.) More than 88,000 workers have attended education sessions on Fair Food farms, and Fair Food audits have uncovered—and helped address—more than 9,300 labor violations" Dr. Susan Marquis points out that the comparatively quick resolution process to grievances fits the rapid pace of employment turnaround in low-wage and seasonal work.

By comparison, CSR auditing models have been shown to produce fraudulent or incomplete data and are subject to corporate capture by buyers at the top of the supply chain. According to Human Rights Watch, "standard social audits present greater risks for labor abuses being underdetected or undetected, especially for issues like discrimination and harassment, forced labor, child labor, and freedom of association." This is because many social auditing firms' services are paid for by the suppliers themselves creating a systemic conflict of interest where auditing firms do not want to risk losing business by being overly harsh in their findings, and demand quick turnaround from auditors, often meaning less time spent interviewing workers. Combined with the lack of market enforceability for any violations found at the workplace, experts contend that CSR often amounts to a form of 'fairwashing' whereby large corporations use ethically compromised social auditing and certification schemes to portray their business and labor practices as ethical, disguising human rights violations in the process. A decade-long study of CSR and MSI programs in comparison to WSR found that "MSIs are not effective tools for holding corporations accountable for abuses, protecting rights holders against human rights violations, or providing survivors and victims with access to remedy," while in the case of WSR initiatives, "In every instance of expansion and replication, new workers have seen the concrete benefits of the model's worker-driven monitoring mechanisms and market-backed enforcement."

Value redistribution and changes in the sourcing practices of buyers are the crucial strategies through which WSR programs address the real-life consequences for workers of the buyer-driven price squeeze in global supply chains. Most recent initiatives focus on value redistribution notably through price premiums and stopping traditional sources of wage theft.

== See also ==
- Coalition of Immokalee Workers
- Fair Food Program
- Accord on Fire and Building Safety in Bangladesh
- Food Chains
- Clean Clothes Campaign
- Corporate Social Responsibility
