= Ancestral Guard =

Nonprofit organization in California

- Founder: Sammy Gensaw; Jon Luke Gensaw
- Founded at: Yurok Indian Reservation
- Type: Nonprofit organization
- Leader: Sammy Gensaw

Ancestral Guard is a nonprofit organization in California that teaches fishing and farming methods to indigenous youth.

== Background ==
Sammy Gensaw became involved in community organizing to remove four hydroelectric dams from the Klamath River in 2008, when he was 14. Three years later, he and his younger brother Jon Luke Gensaw began teaching local children traditional Yurok techniques for catching and cooking salmon from the river, calling the project the Ancestral Guard. The Ancestral Guard is directed by Sammy Gensaw and was incorporated as a nonprofit organization in 2015.

== Activity ==
The Ancestral Guard teach traditional techniques for catching and cooking salmon, as well as methods for farming. They additionally work with other indigenous groups around the world and educate people about the Yurok tribe's historical foodways.

In 2020, during the COVID-19 pandemic, Ancestral Guard began a five-year program focused on food sovereignty. The program began with the Victorious Gardens Initiative, involving the creation of a community garden as well as 30 garden boxes at residences on the Yurok Indian Reservation and in nearby Crescent City and Klamath. The organization additionally organized food deliveries to elderly people and others who were heavily impacted by COVID-19.

== Recognition ==
The 2020 documentary film Gather highlighted the work of the Ancestral Guard along with other people and groups such as Twila Cassadore and Café Gozhóó.
