= Hamilton Fish V =

American publisher

- Born: Hamilton Fish; September 5, 1951 (age 75); Washington, D.C., United States
- Education: Harvard University (BA, 1973)
- Occupations: Publisher; film producer
- Spouse: Sandra Harper
- Children: 2
- Parent(s): Hamilton Fish IV and Julia MacKenzie
- Family: Fish family

Hamilton "Ham" Fish V (born September 5, 1951) is an American publisher and film producer based in New York City. He has worked with The Nation, The Nation Institute, The New Republic, and The Washington Spectator. As of December 2024, he is publisher and editor of The Washington Spectator.

Fish helped acquire The Nation in 1977 with Victor Navasky and later served as president of The Nation Institute from 1995 to 2009. His work at the institute included journalism fellowships, investigative journalism projects, Nation Books, the Ridenhour Prizes and TomDispatch. He also produced documentary films, including Hôtel Terminus: The Life and Times of Klaus Barbie, which received the Academy Award for Best Documentary Feature in 1989.

Fish sought the Democratic nomination for the United States House of Representatives in New York in 1988 and 1994. In 2017, he resigned from positions at The New Republic after workplace misconduct allegations.

== Early life and education ==
Fish was born in Washington, D.C., to Julia (MacKenzie) and Hamilton Fish IV, a Republican politician and member of the influential Fish family. He attended schools in New York City and Massachusetts, where he graduated from Harvard University in 1973.

While at Harvard University in 1971, Fish co-founded the National Movement for the Student Vote with Morris Abram Jr. Conceived in response to the passage of the Twenty-sixth Amendment to the United States Constitution granting eighteen year-olds the right to vote, the organization assisted college-age voters whose efforts to register to vote on or near their campuses were resisted by local authorities.

Following graduation, Fish worked as chief fundraiser for the Ramsey Clark for Senate campaign in New York. Ramsey Clark, a Democrat and former Attorney General of the United States in the Johnson administration, ran as an anti-war candidate and reinforced his opposition to the influence of money in electoral politics by imposing a per person limit of $100 on contributions to his campaign. Victor Navasky, with whom Fish later joined forces at The Nation, was Clark's campaign manager, and Mark Green, whose many subsequent campaigns Fish worked on, was director of policy and issues research.

== Career ==
=== The Nation ===
Fish is perhaps best known for his work revitalizing The Nation magazine and its sister foundation, The Nation Institute. In 1977, Fish teamed up with Victor Navasky and began the work of recruiting investors to acquire the magazine, then in receivership. Together with the help of a group of limited partners that included E. L. Doctorow, Norman Lear, Alan Sagner, and Dorothy Schiff, Fish and Navasky began a decade-long partnership as publisher and editor of the country's oldest political weekly. During their stewardship, The Nation experienced steady growth, modernized its publishing operation, prospered in many respects during the Ronald Reagan years, and caused a measure of mayhem worthy of an independent political journal. The magazine waged an honorable if lonely battle over the history of the Cold War, lost a landmark lawsuit over the protection of copyright in the Supreme Court of the United States, and convened large scale conferences including the 1981 Writers' Congress, which examined the status of writers and their representation (and spawned the National Writers Union); as well as the Dialogo de Todas Las Americas, to establish a cultural and political discourse between north and south as a counter to the interventionist doctrine of the Reagan years. In 1987, Fish transferred his interest in the magazine to Arthur Carter, a New York investor who had started the Litchfield County Times and who succeeded Fish as The Nation's publisher.

From 1995 to 2009 Fish served as president of The Nation Institute, the foundation associated with The Nation magazine. With support from donors including the Lannan Foundation and Paul Newman, he developed a journalism fellowship program to provide support for progressive writers, a roster that would eventually include Eric Alterman, Max Blumenthal, Tom Engelhardt, Chris Hedges, Scott Horton, Naomi Klein, Katha Pollitt, Jeremy Scahill, and Jonathan Schell. He also created the Alfred Knobler Fellowships, named for a benefactor and longtime friend of The Nation, specifically to support journalists of color. Recipients have included Pamela Newkirk, New York University Journalism Professor and author; Gary Younge, the US-based columnist for The Guardian and The Nation; and Ta-Nehisi Coates, author, blogger, and senior editor for The Atlantic. With the help of the Lear Foundation, the Lannan Foundation, and the Puffin Foundation, Fish created an investigative journalism division, directed by Esther Kaplan and Joe Conason, to fund and oversee long-form investigative projects; with Tom Engelhardt he developed the website tomdispatch, an important source of progressive commentary on the web; with Randy Fertel he developed the Ridenhour Prizes, which annually recognize whistleblowers, investigative reporters, and others who persevere in courageous acts of truth-telling; and with Victor Navasky he helped found Nation Books, which under Editor Carl Bromley and in association first with Avalon and then Perseus Books, grew into a leading independent non-fiction imprint. During these years, Fish also worked as a political advisor to George Soros, and with Jeffrey Kusama-Hinte he helped to develop a lobbying effort on behalf of US support for the International Criminal Court, an initiative that President Bill Clinton endorsed on the last day of December 2000. In 2009 and 2010, Fish assisted Lewis H. Lapham with development of the literary magazine Lapham's Quarterly.

At the invitation of The Nation's editor Katrina vanden Heuvel, Fish worked on the design and implementation of the year-long celebration of The Nation's 150th anniversary in 2015. Fish currently manages a strategic consulting practice for clients engaged in socially active businesses, including the Baffler Magazine and Audience Engine, the new open source platform that offers audience development and fundraising tools to independent and public media organizations.

=== Politics ===
After leaving The Nation magazine in 1987, Fish entered a three-way race for the Democratic nomination for the United States Congress in a Westchester County district held by Republican Representative Joseph DioGuardi. The national media took note of the race when his 100-year-old grandfather, Hamilton Fish III, described his grandson as a "communist" and contributed $100 to the Republican in the race. The elder Fish (1888–1991), himself a staunch Republican, served in Congress from the Hudson Valley from 1920–1945. Famously memorialized in Franklin D. Roosevelt's enduring refrain, "Martin, Barton, and Fish", a phrase used by FDR to deride his most persistent adversaries, the elder Fish was still active in conservative circles well into his late nineties. In 1988, the younger Fish lost in the closely contested primary to Nita Lowey, who went on to defeat the incumbent.

In 1994, his father, Hamilton Fish IV, announced his retirement from the United States Congress for health reasons. Fish again entered into a Democratic congressional primary, in the largely Republican mid-Hudson Valley district that his father had represented for 26 years. Fish won the Democratic primary, and although his father crossed party lines to endorse his son, he lost in the general election to Republican Sue Kelly.

=== Sexual harassment allegations at The New Republic ===
In February 2016, Fish was appointed publisher and editorial director of The New Republic after the magazine was purchased by Win McCormack.

On October 29, 2017, Fish began a leave of absence pending an independent investigation into complaints by female employees, according to a letter from McCormack sent to the magazine's staff. McCormack said he had asked Fish to "remain on a leave of absence", effective immediately after "having been made aware that a number of employees have come forward in the last few days to express concern about certain workplace interactions that have created an uncomfortable environment for them." McCormack further wrote. "As I understand them, these concerns relate specifically to interactions between Ham Fish and a number of women employees." On October 30, 2017, the Huffington Post published allegations that, in front of several witnesses, Fish had choked a senior staff member at The Nation Institute hard enough to leave red marks on her throat.

On November 3, 2017, Fish resigned from his various positions.

In a New York Times article from November 3, 2017, Fish was cited as writing in response, "As I understand it, some employees, to my deep dismay, complained this week that my presence had led them to feel uncomfortable at The New Republic." The article notes he added later, "It's my sense that our office culture has been harmed, and the best way for me to help the organization move past this is by withdrawing." In the letter Fish also stated, "Women have longstanding and profound concerns with respect to their treatment in the workplace. Many men have a lot to learn in this regard. I know I do."

=== Film ===
In 1975, Fish established a partnership with Marcel Ophuls, who had gained worldwide acclaim for The Sorrow and the Pity, his 1969 documentary on resistance and collaboration in Vichy France. Ophüls had been forcibly separated from his then current project, a film on the legacy of Nuremberg and its application to the American intervention in Vietnam. With the backing of California financier Max Palevsky and the support of Paramount Pictures, Fish embarked on a two-year odyssey to complete The Memory of Justice and to arrange its distribution. The four-hour-and-forty-minute film premiered at Cannes Film Festival in 1976, and appeared in the United States for the first time at the New York Film Festival later that same year. Writing in The New York Times, Vincent Canby declared that the film had set a new standard for documentaries, stating "...The Memory of Justice expands the possibilities of the documentary motion picture in such a way that all future films of this sort will be compared to it."

In 2011, Fish allied with the Film Foundation, the film restoration project headed by Martin Scorsese, to revive Ophuls' long-dormant masterpiece. The Film Foundation oversaw the reconstruction and digitization of the film and presented the premiere of the finished work at the Berlin Film Festival in February 2015. Fish and Ophuls, now 87, traveled to Berlin for the premiere, and Ophuls received the Festival's prestigious Berlinale Camera award. The Film Foundation has shepherded the restored documentary to festivals and screenings around the world, including a return visit to the 2015 New York Film Festival 39 years after the film's debut at the Lincoln Center venue.

In the 1980s, Fish renewed his association with Ophüls, and together with his producing partner, John Friedman, they commenced production of the third film in the Ophüls trilogy on the evolving legacy of the Holocaust. Hôtel Terminus: The Life and Times of Klaus Barbie would take several years to finish, as the filmmakers followed the trail of SS officer Klaus Barbie from his home in Bolivia to Lyon, France, where he was tried for crimes against humanity. The film was distributed domestically in 1988 by Samuel Goldwyn Films, and by Orion worldwide. Hotel Terminus received the 1989 Academy Award for Feature Documentary.

With John Friedman and Eric Nadler, Fish produced Stealing the Fire, the 2002 documentary that traced the development of uranium atom separation from the failed experiments in the World War II labs of Nazi Germany through the successful invention of the centrifuge in the Black Sea labs of the former Soviet Union, to the eventual patent infringement of the separation technology and its transfer to Pakistani and Iraqi agents. Stealing the Fire was distributed nationally in theaters by Avatar and broadcast on the Sundance Channel.

Fish served as a producer of Food Chains, the 2014 documentary by Sanjay Rawal about farm labor that focused in particular on the gains achieved by the Coalition of Immokalee Workers, the worker-based human rights organization representing tomato pickers in Florida. Food Chains helped spark a nationwide resurgence of advocacy around the workplace conditions and low wages of farm workers. Fish also developed the documentary Hot Type, for which he served as executive producer. Directed by two-time Academy Award winner Barbara Kopple, and released in 2015 in conjunction with the 150th anniversary of The Nation magazine, Hot Type goes behind the scenes at The Nation and examines the essential character of the independent journal.

=== Other organizations ===
Fish serves as president of the Alice Curtis Desmond and Hamilton Fish Library in Garrison, New York, and is on the board of the Fund for Constitutional Government, which develops and sustains organizations that protect and reinforce basic constitutional principles. Fish also serves as chair of the Board of Visitors of the School of Global Journalism and Communications at Morgan State University.

== Personal life ==
In 1989, Fish moved with his partner Sandra Harper to Hudson, New York, and started an organic truck farm, where they grew heirloom produce and culinary and decorative herbs. They sold these items at the Union Square Greenmarket and to restaurants and farm stands in Upstate New York. Fish also commuted several days a week to New York City where he worked at Human Rights Watch, under then-Executive Director Aryeh Neier. During this period, Fish was most prominently associated with the launch of the Human Rights Watch International Film Festival and the opening of HRW's European office in Brussels, Belgium. Their first child, Eliza, was born in 1991. In 1992, they moved to Garrison, New York, where Sophia, their second child, was born in 1993. Fish eventually moved his family to Lower Manhattan in 1997, where he entered his daughters in the local elementary school. The September 11 attacks on the World Trade Center forced Fish to move his family out of the city temporarily and back up the Hudson River to Garrison.

In 2005, Fish and his wife Sandra, who was raised in Houston, acquired an adobe home in Marfa, Texas. Harper developed another garden at this new location and went on to create Farm Stand Marfa, a regional farmers' market serving the towns and communities situated on the Marfa plateau. Fish partnered with Ballroom Marfa, a regional center for contemporary art and culture, to create the Marfa Dialogues, a cross-disciplinary program of politics, culture, and the arts, with programs in Marfa, New York City, St. Louis and Houston.
