= Coalition of Immokalee Workers =

American human rights organization

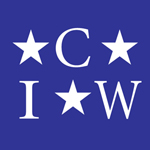
- Logo of the CIW
- Abbreviation: CIW
- Formation: 1993; 33 years ago
- Founded at: Immokalee, Florida
- Website: ciw-online.org

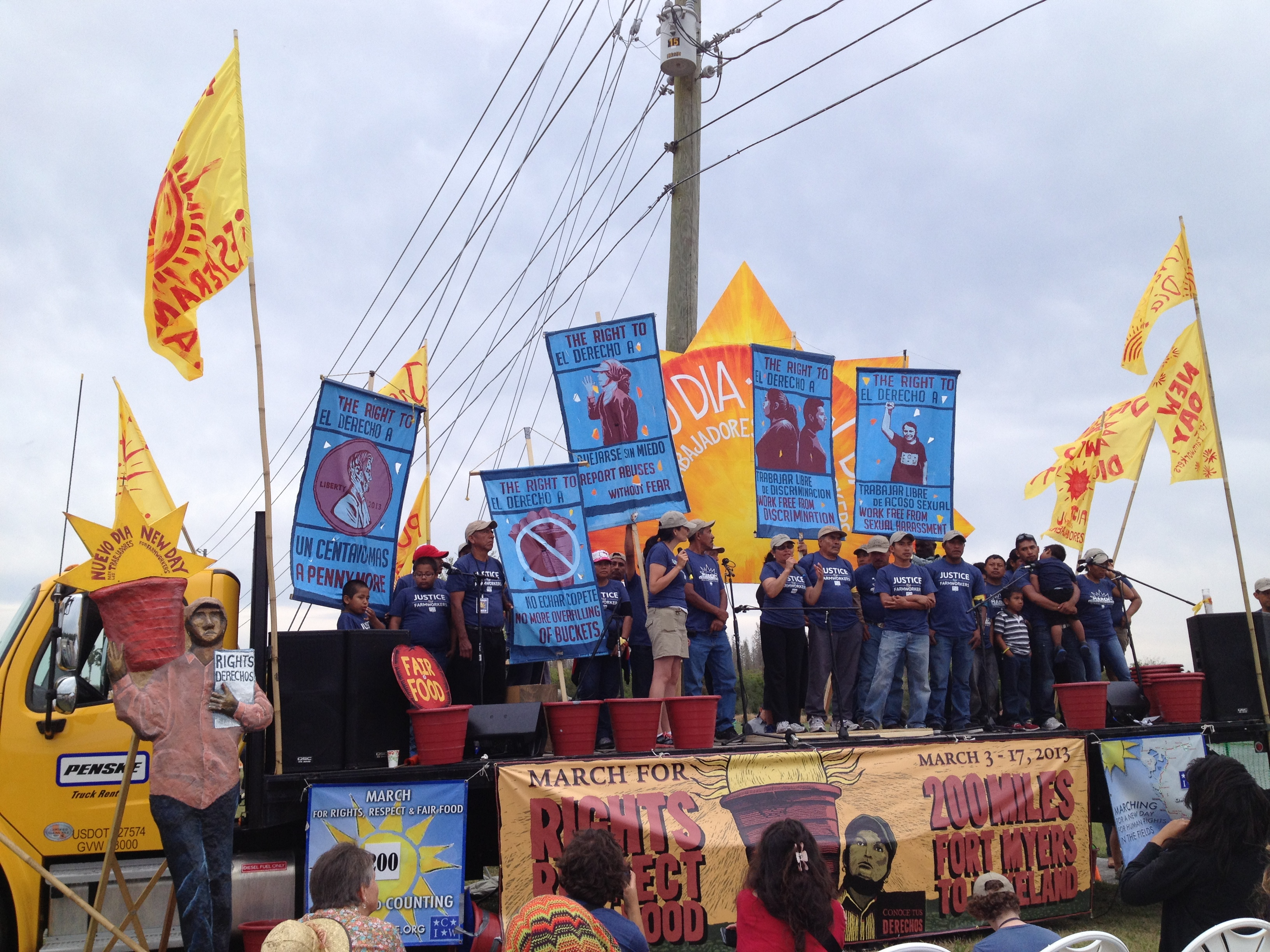
Farmworkers protests organized by the Coalition of Immokalee Workers

The Coalition of Immokalee Workers (CIW) is a worker-based human rights organization focusing on social responsibility in corporate supply chains, human trafficking, sexual violence at work and occupational health and safety.

Starting in 1993 from a foundation of farmworker community organizing in Immokalee, Florida, the CIW is best known today for its Fair Food Program (FFP), launched in 2011. The FFP harnesses the purchasing power of over a dozen retail food brands, from Taco Bell to Walmart, to compel compliance with a human rights-based code of conduct on participating farms. The Program was born in the Florida tomato industry and has spread to ten US states and Chile, including expansion into the cut flower industry and multiple additional crops, and incipient expansion efforts in South Africa and Mexico through the support of the US Department of Labor. A new channel for co-ops and smaller independent grocery stores to support the Program is expanding through the FFP Sponsor Program.

The FFP also gave rise to the Worker-driven social responsibility model (WSR), which has been successfully replicated in the apparel industry in Bangladesh through the Bangladesh Accord (now the International Accord), in Lesotho through the Lesotho Agreements, and in the dairy industry in the state of Vermont through the Milk with Dignity Program. The CIW provides technical assistance to organizations that are interested in adopting the WSR model through an umbrella organization, the WSR-Network.

Along with its campaigning and human rights enforcement efforts, CIW was a pioneer in the early days of the US anti-trafficking movement, uncovering several forced labor operations and collaborating with federal authorities in successful prosecutions in the 1990s. Since then, the CIW has continued its anti-slavery efforts, collaborating with law enforcement in more than a dozen domestic and transnational slavery prosecutions, helping to free thousands of workers from slavery operations in the Southeastern US, and training state and federal law enforcement officers in what has come to be known as the "victim-centered" approach to fighting human trafficking.

== Early actions in Florida agriculture ==
The CIW, initially called the Southwest Florida Farmworker Project, was formed in 1993 in Immokalee (Im-AH-ka-lee), Florida, a center of the state's billion-dollar fresh tomato industry. The group's organizing philosophy is based on principles of popular education and leadership development, as epitomized in CIW's motto "Consciousness + Commitment = Change".

Between 1995 and 2000, the CIW organized several major actions to protest declining real wages for tomato harvesters, as well as frequent violence from supervisors towards field workers. This period included community-wide work stoppages in 1995, 1997 and 1999; a 30-day hunger strike undertaken by six members in December, 1997– January,1998; and a 230-mile march from Ft. Myers to Orlando in 2000. By 1998, these protests "won industry-wide raises of 13-25% (an aggregate of several million dollars annually for the community in increased wages). Those raises brought the tomato picking piece rate back to pre-1980 levels (the piece rate had fallen below those levels over the course of the intervening two decades), but wages remained below poverty levels and continuing improvement was slow in coming."

In 2000, a change in strategy gradually emerged, from one that looked exclusively at the farm level, with a focus on abusive farm bosses and farm owners unwilling to consider workers' concerns, to an analysis that places much of the responsibility for degraded farm labor conditions at the feet of the multibillion-dollar retail food corporations. According to this analysis, retail food giants leverage their unprecedented volume purchasing power to drive prices down at the farm gate, where falling prices are translated into downward pressure on farmworkers' wages and working conditions by farms looking to maintain shrinking margins. The organization's focus then moved from growers to retail companies, to be pursued through the launch of a nation-wide campaign.

== Campaign for Fair Food ==
=== Winning a partnership with buyers ===
In 2001, the CIW declared a national boycott of Taco Bell, marking the launch of the Campaign for Fair Food. The Campaign's key slogan—"Taco Bell makes farmworkers poor"—captured the essence of the CIW's thinking: when major buyers such as Taco Bell leverage their volume purchasing power to demand discounts from their suppliers, they create strong downward pressure on wages and working conditions in these suppliers' operations.

A 2004 study by Oxfam America confirmed this trend: "Squeezed by the buyers of their produce, growers pass on the costs and risks imposed on them to those on the lowest rung of the supply chain: the farmworkers they employ."

During the Taco Bell Boycott, the CIW worked closely with religious and community groups and a student network, the Student/Farmworker Alliance, to pressure Taco Bell from different angles. The idea was that collaboration was built on a shared self-interest for desired change. For Immokalee farmworkers, that change was higher wages and improved working conditions. For their allies, the change was ethical consumption. From this foundation, a national consumer-network enlisting students, faith organizations, food and environmental justice advocates, and socially responsible investors formed to hold retail food industry brands accountable for human rights abuses in their produce supply chains.

On March 8, 2005, Yum! Brands, Inc., parent company of Taco Bell, agreed to all of the CIW's demands, including:

- The first-ever direct, ongoing payment by a fast-food industry leader to farmworkers in its supply chain to address sub-standard farm labor wages (nearly doubling the percentage of the final retail price that goes to the workers who pick the produce);
- The first-ever enforceable Code of Conduct for agricultural suppliers in the fast-food industry (which includes the CIW as part of the investigative body for monitoring worker complaints);
- Market incentives for agricultural suppliers willing to respect their workers' human rights, even when those rights are not guaranteed by law;
- 100% transparency for Taco Bell's tomato purchases in Florida.

After the Taco Bell Boycott, the Campaign for Fair Food shifted its focus to the rest of the fast-food industry. In response to the campaign, McDonald's helped create an industry-controlled code of conduct known as SAFE (Socially Accountable Farm Employers) that the CIW and its allies deemed insufficient. On April 9, 2007, an agreement between McDonald's and the CIW was announced at the Carter Center in Atlanta, Georgia. The agreement, which met the standards previously set by the Taco Bell accord, also included a commitment by McDonald's to work with the CIW to develop an industry-wide third-party mechanism to monitor conditions and investigate abuses in the fields.

In May 2008, at the U.S. Capitol, the CIW announced an agreement with Burger King. The world's second-largest burger chain had originally strongly opposed the campaign, even going so far as to hire a private investigative firm to provide information on the Student/Farmworker Alliance. As part of the announcement, Burger King's chief executive, John W. Chidsey, apologized for prior negative remarks directed towards the CIW and went on to praise the group's efforts. Subway, the largest fast-food buyer of Florida tomatoes, signed an agreement with the CIW six months later in December 2008. With this agreement, four of the world's largest fast-food companies were now supporting the campaign. The CIW and Chipotle Mexican Grill reached a Fair Food Agreement on October 4, 2012, after a six-year campaign by the CIW.

In September 2008, the CIW broke ground in the supermarket industry by signing an agreement with Whole Foods Market. Karen Christensen, a Whole Foods executive explained, "We commend the CIW for their advocacy on behalf of these workers. After carefully evaluating the situation in Florida, we felt that an agreement of this nature was in line with our core values and was in the best interest of the workers." The Whole Foods agreement marked the first time a retailer agreed to support the CIW initiative without extended public protests.

Throughout 2009 and 2010, the Student/Farmworker Alliance's "Dine with Dignity" campaign targeted the food service industry since many of these companies operate on college campuses. During this period, the CIW reached agreements with Bon Appétit Management Company, Compass Group, Aramark, and Sodexo.

In February 2012, the CIW and Trader Joe's "signed an agreement that formalizes the ways in which Trader Joe's will work with the CIW and Florida tomato growers to support the CIW's Fair Food Program." This was the first Fair Food agreement the CIW signed with a major food retailer in the aftermath of the 2010 breakthrough settlement with the Florida Tomato Growers Exchange.

In January 2014, Walmart, the largest grocery retailer in the U.S., announced it was joining the Fair Food Program. In its agreement with the CIW, Walmart committed to help expand the Fair Food Program outside of Florida and into crops other than tomatoes. Alexandra Guáqueta, chair of the UN Working Group on Business and Human Rights, attended the signing ceremony and conveyed a statement on behalf of the Working Group. The statement praises the Fair Food Program for its "smart mix" of monitoring and enforcement tools, including "market incentives for growers and retailers, monitoring policies and, crucially, a robust and accessible mechanism to resolve complaints and provide remedy," adding, "Workers have no fear of retaliation if they identify problems." The statement concludes, "We are eager to see whether the Fair Food Program is able to leverage further change within participating businesses, and serve as a model elsewhere in the world."

In 2015, the CIW signed Fair Food Agreements with The Fresh Market and Ahold (parent company of Giant and Stop & Shop).

The Campaign for Fair Food is currently focused on Wendy's, in addition to several supermarket chains who remain uncommitted to the Fair Food Program, including Publix and Kroger. In March 2023, a group of around 100 farm workers launched a protest march across Florida to pressure both Publix and Kroger to join the Fair Food Program, and to highlight their deplorable working conditions, including forced labor.

The CIW innovative campaigning strategy has not gone unchallenged. For instance, in November 2017, the Center for Union Facts filed a complaint with the Internal Revenue Service asserting the CIW "does not serve the public at large but instead a group of workers seeking concessions from their employers." The union watchdog requested that "the IRS examine CIW's Forms 990 for 2013, 2014, and 2015, and, if appropriate, revoke its tax-exempt status." The complaint was investigated by the Trump Administration Department of Labor and ultimately dismissed.

=== Winning a Partnership with Growers ===
In November 2007, the Florida Tomato Growers Exchange (FTGE), an agricultural cooperative that provides its grower members with limited antitrust protection for marketing their products, announced that the Taco Bell/Yum and McDonald's deals "will not be executed and now are considered moot." Citing antitrust concerns, the FTGE threatened its members with $100,000 (~$145,316 in 2024) fines for cooperating with McDonald's or Yum Brands. One month later, FTGE Vice President Reggie Brown explained, "I think it is un-American when you get people outside your business to dictate terms of business to you." As a result of the FTGE's resistance, the penny-per-pound funds accrued during the stalemate were held in escrow.

On April 15, 2008, the United States Senate Committee on Health, Education, Labor, and Pensions (HELP) held hearings on "Ending Abuses and Improving Working Conditions for Tomato Workers" in which Reggie Brown claimed farmworkers earned an average wage of "between $10.50 and $14.86 per hour." Lucas Benitez of the CIW and Senators Bernie Sanders (VT-I) and Dick Durbin (IL-D) disputed Brown's claim by citing contradictory evidence. The senators also scrutinized the legal basis for the FTGE's resistance to the Campaign for Fair Food.

In November 2010, an agreement was reached between the CIW and the Florida Tomato Growers Exchange to implement the Fair Food Program – "including a strict code of conduct, a cooperative complaint resolution system, a participatory health and safety program, and a worker-to-worker education process – to over 90% of the Florida tomato industry". Workers could receive an increase in annual wages from $10,000–12,000 a year to $17,000 if additional large buyers agree to the increase. In an editorial, the New York Times described the agreement as a "remarkable victory in a 15-year struggle for better pay and working conditions... The Immokalee victory won't impose fairness overnight, but after generations of exploitation, part of the farm industry is pointing in the right direction."

=== Timeline ===
| Year | Date | Event |
|---|---|---|
| 2005 | March 8 | Agreement reached with Yum! Brands (Taco Bell) |
| 2007 | April 9 | Agreement reached with McDonald's |
| 2008 | May 17 | Agreement reached with Burger King |
| 2008 | September 9 | Agreement reached with Whole Foods Market |
| 2008 | December 2 | Agreement reached with Subway |
| 2009 | April 29 | Agreement reached with Bon Appétit Management Company |
| 2009 | September 25 | Agreement reached with Compass Group |
| 2010 | April 1 | Agreement reached with Aramark |
| 2010 | August 24 | Agreement reached with Sodexo |
| 2012 | February 9 | Agreement reached with Trader Joe's |
| 2012 | October 4 | Agreement reached with Chipotle Mexican Grill |
| 2014 | January 16 | Agreement reached with Walmart |
| 2015 | January 8 | Agreement reached with The Fresh Market |
| 2015 | July 29 | Agreement reached with Ahold |

== Fair Food Program ==
=== Structure and functions ===
The Fair Food Program is a human rights monitoring and enforcement program designed to protect farmworkers' fundamental human rights on participating farms by harnessing the purchasing power of more than a dozen of the world's largest retail food brands. The CIW's Fair Food Agreements with major food retailers provide for the enforcement of the Fair Food Code of Conduct through a multi-layered approach to monitoring and enforcement that features a 24/7 complaint investigation and resolution mechanism and comprehensive field and office audits.

The CIW's legally-binding agreements with participating buyers include two primary provisions: the Fair Food Premium—a bonus paid by the retailers and distributed directly to farmworkers on top of their regular pay, to help improve longstanding poverty-level wages in the US agricultural sector—and the market-backed enforcement of the Fair Food Code of Conduct, through the suspension of purchases by the Participating Buyers from farms that have committed zero tolerance (e.g., forced labor) violations or else failed to remediate other violations (e.g., wage theft). Workers on participating farms receive multiple forms of education on their rights under the Fair Food Code of Conduct, including written and video education at the point of hire and at least two in-person, worker-to-worker educations, on the farm and on the clock, administered by a CIW worker education team per season.

Working in a spirit of partnership with brands and growers, CIW and grower representatives regularly meet and collaborate to revise the Code and resolve concerns over its implementation. For instance, in the face of rising heat-related health risks due to the effects of climate change, the Code has recently been updated to include mandatory breaks every two hours, increased monitoring of heat-stress prevention measures, education and training, and responding to heat-stress symptoms. Another example of how new standards are developed to timely address emerging challenges is the "FFP COVID-19 Illness Prevention, Assessment and Response Plan". These protocols became effective in September 2020 and were the first set of privately enforceable mandatory standards to protect farmworkers from COVID-19 in the U.S.

The Fair Food Standards Council, an independent monitor set up by the CIW to monitor Code compliance, administers the 24/7 complaint hotline, provides ongoing third-party monitoring and annual auditing (including interviews with over half the workforce on-site), as well as ongoing reviews and payroll and timekeeping systems to ensure that there is no wage theft and that the Fair Food Premium is distributed properly on top of regular wages. The Fair Food Standards Council is based in Sarasota, Florida, and directed by a former New York State Supreme Court Justice.

Corrective action plans are the building blocks for improving supplier compliance with the Code. Audit reports and complaint findings serve as the starting point for a conversation. The corrective action plans that follow are co-created with farms to address their unique circumstances. This contributes to supplier buy-in, as does the independent monitor's experience, and the efficiency gains from having a clear plan that sets priorities and realistic timelines for achieving them. The entire process is backed by the possibility of market consequences for the failure or refusal to comply with the requirements of the corrective action plan.

Complaint resolutions closes the circle by providing for ongoing monitoring and enforcement. The independent monitor improves communication through effective and efficient resolution of workers' complaints, free of retaliation, which in turn builds trust in the system and encourages workers to come forward.

With its worker-centered approach to human rights monitoring and enforcement, the Fair Food Program was the first comprehensive, fully functional model of the Worker-driven Social Responsibility (WSR) paradigm. The Fair Food Standards Council recently released its 2021 Fair Food Program report, which includes updated statistics regarding the impact of the program along with education and training for farmworkers to use at their jobs.

=== The Fair Food Sponsor Program ===
The FFP Sponsor Program is a new entry point for smaller retailers who aspire to support ethical practices, meet the expectations of a committed shopper base, and help build a more just food system. Sponsors make three commitments under the program:

– making an annual support payment to the Fair Food Program based on a sliding scale,

– educating their customers about the Fair Food Program through the announcement of the partnership and material making an effort to source Fair Food Program produce if it is available to them from their distributors.

The Sponsor Program has the potential to maximize the industry power of smaller food retailers to preserve the gains that the FFP has achieved for workers in the US tomato industry and reduce the almost exclusive reliance on the industry power of corporate buyers as the source of the FFP supplier incentives for decent work.

Currently, the Program includes three co-ops, one independent retailer and one restaurant – respectively, Takoma Park Silver Spring Co-Op (Maryland), Park Slope Food Coop (N.Y.C.), Three Rivers Market (Tennessee), Each Peach Market (D.C.) and The Trashy Vegan (Tennessee).

=== Program Expansion ===
The Program is steadily expanding to new sectors and new states. In 2020, the Program expanded to the cut flower industry in Virginia, California, and, since 2022, in Chile. The Program is planning further international expansion to South Africa and Mexico through support of the US Department of Labor.

== Anti-Slavery Campaign ==
The CIW has developed an internationally recognized "worker-based approach to eliminating modern-day slavery in the agricultural industry. The CIW helps fight this crime by uncovering, investigating, and assisting in the federal prosecution of slavery rings preying on hundreds of farmworkers. In such situations, captive workers are held against their will by their employers through threats and, all too often, the actual use of violence – including beatings, shootings, and pistol-whippings."

The CIW is a founding member of the national Freedom Network U.S.A to Empower Victims of Slavery and Trafficking. Additionally, the CIW is a regional coordinator for the Freedom Network Training Institute on Human Trafficking (FNTI). In this capacity, the CIW trains state and federal law enforcement and NGOs on how to identify and assist people held in slavery operations.

Other selected anti-slavery partnerships and collaborations include:

- Legislature-appointed member, Florida Statewide Task Force on Human Trafficking
- Florida Dept. of Law Enforcement (FDLE), curriculum for Advanced Investigative Techniques in Human Trafficking
- Collier County Sheriff's Department Anti-Trafficking Unit
- US Attorney's Anti-Trafficking Task Forces, Tampa and Miami districts
- Federal Bureau of Investigation (F.B.I), Supervisory Special Agents In-Service trainings
- North Carolina State Troopers Training Academy, training
- U.S. Department of Justice, Civil Rights Division, Anti-Trafficking Unit, Washington, DC

In 2010, the CIW developed a mobile Florida Modern-Day Slavery Museum that has extensively toured the southern and eastern U.S.

== Organizing beyond working conditions ==
One of the CIW's first accomplishments was to establish a cooperative to sell staple foods and other necessities at cost in order to combat price gouging by local merchants. CIW has owned and operated WCIW-LP (107.7 FM, "Radio Conciencia"), a low-power FM radio station that features music, news, and educational programming in several languages, since 2004. The station has served as a vital emergency services information hub during the state's many hurricanes over the past two decades. Most recently, during the COVID-19 pandemic, the Radio helped raise awareness about the virus, prevention and good practices, as well as information about available health services established by the CIW in partnership with Doctors Without Borders, Partners in Health, and other organizations. Recent scientific evidence shows how CIW's community-building efforts proved crucial to increasing trust and improve the response of the local health system to a devastating pandemic.

Following the killing of an unarmed farmworker, Nicholas Morales Besanilla, who was fatally shot by a Collier County Sheriff's deputy on September 17, 2020, CIW launched the "Justice for Nicolas" campaign. Decrying rising police brutality across the country, the campaign specifically asked for a federal investigation into Nicholas's shooting, the implementation of accessible crisis response teams across the county, and increased transparency.

As part of its engagement with the Immokalee community, CIW has long attempted to alleviate the dire housing conditions farmworkers have to endure, often having little choice but to live in crowded, over-priced, and even dangerous trailers. These efforts increased following Hurricane Irma in 2017, which further aggravated the housing situation. Today, CIW representatives sit in the board of the Immokalee Fair Housing Alliance, a nonprofit with the mission to build affordable housing for 128 families.

== Broader impact ==
The efforts by the Immokalee workers was cited as inspiration for the Centro de Trabajadores Unidos en la Lucha (CTUL), the Minneapolis union of construction workers, in the creation of an independent monitoring program aimed at cracking down on labor abuses in the construction industry. That independent monitor, Building Dignity and Respect also signed an agreement in 2025 to begin inspecting work site in Vermont.

== Awards and recognition ==
The CIW has received honors and recognition including:

- 2006 – Paul and Sheila Wellstone Award, Freedom Network USA, for outstanding contributions to combating human trafficking and modern-day slavery in the U.S.
- 2007 – Anti-Slavery Award, Anti-Slavery International of London (world's oldest human rights organization) for exceptional contribution towards tackling modern-day slavery in the U.S. agricultural industry.
- 2008 – Sister Margaret Cafferty Development of People Award, Catholic Campaign for Human Development.
- 2010 – Adela Dwyer-St. Thomas of Villanova Peace Award, Villanova University, Center for Peace & Justice Education.
- 2010 – People of the Year, Fort Myers (FL) News-Press, in recognition of the CIW's "years of groundbreaking advocacy" and "landmark efforts, which have far-ranging implications beyond Southwest Florida."
- 2010 – Hero Acting to End Modern-Day Slavery Award, U.S. Department of State awarded to CIW Co-Founder, Laura Germino, for her "perseverance against slavery operations in the U.S. agricultural industry and determination to eliminate forced labor in supply chains". The award was given to Laura Germino on the occasion of the State Department's release of the 10th annual Trafficking in Persons (TIP) report, which for the first time included the United States in its rankings.
- 2012 – Growing Green Award, Natural Resources Defense Council, for leaders and innovators in the field of sustainable food and agriculture.
- 2013 – Franklin D. Roosevelt Four Freedoms Awards, Freedom from Want Medal, Roosevelt Institute, in recognition of creating "a sustainable blueprint for worker-driven corporate social responsibility, winning fairer wages; work with dignity; and freedom from forced labor, sexual harassment, and violence in the workplace"
- 2014 – Clinton Global Citizen Award, Clinton Global Initiative, in recognition of the Fair Food Program as "a breakthrough, worker-driven approach to verifiable corporate accountability recognized by the United Nations and the White House for its unique effectiveness."
- 2015 – Presidential Medal for Extraordinary Efforts to Combat Human Trafficking in Persons, "by pioneering the Fair Food Program, empowering agricultural workers, and leveraging market forces and consumer awareness to promote supply chain transparency and eradicate modern slavery on participating farms."
- 2017 – MacArthur Genius Fellowship awarded to CIW Co-Founder, Greg Asbed, for pioneering a "visionary strategy… with potential to transform workplace environments across the global supply chain"
- 2018 – ALBA/Puffin Award for Human Rights Activism from the Puffin Foundation and the Abraham Lincoln Brigades Archives. "In support of their continued efforts to protect the rights of agricultural workers, prevent involuntary servitude, and create a food supply chain that is fair from bottom to top."
- 2022 – The American Bar Association's 2022 Frances Perkins Public Service Award, in recognition of CIW's vital decades-long fight for the dignities of agricultural workers and its impact on harnessing legal and market forces to bring about change.

The Fair Food Program was the subject of a feature-length, front-page article in The New York Times on April 24, 2014. In this article Janice Fine, a labor relations professor at Rutgers University stated, ""This is the best workplace-monitoring program I've seen in the U.S.... It can certainly be a model for agriculture across the U.S. If anybody is going to lead the way and teach people how it's done, it's them." In the same article, Susan Marquis, dean of the Pardee Rand Graduate School commented on the FFP's effectiveness, noting, "When I first visited Immokalee, I heard appalling stories of abuse and modern slavery... But now the tomato fields in Immokalee are probably the best working environment in American agriculture. In the past three years, they've gone from being the worst to the best." The CIW recently released its 2021 Fair Food Program report, which includes updated statistics regarding the impact of the program along with education and training for farmworkers to use at their jobs.

Further expressions of praise for the Program include:

- President Jimmy Carter echoed this conclusion in a public letter to the CIW from July 2013, stating, "You have formed innovative partnerships to find common ground between diverse interests, including some of the poorest workers in the United States and their employers, supply chain companies, retailers, consumers and law enforcement. My hope is that this will become a model for social responsibility within the agricultural industry."
- After a year-long investigation of sexual assault in the fields from California to Florida, a PBS Frontline producer declared the Fair Food Program to be the single most effective prevention program in the U.S. agricultural industry.
- A delegation from the United Nations Working Group on Business and Human Rights toured the U.S. on a mission to "explore practices, challenges and lessons relating to efforts on implementing" the United Nations Guiding Principles on Business and Human Rights. The delegation visited with several Fair Food Program stakeholders as part of its broader investigation. While the Working Group found numerous shortcomings in the response of U.S. businesses generally to human rights issues, it left "impressed" with the Fair Food Program specifically, praising the FFP for "innovatively address[ing] core worker concerns" and "governance gaps relating to labour issues" through "market incentives for participating growers" and an "independent and robust enforcement mechanism."
- The White House Office of Faith-Based and Neighborhood Partnerships singled out the Fair Food Program in a major 2013 report as one of the "most successful and innovative programs" in the world today to uncover and prevent modern-day slavery.
- An April 2021 policy brief produced by ReStructure Lab, a collaboration among Yale University, Stanford University, and Sheffield University (UK), concluded that "binding worker-driven social responsibility agreements," complete with third-party monitoring, are the most promising avenue for fighting forced labor in supply chains".
- In 2022, a Harvard-based policy consortium calls on Congress, US Department of Agriculture to help drive expansion of FFP and other WSR initiatives in agriculture, stressing that "By incentivizing the growth of WSR [Worker-driven Social Responsibility] initiatives and focusing attention at the "top" of the supply chain—specifically, by preferentially providing the many forms of financial support government provides to those farms that join WSR programs—Congress can advance the twin aims of ending working exploitation and supporting the diversity and vibrancy of the farming sector."
- In 2022, the United Nations Forum on Business and Human Rights featured a session on the WSR-model and the success of the Fair Food Program as a leading example of governance initiatives for centering rights holders in the business and human rights space.

== See also ==
- Food Chains, a 2014 documentary about the Coalition of Immokalee Workers.
- Workers' self-management
- Agriculture in Florida
