= WCTI =

WCTI may refer to:

- WCTI-TV, a television station (channel 10, virtual 12) licensed to serve New Bern, North Carolina, United States
- WCIW-LP, a radio station (107.9 FM) licensed to serve Immokalee, Florida, United States, which used the call sign WCTI-LP from December 2003 to January 2004
