= Greg Asbed =

American activist and labor organizer

- Born: Baltimore, Maryland
- Education: Brown University; Johns Hopkins University
- Known for: Coalition of Immokalee Workers
- Awards: MacArthur Fellow

Greg Asbed is an American activist, labor organizer, and human rights strategist. He is the co-founder of the Coalition of Immokalee Workers, a worker-based human rights organization based in Immokalee, Florida, working to eradicate modern slavery in the Floridian agriculture industry. In 2017 Asbed was named a MacArthur Fellow for "transforming conditions for low-wage workers with a visionary model of worker-driven social responsibility."

== Early life and education ==
Asbed is a first-generation Armenian American; his grandmother, Hripsimee, is survivor of the Armenian genocide who was forced into Syria. In a 2017 interview, Asbed connected this fact to his human rights work, stating "I have always felt a certain responsibility, as a bearer of DNA that was forged in the crucible of genocide, to the idea of universal human rights."

Asbed was born in Baltimore and raised in the suburbs of Washington, D.C. His father immigrated to the United States from Kobane to study nuclear physics; his mother is a pediatrician at Johns Hopkins Hospital.

Asbed attended the Landon School and enrolled at Brown University. At Brown he studied neuroscience, graduating with a Bachelor of Science in 1985. After college he spent three years in Haiti where he learned Haitian Creole and became involved with a peasant movement. Upon returning to the U.S., Asbed pursued graduate study at Johns Hopkins University, where he received a Master of Arts degree in 1990.

== Coalition of Immokalee Workers ==
After working with laborers in Pennsylvania and Maryland, Asbed and his wife moved to Immokalee, Florida, in 1991. Working with farmworkers, they established the Coalition of Immokalee Workers; at the time of its establishment, the group was one of the nation's first centers dedicated to aiding migrant workers. At CIW, Asbed led the development of the Fair Food Program through which companies could pay a small premium for crop purchases in exchange for a commitment from growers to abide by a code of conduct relating to wages and working conditions; participating companies must agree to drop suppliers who violate the standards. As of 2017, 90% of tomato growers in Florida participate in the program. The Fair Food Program has been hailed for its success in combating modern slavery in Southwest Florida and hailed as an exemplary paradigm for improving the rights of farmworkers.
