= Challenging Impossibility =

- Directed by: Natabara Rollosson and Sanjay Rawal
- Produced by: Sanjay Rawal, Mridanga Spencer and Natabara Rollosson
- Cinematography: Sanjay Rawal
- Edited by: Sanjay Rawal
- Music by: Parichayaka Hammerl
- Release date: April 22, 2011
- Running time: 28 minutes
- Country: United States
- Language: English

Challenging Impossibility is a 2011 documentary film which chronicles the weightlifting odyssey of the spiritual teacher Sri Chinmoy, who in 1985 at the age of 54 took up weightlifting and performing feats of strength using the power of meditation. His lifts were featured on newscasts worldwide, inspiring people to transcend their personal limitations and to abandon their concepts of the restrictions of physical age. Directed by Natabara Rollosson and Sanjay Rawal. The film was an Official Selection of the 2011 Tribeca Film Festival and premiered April 22, 2011.

== Synopsis ==
The subject of Challenging Impossibility is the weightlifting odyssey of Sri Chinmoy, a spiritual teacher who came from India to live in New York City and began lifting weights at the age of 54. The film features news footage and interviews with bodybuilders, strongmen, olympians, and biomechanics experts. The film follows a historical narrative that builds upon a public display of strength that Sri Chinmoy performed in 2004 at York College.

Starting out with basic dumbbells (40 lbs) in 1985, Sri Chinmoy quickly progressed to lift cars, planes and elephants in an effort to show how meditation can develop inner peace that can translate to tangible outer power and strength. Along Chinmoy’s journey of “self-transcendence” he honored and inspired individuals who have uplifted humanity by literally lifting them on a platform above the head in an award program titled "Lifting Up the World with a Oneness-Heart". From its creating in 1987, Sri Chinmoy lifted over 7000 people, including Nelson Mandela, Desmond Tutu Muhammad Ali, Sting, Eddie Murphy, Susan Sarandon, Roberta Flack, Yoko Ono, Jeff Goldblum, and Richard Gere.

Chinmoy’s training culminated when he held a public demonstration of his feats of strength at age 73 in the presence of strength experts such as 5-time Mr. Universe Bill Pearl, 3-time Mr. Olympia Frank Zane, 2002 World’s Strongest Man Hugo Girard and 9-time Olympic Gold-Medalist Carl Lewis. In the film, Lewis described how when Sri Chinmoy lifted weights, “It’s like gravity stops”. Chinmoy’s lifts were featured on newscasts worldwide on outlets such as CNN, CNN International, ABC, NBC, CBS, Fox, and numerous local affiliates. Chinmoy performed his own strenuous feats to spread his message of world harmony and inner peace, to inspire people to transcend their personal limitations and to abandon their concepts of the restrictions of physical age. Appearances in the film also include Mikhail Gorbachev, Pope John Paul II, Mother Teresa, and Princess Diana.

== Premiere ==
The film premiered at the 2011 Tribeca Film Festival in New York on April 22, 2011, in a new bracket of inspiring short documentaries in which "positive thinking prevails". At the premier, Carl Lewis described how Sri Chinmoy encouraged him to transcend his own personal limitations. "Sri Chinmoy inspired me, and he's followed my career, actually he's one of the few people that had been to all four of my Olympic Games...when you were in his presence it was always positive, you never heard anything negative, he was always inspiring you to be better than yourself and think about other people." Also in attendance for the premier were Frank Zane, Hugo Girard, Nadine Tremblay, and Wayne DeMilia, who all appear in the film.

== Exhibit ==
A pop-up exhibition of Chinmoy’s weightlifting equipment that appeared in the film. The exhibit coincided with the premier of the film in Tribeca from April 15 to May 2, 2011.

On display were numerous custom-made machines, such as a standing calf raise machine which Sri Chinmoy used to set a record of lifting 2,400 pounds, "the equivalent of lifting an elevator packed full of people". Among the machines was also the apparatus Sri Chinmoy used to lift people in his "Lifting Up the World with a Oneness-Heart" program, which he used to honor individuals of inspiration by lifting them overhead on a platform.
