= Hamilton Fish IV =

American politician (1926–1996)

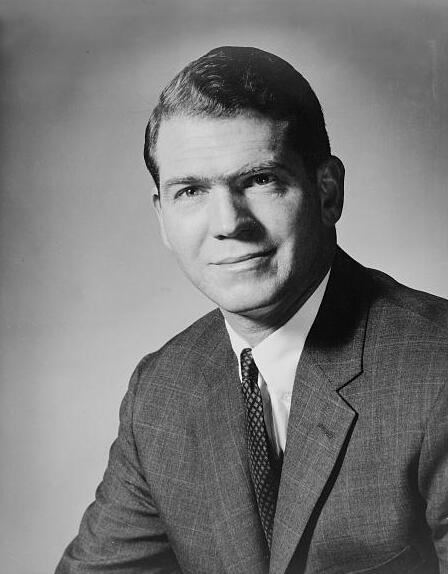
- Fish in 1968

Member of the U.S. House of Representatives from New York
- In office January 3, 1969 – January 3, 1995
- Preceded by: Joseph Y. Resnick
- Succeeded by: Sue W. Kelly
- Constituency: 28th district (1969–1973); 25th district (1973–1983); 21st district (1983–1993); 19th district (1993–1995)

Personal details
- Born: June 3, 1926 Washington, D.C., U.S.
- Died: July 23, 1996 (aged 70) Washington, D.C., U.S.
- Party: Republican
- Spouses: Julia MacKenzie (m. 1951; died 1969) Billy Laster Cline (m. 1971; died 1985) Mary Ann Tinklepaugh (m. 1988)
- Children: 4, including Hamilton V and Nick
- Parent(s): Grace Chapin; Hamilton Fish III
- Relatives: Fish family
- Education: Kent School
- Alma mater: Harvard University (AB); New York University (LLB)

Military service
- Allegiance: United States of America
- Branch/service: United States Navy Reserve
- Years of service: 1944–1946
- Hamilton Fish IV's voice Fish speaks on the Civil Rights Act of 1991; Recorded November 7, 1991

Hamilton Fish IV or Hamilton Fish Jr. (June 3, 1926 – July 23, 1996) was an American Republican politician who represented parts of New York's Hudson Valley region in the United States House of Representatives for thirteen terms from 1969 to 1995. Fish was a member of the prominent Fish political family; his grandfather (Hamilton Fish II) and father (Hamilton Fish III), both also named Hamilton, represented the region from 1909 to 1911 and 1920 to 1945, respectively.

== Early life ==
Fish was born in Washington, D.C., the son of Grace Chapin and Hamilton Fish III (1888–1991). His grandfathers were Hamilton Fish II (1849–1936) and Alfred C. Chapin, who were both lawyers and politicians. He was a great-grandson of Hamilton Fish (1808–1893), and a descendant of Lewis Morris and John Kean.

He graduated from Kent School in 1944 and Harvard College in 1949. He received an LL.B. from the New York University School of Law in 1957. He also attended Harvard Kennedy School. While in college, Fish was a member of the United States Naval Reserve from 1944 to 1946.

== Career ==
From 1951 to 1953, Fish served with the United States Foreign Service and was posted as vice consul to Ireland. He practiced law privately before his election to the House, and in 1961, Fish served as a lawyer for the New York State Assembly's Judiciary Committee.

=== U.S. Congress ===
Fish was a candidate for the 90th Congress in 1966. While he won the Republican primary, he was defeated in the general election by Democrat Joseph Y. Resnick. In the 1968 Republican primary, he defeated G. Gordon Liddy, and went on to win in the general election that year. He served in the 91st United States Congress, and was re-elected to the 12 succeeding Congresses, serving from January 3, 1969, to January 3, 1995.

As a member of the U.S. House Committee on the Judiciary in 1974, he voted in favor of the first two of the three articles of impeachment (for obstruction of justice and abuse of power) of President Richard Nixon during the impeachment process against Nixon.

Fish twice served as a House impeachment manager, being among those who successfully prosecuted the cases against Judges Harry E. Claiborne and Alcee Hastings in their impeachment trials.

== Personal life ==
In 1951, Fish was married to Julia MacKenzie (1927–1969), who was born in Montreal, Quebec, and was the daughter of Ellice MacKenzie. Together, they were the parents of:

- Hamilton Fish V (born 1952), who ran for Congress in 1988 and 1994 as a Democrat without success. He is married to Sandra Harper.
- Julia Alexandria "Alexa" Fish (born 1953), who married Thomas Ward, a descendant of Samuel Gray Ward.
- Nicholas Stuyvesant Fish (1958–2020), also a Democrat who was chairman of Manhattan Community Board 5. Member of the Portland City Council 2008–2020.
- Peter Livingston Fish (born 1959)

After Julia's death in a car accident in 1969, he married Billy Laster Cline (1924–1985), the daughter of Mayne E. Laster (1903–1972), a cattle rancher, and Mildred (née Greenwood) Laster (1912–1987), in 1971. They remained married until her death in 1985. In 1988, he married Mary Ann Tinklepaugh (b. 1930), a Deputy Assistant Secretary of Commerce in the Reagan and Bush administrations.

A heavy smoker, Fish retired from Congress in 1994, after being diagnosed with lung cancer and prostate cancer. He died from cancer at his home in Washington, D.C., on July 23, 1996, at the age of 70.

== See also ==
- List of members of the American Legion

U.S. House of Representatives
Preceded by Joseph Y. Resnick	Member of the U.S. House of Representatives from New York's 28th congressional district 1969–1973	Succeeded by Samuel S. Stratton
Preceded by Peter A. Peyser	Member of the U.S. House of Representatives from New York's 25th congressional district 1973–1983	Succeeded by Sherwood Boehlert
Preceded by Robert García	Member of the U.S. House of Representatives from New York's 21st congressional district 1983–1993	Succeeded by Michael McNulty
Preceded by Eliot Engel	Member of the U.S. House of Representatives from New York's 19th congressional district 1993–1995	Succeeded by Sue W. Kelly
Preceded by Robert McClory	Ranking Member of the House Judiciary Committee; 1983–1995	Succeeded by John Conyers
