= Louis Dubose =

American journalist

Louis Dubose is an American journalist. He has been the editor of the independent political periodical The Washington Spectator since 2007. Under Dubose's editorship, the Spectator has covered Washington politics and dateline stories from places around the United States ranging from Helena, Montana, to Shelby County, Alabama, to Port Arthur, Texas. Dubose has written a number of high-profile articles for the Spectator, including a June 2013 report that broke the story of the potential toxicity of consumer plastics used in baby bottles and cups and an interview with a former Guantanamo inmate, Murat Kurnaz.

He has been interviewed on news programs such as 60 Minutes, NOW with Bill Moyers, The Rachel Maddow Show, Democracy Now! with Amy Goodman, Fresh Air, PoliticsNation with Al Sharpton, and The O'Reilly Factor.

Dubose has also been the author and co-author of several books focusing on extremism in the Republican Party, including one on former Republican Majority Leader Tom DeLay, and two on the political life and presidency of George W. Bush, among others. Shrub, the Short but Happy Political Life of George W. Bush, which Dubose wrote in collaboration with the late Molly Ivins, was a New York Times best seller.

== Biography ==
Dubose has covered American politics since he began writing for The Texas Observer in the early 1980s. In the early 2000s he worked as the politics editor for The Austin Chronicle. In the spring of 2007, he was hired as the editor of The Washington Spectator by the publisher at the time, Kevin Walter, who said that the Spectator chose Dubose for "his skills as an editor, but also his hard-nosed background as a reporter" and for his "unique perspective" on "Texas politicians."

Dubose divides his time between Austin, Texas and Washington, D.C.

== Published works ==
- Bill of Wrongs: The Executive Branch's Assault on America's Fundamental Rights with Molly Ivins (Random House, 2007) ISBN 1-4000-6286-1
- Vice: Dick Cheney and the Hijacking of the American Presidency with Jake Bernstein (Random House, 2006) ISBN 1-4000-6576-3
- The Hammer: Tom DeLay: God, Money, and the Rise of the Republican Congress with Jan Reid (Public Affairs, 2004) ISBN 1-5864-8238-6
- Boy Genius: Karl Rove, the Brains Behind the Remarkable Political Triumph of George W. Bush with Jan Reid and Carl M. Cannon (Public Affairs, 2003) ISBN 1-5864-8192-4
- Bushwhacked: Life in George W. Bush's America with Molly Ivins (Random House, 2003) ISBN 0-375-50752-3
- Shrub: The Short but Happy Political Life of George W. Bush with Molly Ivins (Random House, 2000) ISBN 0-375-50399-4
