= Gather (film) =

2020 documentary film

- Directed by: Sanjay Rawal
- Produced by: Sanjay Rawal; Tanya Meillier; Sterlin Harjo
- Music by: Michael A. Levine
- Production company: Illumine Group
- Distributed by: Monument Releasing
- Release date: September 8, 2020 (United States)
- Running time: 74 minutes
- Country: United States
- Language: English

Gather is a 2020 American documentary film about Native American efforts for food sovereignty, directed by Sanjay Rawal and released in 2020. The film follows efforts by various people and groups to reclaim ancestral foodways. It was positively reviewed by critics, and named a Critic's Pick by The New York Times in September 2020.

== Synopsis ==
Gather follows attempts by Native Americans to reclaim the foodways of their ancestors. The documentary opens with a quote from Crazy Horse:

The Red Nation shall rise again and it shall be a blessing for a sick world; a world filled with broken promises, selfishness and separations; a world longing for light again.

Chef Nephi Craig works to start Café Gozhóó, a restaurant that will serve traditional Apache food and train people recovering from addiction to cook it. Fred DuBray and his daughter Elsie DuBray work with bison in the Cheyenne River Lakota Nation, while the Ancestral Guard made up of Sammy Gensaw III and other Yurok men in Northern California practice and teach their tribe's traditional practices for fishing and preparing salmon on the Klamath River. Twila Cassadore studies and shares about the historical agricultural practices of the San Carlos Apache, White Mountain Apache, and Yavapai peoples.

== Production ==
Gather was directed by Sanjay Rawal and co-produced by the First Nations Development Institute. The executive producer was Jason Momoa, additional producers included Tanya Meillier and Sterlin Harjo, and the cinematographer was Renan Ozturk.

During the production process for Gather, the team producing the film sought grants which they used to hire Native American journalists (including Kim Baca) as well as photographers; they were charged with producing stories for media outlets about stories related to food sovereignty which would not be included in the final version of Gather.

Produced in the United States in the English language, Gather has a runtime of 74 minutes.

== Release ==
On March 11, 2020, a preliminary screening of Gather to an entirely Native audience in Colorado met with approval. The audience reaction reassured director Sanjay Rawal that he had created an appropriate documentary despite being non-Native himself.

Gather premiered at the Human Rights Watch Film Festival in 2020.

Gather was released on Apple TV+ and Amazon Prime Video on September 8, 2020. As of December 1, 2020, viewing or screening it in Europe was only possible if a permission form had been approved by the producers of the documentary. On November 1, 2021, Gather was released on Netflix.

== Critical reception ==
Gather was described as "wide-ranging, addressing both systemic issues and small-scale solutions" in a YES! Magazine review by Valerie Schloredt. In Mother Jones, senior editor Maddie Oatman contrasted it with the Netflix documentary Kiss the Ground, writing that Kiss the Ground "remains sheltered under the auspices of modern capitalism" and glosses over the "struggle" and "violence" that Gather explores. In The New Republic, Jo Livingstone described its production style as "firmly rooted in the subject at hand". In the Spanish language version of Condé Nast Traveler, an article by Marc Casanovas titled Por qué Gather ya es el mejor documental del año en Estados Unidos ("Why Gather is already the best documentary of the year in the United States") described the documentary as "a cry in favor of food sovereignty and the recognition of the generational trauma" ingrained in indigenous people.

== Accolades ==
Gather was awarded Best Documentary Feature at the Red Nation Film Festival Awards in 2020. It was named a Critic's Pick by The New York Times in September 2020. Gather won a James Beard Foundation Media Award for Best Documentary, awarded June 12, 2022.
