= The Washington Spectator =

Left-leaning independent political periodical

- Type: Monthly periodical
- Founder: Tristram Coffin
- Publisher: Hamilton Fish V
- Editor: Louis Dubose
- Founded: 1974; 52 years ago
- Headquarters: New York City
- ISSN: 0887-428X
- Website: washingtonspectator.org

The Washington Spectator is an independent political periodical with a circulation of 60,000, published bimonthly by the Public Concern Foundation. It was founded by Tristram Coffin in 1971 as Washington Watch, and became The Washington Spectator in 1974. Coffin remained editor until 1993. Generally, every issue covers a single topic—most often, one that its editors believe is not receiving sufficient coverage in the mainstream media outlets. Since the COVID pandemic began in 2020, it has published its issues online-only.

== Circulation ==
In 1997, the Washington Spectator had a circulation of some 65,000.

== Staff ==
The current editor-in-chief is Lou Dubose, who assumed the editorship in 2007. Dubose is the author of Vice: Dick Cheney and the Hijacking of the American Presidency and co-author, with Molly Ivins, of the books Bushwhacked: Life in George Bush's America, Shrub: The Short but Happy Political Life of George W. Bush, and Bill of Wrongs: The Executive Branch's Assault on America's Fundamental Rights.

The current publisher is Hamilton Fish V.

=== Founder Tris Coffin ===
Tristram Coffin (1912–1997), born in Hood River, Oregon, grew up in Indianapolis and graduated from Depauw University. He worked for the Indianapolis Times, for whom he covered gangster John Dillinger, before becoming press secretary to Governor Clifford Townsend and then staffer when Townsend became an assistant secretary at the United States Department of Agriculture. During World War II, Coffin returned to journalism as a radio reporter, covering the White House for CBS Radio and Capitol Hill for ABC Radio. Coffin then joined Drew Pearson's Washington Merry-Go-Round. In 1947, he published a critical book on US President Harry S. Truman, entitled Missouri Compromise, after which he established a syndicated column, "Tris Coffin's Daybook," while working for ABC. (Coffin wrote half a dozen other books.) In 1968, Coffin raised funds to start the Washington Watch newsletter, which became the Washington Spectator in 1975. After writing and editing the newsletter for more than two decades, Coffin retired; he died in 1997. Ralph de Toledano and Victor Lasky cited Coffin in their book Seeds of Treason (1950).

=== Others ===
Besides founder and former editor Coffin, former editors include Ben A. Franklin, who helmed the periodical from 1993 to 2005. In the early 1990s, the Spectator distinguished itself with reporting on the sexual assault scandals of Oregon Senator Robert Packwood, who resigned his office in 1995.

Recent staffers include David Weigel, a reporter for The Washington Post. Former publisher Kevin Walter now serves as associate publisher of Mother Jones magazine. Phillip Frazer also served as publisher of the Spectator. Other contributors include William T. Vollmann, David Cay Johnston, Rev. William Barber, Aryeh Neier, and Steven Pressman.
