= Student/Farmworker Alliance =

US youth activism group

Student/Farmworker Alliance (SFA) is a network of students and youth formally organized in 2000 in the United States. SFA campaigns for the improvement of working conditions in the agricultural fields of the United States. The organization cooperates with the Coalition of Immokalee Workers (CIW), a membership-led organization of mostly Mexican, Guatemalan and Mayan Indian immigrants working in agricultural and other low-wage jobs throughout the state of Florida.

== Taco Bell Boycott ==
In March 2005, after four years of campaigning, farmworkers from the CIW and their allies scored a decisive victory in their national Taco Bell boycott. Yielding to growing pressure from the CIW, students, and other allies, Taco Bell and its parent company Yum! Brands conceded to all of the boycott's demands, agreeing to work with the CIW to improve the sub-poverty wages and working conditions of farmworkers in its tomato supply chain.

Students and youth were a crucial part of this grassroots coalition. As Taco Bell's target market (18- to 24-year-olds), they instead put a target on Taco Bell, making the boycott one of the fastest-growing campaigns for economic justice on campuses and communities throughout the country. Between 2002 and 2005, twenty-two high schools and universities removed or prevented Taco Bell restaurants and sponsorships as part of SFA's “Boot the Bell” campaign. By the boycott's end, dozens of additional campaigns were underway, and Taco Bell was unable to secure new campus contracts without fear of vocal student opposition.

== The Campaign Against McDonald's ==
In the wake of the Taco Bell Boycott victory, the CIW focused in 2006 on the McDonald's Corporation, demanding better wages for the farmworkers providing tomatoes in their supply chain. On April 9, 2007, after two years of intense campaigning, McDonald's agreed to meet all of the CIW's demands. As in the Taco Bell Boycott victory, youth and student organizing played a crucial role in the swift success of the McDonald's campaign.

== Media resources ==
- Farm Workers Target McDonald's, Suppliers Common Dreams News Center
- I'm leavin' it: Students and Farmworkers Bring on McDonald's: AFL-CIO
- Students take tomato pickers' fight to McDonald's: Workday Minnesota
- An Open Letter to Ronald McDonald: Guerrilla News Network
- Student Groups to McD's: "Our Patience Is All But Exhausted": Student/Farmworker Alliance
- A win for the Coalition of Immokalee Workers: In These Times
- Doing It For Themselves: In These Times
- After McDonald's Victory, Labor Activists Target Burger King: The New Standard
