= Sue Kelly =

American politician (born 1936)

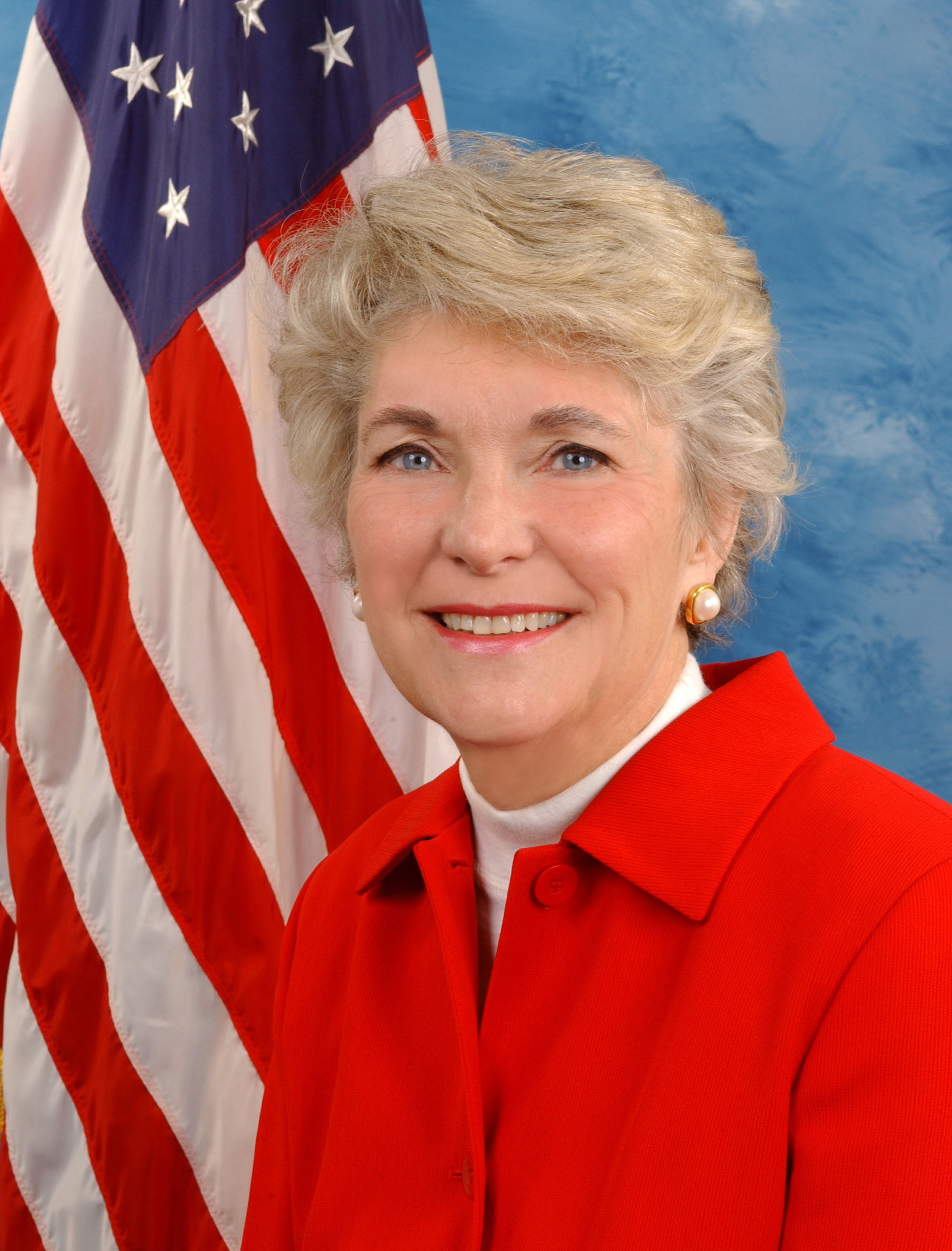

Member of the U.S. House of Representatives from New York's 19th district
- In office January 3, 1995 – January 3, 2007
- Preceded by: Hamilton Fish
- Succeeded by: John Hall

Personal details
- Born: Madelyn Sue Weisenbarger; September 26, 1936 (age 89) Lima, Ohio, U.S.
- Party: Republican
- Spouse: Ed Kelly
- Education: Denison University (BA); Sarah Lawrence College (MA)

Sue Weisenbarger Kelly (née Madelyn Sue Weisenbarger; born September 26, 1936) is an American businesswoman and politician who served as a Republican member of the United States House of Representatives from 1995 to 2007, representing New York's 19th District. She was elected to the seat that had been held by Republican Hamilton Fish IV after he dropped out of the 1994 race due to prostate cancer. Kelly defeated his son, Hamilton Fish V, in that race and served until John Hall defeated her in the 2006 congressional election.

Kelly served from February 1999 to April 2001 as Chair of the House Page Board, which came under fire during the Mark Foley scandal.

== Early life and career ==
Sue Kelly was born in Lima, Ohio, on September 26, 1936. She was raised Presbyterian and graduated from Denison University in 1958. She also holds a Master's degree from Sarah Lawrence College.

She held jobs as a small business owner, patient advocate, rape counselor, and educator. She first became involved in politics by working as an advisor and campaign manager for Hamilton Fish IV, who represented Kelly's home area in New York's Hudson Valley.

== U.S. House of Representatives ==
=== 1994 election ===
When U.S. Rep. Hamilton Fish IV, a Republican, decided not to seek re-election in 1994, Kelly ran for Congress. She defeated Fish's son, Hamilton Fish V, who ran as a Democrat, as well as Conservative Party and Right to Life Party candidate Joseph DioGuardi and independent Catherine Portman-Laux.

=== 2004 election ===
In 2004, Kelly easily won re-election with 67% of the vote in New York's 19th Congressional district although The New York Times described Kelly's opponents in previous races as "token opposition".

=== 2006 election ===
In 2006, Kelly was defeated by Democratic opponent John Hall.

Initially, Hall's candidacy was considered a "long-shot," but he gained momentum after Kelly faced criticism in October 2006 for her connection to the Mark Foley scandal. Kelly refused to speak to a reporter from a local news network about the matter and also did not appear at a televised debate sponsored by the League of Women Voters. Kelly was represented by an empty chair at the debate.

Kelly was endorsed by the League of Conservation Voters, an environmental advocacy group. Her score of 92% was the highest among any Republican Member of Congress in 2006. Kelly had earned a 17% score from the LCV in 2005, but attributed that score to the many missed votes that came in the several days she was absent due to a death in the family.

Kelly stated she was an "independent voice" in Congress, but the Times Herald Record noted that in 25 of the closest House votes during her last session, Kelly sided with the Republican leadership 24 times.

=== Political positions ===
Kelly compiled a socially moderate and fiscally conservative voting record in Congress. A 2006 survey of congressional power and effectiveness by the nonpartisan company, Knowlegis, indicated that Rep. Kelly was among the 100 most powerful lawmakers in the 435-member House. The survey also labelled Kelly as the second most powerful congressperson in the New York delegation, second only to Thomas M. Reynolds, who was chairman of the National Republican Congressional Committee.

== Personal life ==
Kelly is married to Edward Kelly, and they live in Katonah, New York. As of 2020, they had four children and eight grandchildren.

== Electoral history ==
U.S. House election, 1996: New York District 19
Party	Candidate	Votes	%	±%
Republican	Sue W. Kelly (incumbent)	102,142	46.3	
Democratic	Richard S. Klein	86,926	39.4	
Conservative	Joseph J. DioGuardi	27,424	12.4	
Independence	William E. Haase	4,104	1.9	
Majority		15,216	6.9	
Turnout		220,596		

U.S. House election, 1998: New York District 19
Party	Candidate	Votes	%	±%
Republican	Sue W. Kelly (incumbent)	104,467	62.2	+15.9
Democratic	Dick Collins	56,378	33.6	−5.8
Right to Life	Joseph J. DioGuardi	5,941	3.5	+3.5
Freedom Party	Charles C. Williams	1,046	0.6	+0.6
Majority		48,089	28.7	+21.8
Turnout		167,832		−23.9

U.S. House election, 2000: New York District 19
Party	Candidate	Votes	%	±%
Republican	Sue W. Kelly (incumbent)	145,532	60.9	−1.3
Democratic	Lawrence Otis Graham	85,871	35.9	+2.3
Right to Life	Frank X. Lloyd	4,086	1.7	−1.8
Green	Mark R. Jacobs	3,662	1.5	+1.5
Majority		59,661	24.9	−3.8
Turnout		239,151		+42.5

U.S. House election, 2002: New York District 19
Party	Candidate	Votes	%	±%
Republican	Sue W. Kelly (incumbent)	121,129	70.0	+9.1
Democratic	Janine M. H. Selendy	44,967	26.0	−9.9
Right to Life	Christine M. Tighe	4,374	2.5	+0.8
Green	Jonathan M. Wright	2,642	1.5	−0.0
Majority		76,162	44.0	+19.1
Turnout		173,112		−27.6

U.S. House election, 2004: New York District 19
Party	Candidate	Votes	%	±%
Republican	Sue W. Kelly (incumbent)	175,401	66.7	−3.3
Democratic	Michael Jaliman	87,429	33.3	+7.3
Majority		87,972	33.5	−10.5
Turnout		262,830		+51.8

U.S. House election, 2006: New York District 19
Party	Candidate	Votes	%	±%
Democratic	John Hall	100,119	51.2	+17.9
Republican	Sue W. Kelly (incumbent)	95,359	48.8	−17.9
Majority		4,760	2.4	−31.1
Turnout		195,478		−25.6

== See also ==
- Women in the United States House of Representatives

U.S. House of Representatives
Preceded by Hamilton Fish	Member of the U.S. House of Representatives from New York's 19th congressional district 1995–2007	Succeeded by John Hall
Preceded by Nancy Johnson	Chair of the Congressional Women's Caucus; 1999–2001	Succeeded by Judy Biggert
U.S. order of precedence (ceremonial)
Preceded by Jack Quinn as Former U.S. Representative	Order of precedence of the United States as Former U.S. Representative	Succeeded by Vito Fossella as Former U.S. Representative
