= Bon Appétit Management Company =

Cafe and catering operator

- Type: Subsidiary
- Industry: Food service
- Founded: 1987 (Palo Alto, CA)
- Headquarters: Palo Alto, California, United States
- Key people: Fedele Bauccio, CEO; Michael Bauccio, President
- Parent: Compass Group
- Website: www.bamco.com

Bon Appétit Management Company is a Palo Alto, California-based on-site restaurant company, that provides café and catering services to corporations, colleges, and universities. The company is a subsidiary of the British multinational corporation Compass Group since 2002, and operates over 1,000 cafes in 33 states.

In May 2018, Bon Appétit became the first food service provider and major restaurant company to ban plastic straws in all of its locations, with an exception for people with disabilities.

== Sustainability initiatives ==
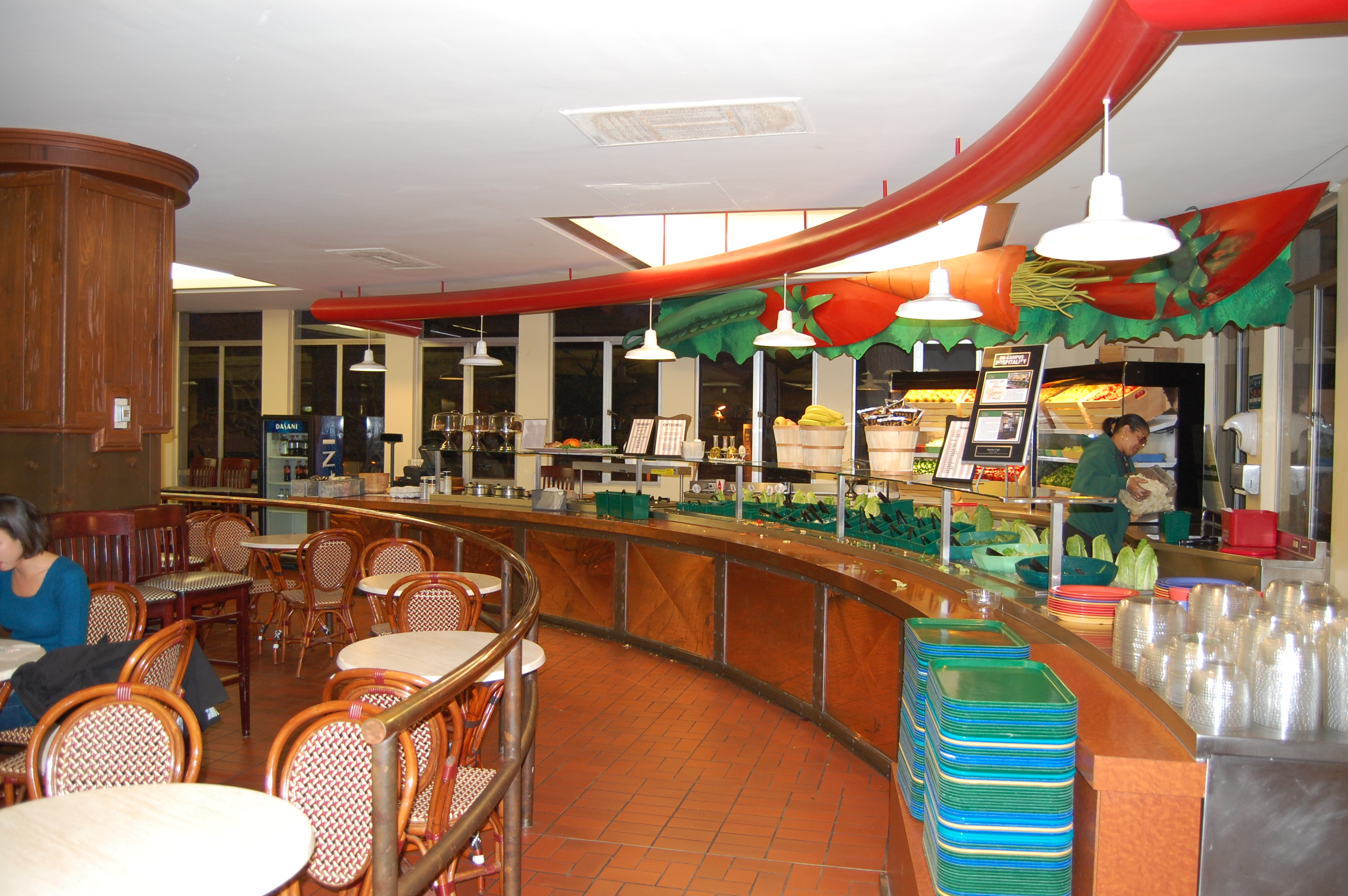

Bon Appétit has developed programs with Environmental Defense, the Monterey Bay Aquarium's Seafood Watch, the Humane Society of the United States, and other conservation organizations. It promotes the use of compostable materials.
