= Twila Cassadore =

Indigenous forager and food educator

Twila Cassadore is an Arizona-based forager, food educator, advocate for Indigenous food sovereignty, and member of the San Carlos Apache Tribe who teaches Indigenous food traditions throughout the Western Apache tribes. Through her work, Cassadore promotes the importance of foods consumed by Apaches prior to the forcible relocation of Native Americans to reservations and subsequent reliance on government rations. She interviews tribal elders, takes foraging trips into the wilderness, and delivers public presentations to share her research.

== Career ==
Cassadore has been a food educator for the past 25 years, launching a project called the Western Apache Diet Project to interview tribal elders and popularize traditional foods such as acorn and grass seeds. She interviewed over 100 tribal elders, ultimately helping to identify more than 200 traditional Apache edible plants and nearly as many traditional Apache recipes for a database funded with a 2013 grant of $37,500 by the First Nations’ Native Agriculture and Food Systems Initiative.

Limited access to foods with high nutritional content and sedentary lifestyles are linked to health problems in the Western Apache population, including high levels of obesity, diabetes, high blood pressure, and heart disease; substance abuse, domestic violence, and suicide are also prevalent. Cassadore has spoken about struggling with addiction and mental health crises in her own life, including suicide attempts, prior to beginning her career as a food educator. She notes that many of the tribal youth she works with have similarly experienced trauma, saying, "I was sexually assaulted before I even attended kindergarten. This is something we never will talk about. Many on the rez have gone through this.” Cassadore has stated that foraging helped her heal. In a seminar on the Western Apache Diet Project, she said, "I have been drug-free since 2002. And reconnecting with myself and my identity was done through harvesting. And harvesting some of these food in the locations that were my ancestors are from, the clan maps of where some of these places we’ve gone to and reconnecting with who I am and it rooted me back to where I came from. It gave me a sense of purpose."

One component of Cassadore's foraging includes leading hunts for the gloscho (desert woodrat), hunts that were in the past led only by men. The San Carlos Apache Culture Center Museum, the Natural Resources Apache Foods Program, and the Apache Tradition and Culture group sponsored a hunt in March 2020 open to the public.

She has appeared with television host Padma Lakshmi on the series Taste the Nation. She is also featured in Gather, a documentary film on Indigenous food sovereignty.
