= WCIW-LP =

- Immokalee, Florida; United States
- Frequency: 107.7 MHz
- Branding: Radio Conciencia

Programming
- Language: Spanish
- Format: Community

Ownership
- Owner: Coalition of Immokalee Workers; (Interfaith Action of Southwest Florida, Inc.)

History
- First air date: 2004
- Former call signs: WCTI-LP (2003–2004)
- Former frequencies: 107.9 MHz (2004–2016)
- Call sign meaning: Coalition of Immokalee Workers

Technical information
- Licensing authority: FCC
- Facility ID: 133832
- Class: L1
- ERP: 100 watts
- HAAT: 28 meters (92 ft)
- Transmitter coordinates: 26°23′42.6″N 81°24′46.1″W

Links
- Public license information: LMS

WCIW-LP (107.7 FM, "Radio Conciencia") is an American low-power radio station licensed to serve the community of Immokalee, Florida, United States. The station is operated by the Coalition of Immokalee Workers, an organization representing farm workers in one of the largest winter vegetable markets in the United States of America. The WCIW-LP broadcast license is held by Interfaith Action of Southwest Florida, Inc.

== Programming ==
With 100 watts of effective radiated power, WCIW-LP broadcasts a community radio format to an area approximately 15 miles (24 km) in and around Immokalee, bringing music and news to the immigrant farm workers from their homelands, in their own languages. The languages include Spanish, Haitian Creole, and some of the indigenous languages of Central America.

== History ==
In June 2001, Interfaith Action of Southwest Florida, Inc., applied to the Federal Communications Commission (FCC) for a construction permit for a new broadcast radio station. The FCC granted this permit on June 11, 2003, with a scheduled expiration date of December 11, 2004. The new station was assigned call sign "WCTI-LP" on December 2, 2003. The station was assigned new call sign "WCIW-LP" by the FCC on January 12, 2004. After construction and testing were completed, the station was granted its broadcast license on June 7, 2004.

WCIW-LP was the fifth community radio barnraising of the Prometheus Radio Project.

== See also ==
- List of community radio stations in the United States
- List of Pacifica Radio stations and affiliates
