= Food Chains =

- Release poster
- Directed by: Sanjay Rawal
- Written by: Erin Barnett; Sanjay Rawal
- Produced by: Smriti Keshari; Hamilton Fish; Sanjay Rawal
- Starring: Eve Ensler; Barry Estabrook; Dolores Huerta; Robert F. Kennedy Jr. Kerry Kennedy; Eva Longoria; Eric Schlosser; Forest Whitaker
- Cinematography: Forest Woodward
- Edited by: Erin Barnett
- Music by: Gil Talmi; Macklemore
- Distributed by: Screen Media
- Release date: February 2014 (Berlinale)
- Running time: 83 minutes
- Country: United States
- Language: English

Food Chains is a 2014 American documentary film about agricultural labor in the United States directed by Sanjay Rawal. It was the Recipient of the 2015 James Beard Foundation Award for Special/Documentary.

== Summary ==
In Immokalee, Florida, migrant farmworkers pick fruits and vegetables that are sold to large US food wholesalers. However, their working conditions are shown to be less than favorable. As a result, they form the Coalition of Immokalee Workers (CIW) to raise awareness and improve their circumstances. Specifically, they go on a hunger strike to pressure Publix, a Florida-based food wholesaler, to pay them one penny more per pound of tomato. Meanwhile, the documentary also shows farmworkers in the vineyards of the Napa Valley.

== Production ==
The film was produced by actress and Democratic fundraiser Eva Longoria, Fast Food Nation author Eric Schlosser, and heiress Abigail Disney, among others.

It was presented at the Berlin Film Festival, the Tribeca Film Festival and the Napa Valley Film Festival. Shortly after, Screen Media purchased the distribution rights for North America. A Spanish version, narrated by actor Demián Bichir was released.

== Critical reception ==
In a review for The Hollywood Reporter, Frank Scheck suggested not much had changed since Harvest of Shame, a 1960 documentary about the same topic. He concluded that Food Chains was 'simultaneously inspirational and deeply depressing.' Writing for the San Francisco Chronicle, Tara Duggan added that there were 'many chilling moments' in the documentary. In The New York Daily News, Elizabeth Weitzman called the documentary 'unsettling,' concluding 'you will certainly leave the theater more enlightened than when you arrived.'. Jeannette Catsoulis of the New York Times called the film 'rousing' and 'emphatic and empathetic.'.
