= Sanjay Rawal =

Documentary filmmaker

Sanjay Rawal (born October 30, 1974) is an Indian-American documentary film director who lives in New York City. His first feature length film Food Chains premiered at the Berlin Film Festival in its Culinary Cinema Programme in 2014 and had its US premiere at the Tribeca Film Festival. Food Chains was produced by Smriti Keshari, Eva Longoria, Eric Schlosser, and Rawal himself. Forest Whitaker narrates. Rawal was a winner of the 2015 James Beard Foundation Award for Special/Documentary for Food Chains. The film itself shared the 2016 BritDoc Documentary Impact Award.

Rawal's second movie 3100: Run and Become was released in 2018. The film was featured on a number of podcasts including Dr. Rangan Chatterjee. “Running unites us. At one point, every culture on Earth relied on running. It’s baked into our DNA,” Rawal said. The film received generally positive reviews including by Kimber Myers of the Los Angeles Times. "Rawal's well-shot film is engaging - particularly for those with an interest in running and/or meditation," she wrote. Critic Pamela Powell went further, writing "3100: Run and Become beautifully captures the heart and inspiration of all who close their eyes, take a breath, and open their hearts to life."

Rawal's third film, Gather, was released straight-to-digital in September 2020 because of the Covid-19 pandemic. It received a New York Times Critic's Pick selection. Reviewer Lovia Gyarkye wrote, "The film wonderfully weaves personal stories with archival footage that contextualizes the continued violence against Native Americans. Rawal covers a substantial amount of ground and deftly balances the dense material without losing sight of the mission driving the bigger story: Healing from generational trauma sometimes starts with just one person." The film counted Jason Momoa as an Executive Producer. Mr. Momoa promoted the film on The Daily Show with Trevor Noah. The film was awarded a James Beard Foundation Media Award on June 12, 2022, making Rawal a rare two-time winner.

Rawal was raised in northern California, where his father is a tomato breeder, and so Rawal was introduced to the agricultural industry at a young age. He began Food Chains in 2011, after witnessing the inequality in the fields of Florida. In March 2016, Rawal was thanked by the Bernie Sanders campaign for the licensing of related video footage used in the Sanders' advertisement titled "Tenemos Familias." Rawal has advocated against the power of large food monopolies and has pushed local, labor-friendly solutions to human rights abuses in the fields.

Rawal's second short documentary film, Challenging Impossibility, premiered at the 2011 Tribeca Film Festival and played in nearly 70 more. It won awards at several film festivals including at the Atlanta Shortsfest. His first film of any kind Ocean Monk won the Best Documentary Short Award at the 2010 St. Louis International Film Festival.

Prior to becoming a filmmaker, Rawal was deeply involved with international development and ran projects in over 40 nations. He worked on projects with celebrities like Wyclef Jean and Donna Karan. Rawal was also engaged in activism regarding peace, security, and women's issues—serving on the first men's committee for V-Day.

Much of his work has been inspired by his spiritual teacher Sri Chinmoy and he has edited and published books by this leader—including America the Beautiful, which was read as an audiobook by Richard Dreyfuss as well as Guru Marathon, published by District Vision.

Sanjay is also a national-class Master's long-distance runner. He was first in the US half-marathon championship in 2023 for the Men's 45-49 category.
