= Fair Food Program =

Farm worker protection program

The Fair Food Program (FFP) is a partnership between growers, farmworkers, and food company buyers to improve conditions for farmworkers. It was launched by the Coalition of Immokalee Workers (CIW), a worker-based human rights organization in Immokalee, Florida in 2011. The Fair Food Program functions through legally binding agreements between the CIW and large retail companies that pledge to buy produce only from growers who follow the Fair Food Program's Code of Conduct, paying an extra penny a pound to farmworkers. Companies that sign an agreement with the CIW pledge to cease purchasing from any grower that violates the standards. The Fair Foods Standards Council (FFSC) oversees the program and ensures that standards are upheld.

The Fair Food Program is credited with helping eradicate modern-day slavery and forced labor on participating farms and as of 2023 had extended its protections to workers in 10 states and nine crops domestically. Several participating buyers in the Fair Food Program pledged their support for extending the enforceable protections to workers in the three countries with pilot farms, Mexico, Chile, and South Africa. Major participating buyers include McDonald's, Walmart, Whole Foods, Trader Joe's, and Yum Brands. In spite of pressure and protests, some supermarket chains, including Kroger and Publix, refuse to join the Fair Food Program.

== Implementation ==
A series of interlocking mechanisms define the Fair Food Program: large retail corporations become Participating Buyers, who agree to only source relevant produce from farms that follow the Fair Food Program's code of conduct by signing an agreement with the Coalition of Immokalee Workers (CIW). In turn, farms, or Participating Growers, which follow the worker-developed Code of Conduct gain access to sell their produce to Buyers with preferential ordering. The Fair Food Standards Council, a third-party monitoring group, ensures farms' compliance with the Code of Conduct. According to the Coalition of Immokalee Workers, two unique driving forces behind the Fair Food Program are that workers are empowered to be the monitors of their own rights, and that it is backed by meaningful market consequences for farms that do not follow the Code of Conduct.

=== Fair Food Label ===
The CIW has also developed a consumer-facing "Fair Food Label" to help promote the program in supermarkets.

== Code of Conduct ==
The Fair Food Program's Code of Conduct is developed by farmworkers and applies both to the working and living conditions of farmworkers. It contains zero-tolerance provisions such as forced labor, sexual assault, and systemic child labor mandating a farm's suspension from the program until they address the violations.

More broadly, the code outlines a series of worker protections including: a timekeeping system to prevent wage theft, freedom to speak without retaliation for voicing complaints or grievances, a premium pay generally referred to as an extra "penny per pound" of produce harvested that raises wages, and housing conditions compliant with state and federal regulations. The Code of Conduct further mandates periods of rest for workers during the hottest months of the year, and access to water, bathrooms, and shade.

== Fair Food Standards Council ==
The Fair Food Standards Council (FFSC) is an independent human rights monitoring body ensuring the implementation of the Fair Food Program. The FFSC performs field audits interviewing a majority of farmworkers on each participating farm seasonally, operates a 24/7 confidential hotline maintained by Spanish, Haitian Creole, and English-language speakers that allows workers to anonymously voice complaints regarding living and working conditions, and sends reports of code of conduct violations to growers in the form of corrective action plans. The FFSC also works with the CIW to host on-the-clock education sessions informing farmworkers on participating farms of their rights and responsibilities under the program.

Judge Laura Safer Espinoza, a retired New York State Supreme Court Justice, was appointed executive director of the FFSC.

== Participating buyers and growers ==
=== Buyers ===
Ahold USA, Aramark, Bon Appétit Management Co., Burger King, Chipotle Mexican Grill, Compass Group, Sodexo, The Fresh Market, McDonald's, Subway, Trader Joe's, Walmart, Whole Foods Market, and Yum Brands.

=== Growers ===
Ag-Mart Produce d/b/a Santa Sweets, Alderman Farms, DiMare Homestead, DiMare Ruskin, HarDee/Diamond D Triple D, Gargiulo, Lady Moon Farms, Lipman Family Farms, Pacific Tomato Growers d/b/a Sunripe Certified Brands, West Coast Tomato / McClure Farms, Smoky Mountain Family Farms, Fresh Tulips LLC d/b/a Bloomia, Araucania Flowers – Bloomia Chile, Sun Valley Wholesale Florist, Watkins Farm, Rancho Durazno, Hardee Fresh, Good Dog Farm.

== Background ==
In 2005, after the CIW boycotted Taco Bell for almost four years, the company agreed to sign a Fair Food Agreement, committing the company to pay a "penny more per pound" on its tomatoes, to be passed on as wage bonus to tomato harvesters, and to work with CIW to improve conditions in the fields. College campuses were a major impetus for this agreement; twenty-two colleges banned Taco Bell from operating. The CIW then targeted McDonald's for two years; in 2007, McDonald's signed a Fair Food Agreement with CIW. Other fast-food chains and food retailers followed suit.

Despite this success, in 2007, the Florida Tomato Growers, the state's largest tomato producer, slowed the CIW's progress. They threatened farms with $100,000 worth of fines if they passed through "penny per pound" monies. In 2010, Pacific Tomato Growers and Lipman, two of the nation's largest producers, signed on to the program, effectively ending the industry boycott. Months later the Florida Tomato Growers Exchange signed onto the Fair Food Program, which began widespread implementation of the model.

Through its nationwide campaigns, the Coalition of Immokalee Workers pressured growers that produce 90 percent of Florida's tomatoes to increase wages for their 30,000 workers and follow strict standards that mandate rest breaks and forbid sexual harassment and verbal abuse. Building on CIW's prior agreements with food industry buyers (e.g., passthrough payments and a supplier code of conduct), the FFP established the Fair Food Standards Council (FFSC), a third-party monitor to audit suppliers, investigate worker complaints, and provide educational programs for workers. By 2011, the Fair Food Program in its current form was fully functioning, with Participating Buyers, Growers, and human rights investigators from the Fair Food Standards Council.

Walmart joined the Fair Food Program on January 16, 2014. The company sells 20% of the United States' fresh tomatoes. Walmart additionally agreed to help expand the Program outside Florida and expand into other crops.

== Success and expansion ==
=== Protection ===
The Fair Food Program is credited with eliminating cases of forced labor from farms in the Fair Food Program. In addition, the Fair Food Program is reported to have dramatically transformed the working conditions in portions of the agricultural sector in which it has participating farms. The FFP has been lauded by the United Nations as an "international benchmark" in the fight against modern-day slavery and called one of "the most important social-impact success stories of the past century" by the Harvard Business Review.

The Fair Food Programs covers crops in 10 states including Florida, Maryland, Virginia, New Jersey, and California and includes tomatoes, peonies, tulips, cantaloupes, sweet potatoes, peaches, lettuce, dill, mint, and squash. In 2023, the Department of Labor's Bureau of International Affairs announced a partnership between the U.S. Government and Fair Food Standards Council to expand the program internationally to Mexico, Chile, and South Africa. The Fair Food Program is also being adapted to the fishing industry, with a pilot program launched in 2022 to protect fishermen in the United Kingdom.

Since the Fair Food Program's inception, participating buyers have paid nearly US$40 million in premium pay to farm workers, and the Fair Food Standards Council has resolved thousands of issues raised by worker complaints and its own audits. "'When I first visited Immokalee, I heard appalling stories of abuse and modern slavery,' said Susan L. Marquis, dean of the Pardee RAND Graduate School, a public policy institution in Santa Monica, California 'But now the tomato fields in Immokalee are probably the best working environment in American agriculture. In the past three years, they've gone from being the worst to the best.'"

== Evaluation ==
Since its launch in 2011, academics and human rights experts have praised the Fair Food Program for its worker-driven approach to rights monitoring and enforcement.

A decade-long, longitudinal study of human rights in supply chain programs conducted by the Institute of Multi-Stakeholder Initiative Integrity, published in 2020 cited the "Fair Food Program, and the Worker-driven Social Responsibility model as leading examples of new 'gold standard' with effective mechanisms for 'empowering rights holders to know and exercise their rights'." In 2023, an academic study of the Fair Food Program published in the International Journal of Production Economics found that "[The Fair Food Program] is unique in the sense that it has been developed and deployed by the workers themselves and has gained a wide acceptance among buyers and farmers. It therefore follows a truly sustainable approach because it is not dependent on some [Corporate Social Responsibility] goodwill."

A 2022 study published in the Business and Human Rights Journal found that Fair Food Program's worker-driven model of rights enforcement in supply chains is more effective at safeguarding workers' rights than corporate-backed initiatives or multi-stakeholder initiatives, writing "the same independent, third-party monitor, created specifically for the [worker-driven social responsibility] program, investigates complaints from farmworkers and conducts field audits on farms. This creates a virtuous constant feedback loop, in which complaint resolutions provide for ongoing monitoring and enforcement complemented by the broader investigations and more expansive changes enabled through audits and corrective action plans. As a result, WSR programs are better at enforcement than corporate-established initiatives, resulting in real-life improvements for workers." Moreover, in evaluating long-term changes in the power of farmworkers, the study concludes: "over the 10-year history of the Fair Food Program, complaints by workers made to growers, who then report them to the Fair Food Program independent monitor, have increased. This suggests that at least part of the workforce now trust in the system enough to call their employer first, without fear of any retaliation."

In 2021, Oxfam Great Britain conducted a survey querying human rights experts about effective means of worker representation in the economy. They found that "The Coalition of Immokalee Workers' Fair Food Program was the most widely cited example when Oxfam asked 23 experts about effective ways for workers to represent themselves."

== Awards and recognition ==
- The Roosevelt Institute awarded the CIW its 2013 Freedom from Want Medal in 2013.
- After an investigation from PBS's Frontline for all of 2013, they declared the FFP to be the "single most effective prevention program in the U.S. agricultural industry."
- The President's Advisory Council on Faith-Based and Neighborhood Partnerships reported that the FFP was one of the "most successful and innovative programs" to prevent modern slavery.
- In May 2013, a delegation from the UN visited the Fair Food Program stakeholders and announced that the program had successfully created, "market incentives for participating growers.
- A Washington Post article stated that the "CIW model is one of the great human rights success stories of our day."
- In 2015, the Fair Food Program received the Presidential Medal for Extraordinary Efforts in Combatting Modern-day Slavery from Secretary of State John Kerry at a White House ceremony.
- In 2017, the Harvard Business Review deemed the FFP one of "the most important social-impact success stories of the 21st Century," alongside the anti-apartheid movement, polio eradication, and public libraries.
- In 2017, CIW co-founder Greg Asbed was awarded the MacArthur 'Genius' Award for helping to pioneer the Fair Food Program.
- The Fair Food Program was credited by the American Bar Association in 2022 as a major feature human rights accomplishment in its annual Frances Perkins Public Service Award, given to the Coalition of Immokalee Workers.
