= Sidney Webster Fish =

Lawyer, officer and California ranch owner

Capt. Sidney Webster Fish
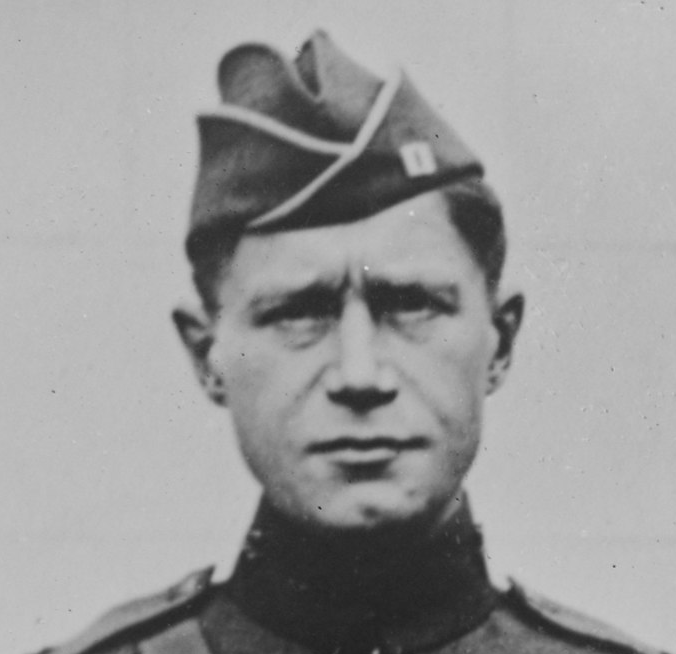
- Capt. Fish, 1919
- Born: March 16, 1885; New York City, New York
- Died: February 2, 1950 (aged 64); Carmel, California
- Education: Groton School; Harvard University; Columbia Law School
- Spouses: Olga Martha Wiborg (m. 1915; died 1937) Esther Foss Moore Roark (m. 1939)
- Children: Sidney Stuyvesant Fish
- Parent(s): Stuyvesant Fish; Marian Graves Anthon Fish
- Relatives: Hamilton Fish (grandfather); Nicholas Fish II (uncle); Hamilton Fish II (uncle); Hamilton Fish III (cousin); Hamilton Fish (cousin)

Sidney Webster Fish (March 16, 1885 – February 5, 1950) was an American lawyer and military officer who retired from the law and moved to California, becoming a rancher at the Palo Corona Ranch.

== Early life ==
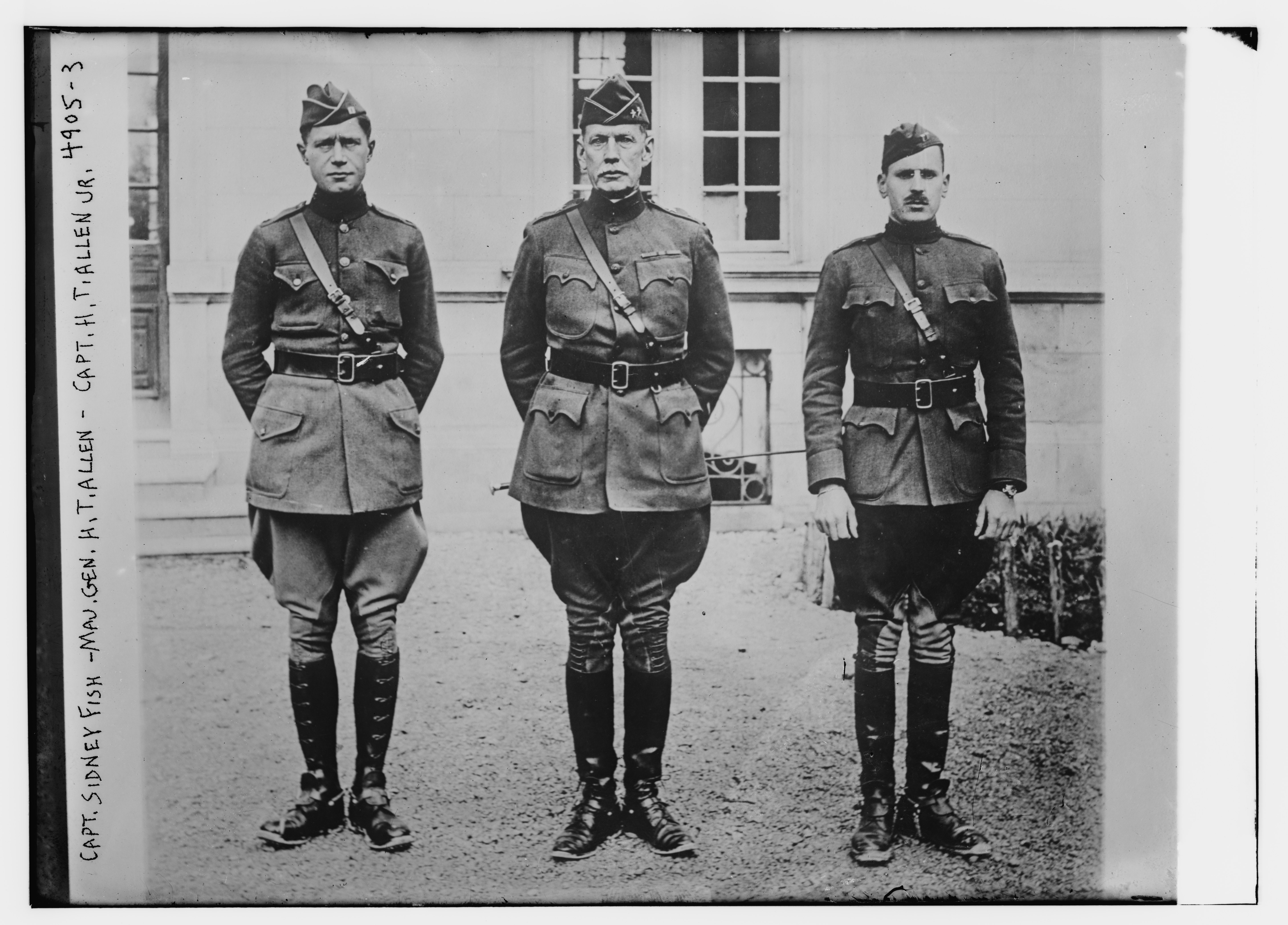
Capt. Fish, Maj.-Gen. Henry Tureman Allen, and Capt. Henry T. Allen Jr., 1919

Fish was born on March 16, 1885, in New York City and was named after his uncle, Sidney Webster. (Note: Sidney Webster (1828–1910), was the husband of Fish's paternal aunt, Sarah Morris (née Fish) Webster (1838–1925). A graduate of Harvard Law School, Webster served as private secretary to President Franklin Pierce before practicing law in New York City where he was a recognized expert on constitutional law. Webster was also a director of the Illinois Central Railroad, of which Fish's father, Stuyvesant Fish, was the longtime president.) A member of the prominent Fish family, he was the youngest of four children of Stuyvesant Fish (1851–1923) and Marian Graves Anthon Fish (1853–1915), a leader of "The 400". His two surviving siblings were Marian Anthon Fish (1880–1944), who married (and divorced) Albert Zabriskie Gray (a son of Judge John Clinton Gray, and Stuyvesant Fish Jr., who married Isabelle Mildred Dick (a daughter of Evans R. Dick. Another brother, Livingston Fish, was born and died before Sidney was born.

His paternal grandparents were Hamilton Fish, the 16th governor of New York, a U.S. senator, and U.S. secretary of state, (Note: Fish's grandfather, Hamilton Fish, was a son of Nicholas Fish and Elizabeth (née Stuyvesant) Fish (a great-great-granddaughter of Peter Stuyvesant, the last Dutch Director-General of New Amsterdam.)) and Julia Ursin Niemcewicz (née Kean) Fish (sister of Col. John Kean), a descendant of New Jersey governor William Livingston. His maternal grandparents were Sarah Attwood (née Meert) Athon and Gen. William Henry Anthon, a successful lawyer and Staten Island Assemblyman who was a son of jurist John Anthon.

Fish prepared for college at Groton School before graduating from Harvard University, in 1908, and then Columbia Law School.

== Career ==
After his admission to the bar, he practiced law until 1928. He was a partner in the firm of Colgate, Parker & Co. with Craig Colgate, Prescott Erskine Wood, Henry S. Parker, Frank Hamilton Davis and Darragh A. Park. In 1921, the firm reorganized as Parker & Company when Colgate, Wood and special partner Louis du Pont Irving withdrew; Fish then became a special partner.

=== Later life ===
In April 1927, Fish and his wife Olga purchased over 1,000 acres (400 ha), which they named the Palo Corona Ranch in Carmel Valley, California. The ranch was part of the Rancho San José y Sur Chiquito Mexican land grant to the west, with some inland areas within the Rancho Potrero de San Carlos land grant. Fish built a home and ranch on the property and ran a herd of Hereford cattle. In 1929, the ranch barn was designed and built by M. J. Murphy.

In the 1940s, the film National Velvet was partly filmed at the ranch. In the 1930s, Fish hosted Charles Lindbergh at the ranch and, in 1965, his son hosted Princess Margaret and the Earl of Snowden at the ranch for dinner. After his son's death, the ranch passed to his widow, Diana Fish.

== Personal life ==
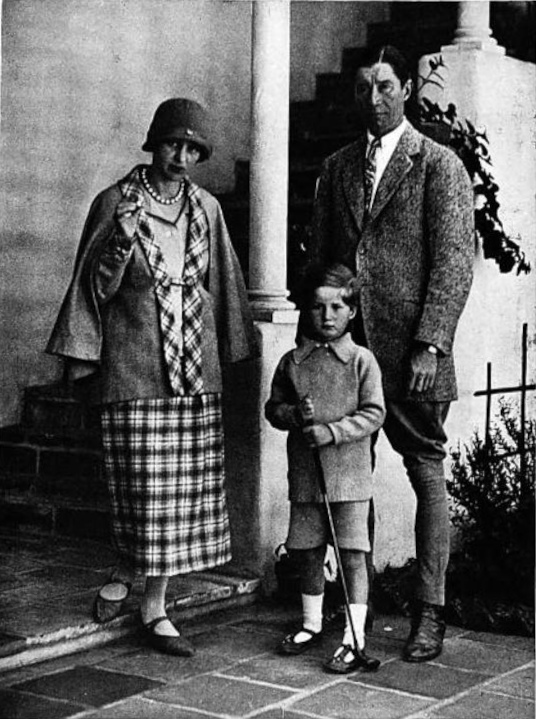
Sidney, his wife Olga, and their son, Sidney, 1926

On September 18, 1915, Fish married Olga Martha Wiborg (1890–1937) at St. Luke's Church in East Hampton, New York. The wedding was quiet due the recent death of his mother. They spent their honeymoon aboard Harold Vanderbilt's yacht Vagrant. Olga was a daughter of Frank Bestow Wiborg and sister to socialite Sara Sherman Wiborg and playwright Mary Hoyt Wiborg. They had a country home known as "Duck Pond" in Roslyn, New York adjoining the August Belmont place, and in North Hempstead, New York adjacent to the estates of Mrs. Frederick Guest, Clarence Mackay, and Harry Payne Whitney. They sold it in 1929, and bought a house in East Hampton, where they were known for their entertaining. Before her death, they were the parents of:

- Sidney Stuyvesant Fish (1921–1988), who married Virginia "Ginny" Small, a daughter of James Small of Pawtucket, Rhode Island, in 1954. They divorced in 1960. She later married Frank Rothwell, and he married Diana Fish.

In 1939, he married Esther (née Foss) Moore Roark (1894–1954), the daughter of Massachusetts Governor Eugene Noble Foss. She had previously been married to George Gordon Moore, a polo player whom she divorced in 1933, and Aiden Roark, another polo player whom she married in 1934 and divorced in 1937.

He died in Carmel on February 5, 1950, and was buried at Monterey City Cemetery. His widow died in November 1954.
