= George Hendric Houghton =

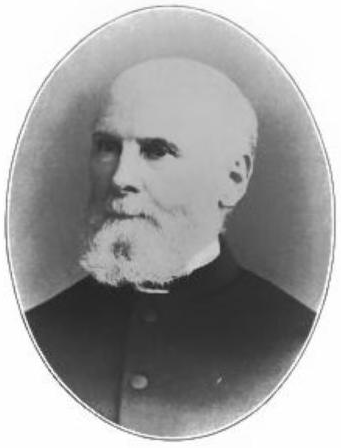
- Born: February 1, 1820; Deerfield, Massachusetts
- Died: November 17, 1897 (aged 77); New York, New York
- Education: New York University; General Theological Seminary
- Occupation: Clergyman

George Hendric Houghton (February 1, 1820 – November 17, 1897) was an American Protestant Episcopal clergyman.

== Biography ==
He was born in Deerfield, Massachusetts and graduated from New York University in 1842 and from the General Theological Seminary in 1845. He married Caroline Graves Anthon, daughter of John Anthon and aunt of Marion Graves Anthon Fish.

In 1848 he organized, and until his death was rector of, the Church of the Transfiguration, better known as the "Little Church around the Corner," in New York City.

The story which explains the origin of this name is that actor George Holland having died, his friends requested one of the city's pastors to conduct the funeral services. The latter refused but advised them to try the "little church around the corner," and Houghton obliged.

Houghton was distinguished for his activity in benevolent work and his skill in teaching Hebrew. For the latter, he was granted an honorary Doctor of Divinity degree by Columbia College in 1859.

During the New York Drafts Riots, Houghton sheltered a large crowd of Black New Yorkers fleeing the violence at his church. Together with the Bishop of Springfield, George Franklin Seymour, he kept vigil with the refugees, feeding and housing them in the library, the choir rooms, the schoolroom, and in the rooms over the chantry over the three days of rioting. Police in plainclothes came to warn him to turn the mob out, as they could not guarantee the safety of the church; Houghton refused, saying if the mob came, "I will stand at the door of the church. I don't think they will pass me."

Under his leadership, the Little Church became a favored destination for New York's Gilded Age elite. His wife Caroline's niece Marion Graves Anthon married Stuyvesant Fish in the church in 1876, and Caroline and William Astor were parishioners; their daughters Emily and Helen were in the 1869 confirmation class. Houghton was always focused, however, on service to the poor and needy in the city, and was known to walk the Five Points to offer pastoral care and confession to the destitute and struggling in the poverty-stricken parts of New York.

He died at the rectory adjoining the church on November 17, 1897. He was succeeded by his nephew, George Clarke Houghton.
