= Stuyvesant Fish House =

Stuyvesant Fish House refers to houses in Manhattan, New York City, that were built for, occupied by or otherwise connected with railroad executive Stuyvesant Fish and his family. The term may refer to:

- Hamilton Fish House – at 21 Stuyvesant Street, also known as Nicholas and Elizabeth Stuyvesant Fish House.
- 19 Gramercy Park South – a home on Gramercy Park that was re-designed by Stanford White; occupied by Stuyvesant Fish and his family from 1887 to 1898.
- Stuyvesant Fish House (78th Street, Manhattan) – at 25 East 78th Street at the corner of Madison Avenue, also designed by Stanford White; occupied by Stuyvesant Fish and his family after 1898.
