= Marion Graves Anthon Fish =

American socialite (1853–1915)

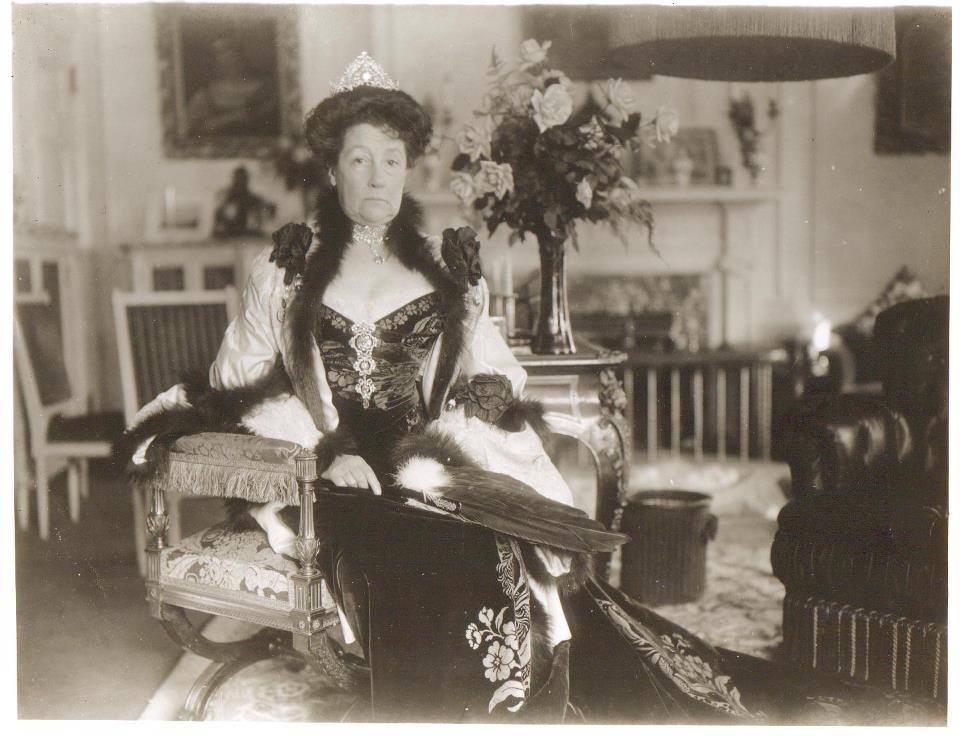
- Born: Marion Graves Anthon; June 8, 1853; Castleton, New York, US
- Died: May 25, 1915 (aged 61); Glenclyffe, New York, US
- Other names: "Mamie", Mrs. Stuyvesant Fish
- Spouse: Stuyvesant Fish (m. 1876)
- Children: 4, including Sidney Webster Fish
- Relatives: John Anthon (grandfather)

Marion Graves Anthon Fish (June 8, 1853 – May 25, 1915), often referred to as Mamie Fish or Mrs. Stuyvesant Fish, was an American socialite and self-styled "fun-maker" of the Gilded Age. She and her husband, Stuyvesant Fish, maintained stately homes in New York City and Newport, Rhode Island.

== Early life ==
Marion ("Mamie") Graves Anthon, as she was called, was born in the vicinity of Grimes Hill, New York, which at the time may have been known as Castleton Heights, in Castleton, New York. At the time this was a town in Richmond County, New York. That area, along with the rest of Richmond County of Staten Island, later became part of New York City.

She was the daughter of Sarah Attwood Meert and General William Henry Anthon, a successful lawyer and Staten Island assemblyman, who served during the Civil War. Her paternal grandfather was the jurist John Anthon. Mamie was of Dutch, English, French and German ancestry. She grew up on Irving Place in Manhattan and received only a rudimentary education and, by her own admission, could barely read and write.

== Society hostess ==
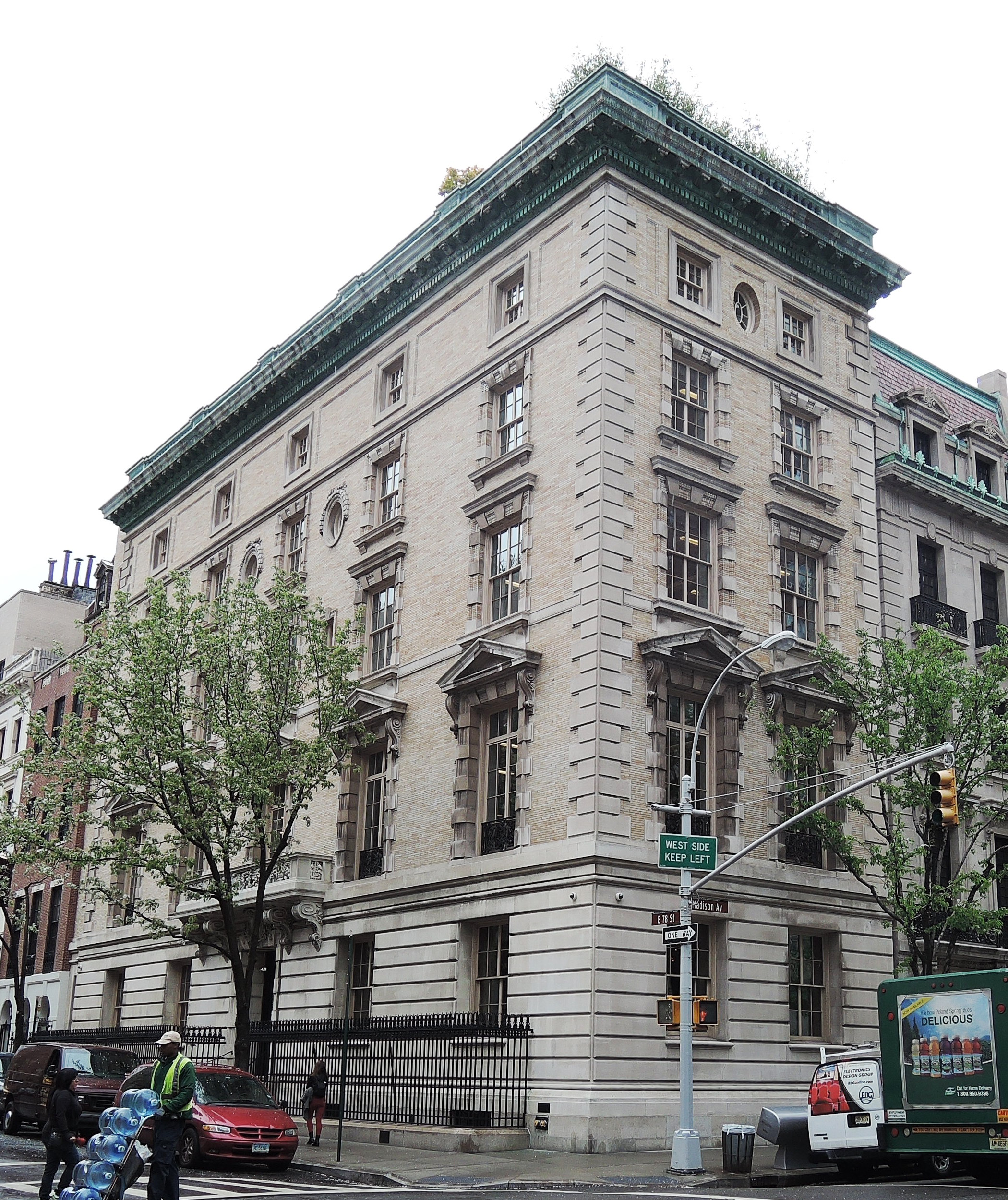
Stuyvesant Fish House at 25 East 78th Street, in New York City

Fish ruled as one of the so-called Triumvirate of American Gilded Age society (the "Four Hundred"), along with Alva Vanderbilt Belmont and Tessie Oelrichs. By virtue of her quick wit and sharp tongue, she became a notable leader of high society - in New York City at her townhouse at 25 East 78th Street; at her stately home Glenclyffe in Philipstown, New York; and at her mansion Crossways in Newport, Rhode Island. Grandees attending her dinner parties would be greeted with the occasional insult, "Make yourself perfectly at home, and believe me, there is no one who wishes you there more heartily than I do." One man was greeted with "Oh, how do you do! I had quite forgotten I asked you!"

Harry Lehr, an American socialite, often served as a co-planner of outrageous parties. A widely repeated story says that one was given in honor of "Prince Del Drago of Corsica", who turned out to be a well-dressed monkey introduced by Joseph Leiter. Given too much champagne, the monkey proceeded to climb the chandelier and throw light bulbs at the guests. But Lehr "denied that he had ever given such a dinner", although in 1905, it was said to have taken place the year before. At another of Fish's parties, dancers holding peanuts would feed an elephant she rented as they danced around it.

Fish's cattiness respected no rank. When Theodore Roosevelt's wife Edith sought to keep a frugal household, Fish was quoted as condescendingly saying of Mrs. Roosevelt "It is said [she] dresses on three hundred dollars a year, and she looks it."

== Personal life ==
On June 1, 1876, Mamie married Stuyvesant Fish, the director of the National Park Bank of New York City and president of the Illinois Central Railroad. He was the son of Hamilton Fish. Their marriage was held at the Church of the Transfiguration. Together, they had four children, three of whom lived to adulthood:

- Livingston Fish (1879–1880), who died at six months
- Marian Anthon Fish (1880–1944), who married Albert Zabriskie Gray (1881–1964), the son of Judge John Clinton Gray, on June 12, 1907. They divorced on December 5, 1934.
- Stuyvesant Fish Jr. (1883–1952), who married Isabelle Mildred Dick (1884–1972), daughter of Evans Rogers Dick, in 1910
- Sidney Webster Fish (1885–1950), who married Olga Martha Wiborg (1890–1937), daughter of Frank Bestow Wiborg, in 1915. In 1939, he married Esther Foss, the daughter of Gov. Eugene Noble Foss. She had previously been married to George Gordon Moore, a polo player whom she divorced in 1933, and Aiden Roark, another polo player whom she married in 1934 and divorced in 1937.

Mamie died on May 25, 1915, and is buried near Glenclyffe at the Church of St. Philip-in-the-Highlands. Her Newport "summer cottage", Crossways, is now a condominium.

== In popular culture ==
In the HBO series The Gilded Age, Mamie Fish is portrayed by actress Ashlie Atkinson.
