= Church of the Transfiguration, Episcopal (Manhattan) =

Church in Manhattan, New York

Church of the Transfiguration
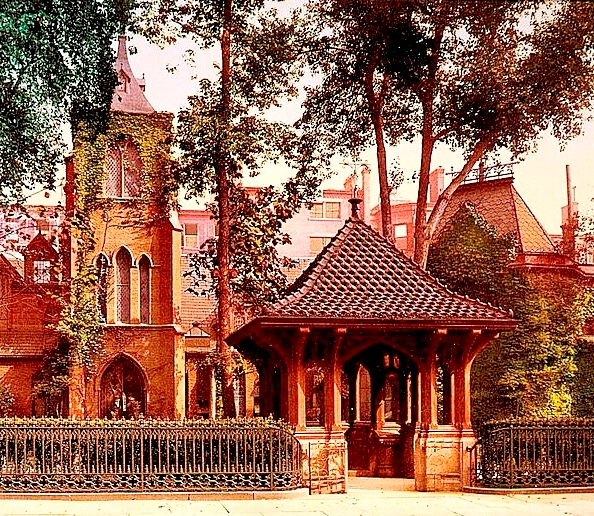
- (c. 1900)
- Church of the Transfiguration
- Location: 1 East 29th Street; Manhattan, New York City
- Denomination: Episcopal Church
- Churchmanship: Anglo-Catholic
- Website: www.littlechurch.org

Administration
- Province: Atlantic
- Diocese: New York
- Deanery: Manhattan Midtown

Clergy
- Rector: John David van Dooren
- Priest(s): Patrick S. Cheng; Warren C. Platt
- Church of the Transfiguration and Rectory
- U.S. National Register of Historic Places
- New York State Register of Historic Places
- New York City Landmark
- Location within Manhattan
- Coordinates: 40°44′43″N 73°59′10″W
- Built: 1849
- Architect: lych-gate only: Frederick Clarke Withers all other structures: unknown
- Architectural style: Gothic Revival
- NRHP reference No.: 73001216
- NYSRHP No.: 06101.000421
- NYCL No.: 0471, 2133

Significant dates
- Added to NRHP: June 4, 1973
- Designated NYSRHP: June 23, 1980
- Designated NYCL: May 25, 1967

The Church of the Transfiguration, also known as the Little Church Around the Corner, is an Episcopal parish church located at 1 East 29th Street, between Madison and Fifth Avenues in the NoMad neighborhood of Manhattan, New York City. The congregation was founded in 1848 by George Hendric Houghton and worshiped in a home at 48 East 29th Street until the church was built and consecrated in 1849.

The church was designed in the early English Neo-Gothic style; the architect has not been identified. The sanctuary is set back from the street behind a garden which creates a facsimile of the English countryside and which has long been an oasis for New Yorkers, who relax in the garden, pray in the chapel, or enjoy free weekday concerts in the main church. The complex has grown somewhat haphazardly over the years, and for this reason it is sometimes called the "Holy Cucumber Vine". The sanctuary had a guildhall, transepts, and a tower added to it in 1852, and the lych-gate, designed by Frederick Clarke Withers, was built in 1896. Chapels were added in 1906 (lady chapel) and 1908 (mortuary chapel). The Edwin Booth memorial stained glass window, given by The Players in 1898, is by John LaFarge. Other stained glass windows are by Karl Stecher.

In 1967, the church was designated a New York City landmark, and it was listed on the National Register of Historic Places in 1973.

== Early years ==
In 1863, during the Civil War Draft Riots, Houghton gave sanctuary to African Americans who were under attack, filling up the church's sanctuary, schoolroom, library and vestry. When rioters showed up at the church, Houghton is reported to have turned them away and dispersed them by saying, "You white devils, you! Do you know nothing of the spirit of Christ?" Over the three days of rioting, Houghton fed and prayed with those taking refuge in the church, assisted by George Franklin Seymour, Bishop of Springfield.

The church became a popular destination for fashionable society in New York's Gilded Age. Caroline Schermerhorn Astor and William Backhouse Astor Jr. were communicants, walking to services from their mansion at Fifth Avenue and 33rd Street, and the wedding of Marion Graves Anthon Fish and Stuyvesant Fish was held in the church in 1876. Names in the registers of the church included leading names of the day, including Rhinelander, Gould, Delafield, Vanderbilt, Zabriskie, Schuyler, and Roosevelt; William and Caroline Astor's daughters Helen and Emily were in the confirmation class of 1869.

== Ties to theater and arts ==
Actors were among the social outcasts whom Houghton befriended. In 1870, William T. Sabine, the rector of the nearby Church of the Atonement, which is no longer extant, refused to conduct funeral services for an actor named George Holland, suggesting, "I believe there is a little church around the corner where they do that sort of thing." Joseph Jefferson, a fellow actor who was trying to arrange Holland's burial, exclaimed, "If that be so, God bless the little church around the corner!" and the church began a longstanding association with the theater.

The church also attracted literary figures in the city. The author Stephen Vincent Benét attended the church with his family. P. G. Wodehouse, when living in Greenwich Village as a young writer of novels and lyrics for musicals, married his wife Ethel at the Little Church in September 1914. Subsequently, Wodehouse would set most of his fictionalized weddings at the church; and the hit musical Sally that he wrote with Jerome Kern and Guy Bolton ended with the company singing, in tribute to the Bohemian congregation: "Dear little, dear little Church 'Round the Corner / Where so many lives have begun, / Where folks without money see nothing that's funny / In two living cheaper than one."

In 1923, the Episcopal Actors' Guild held its first meeting at Transfiguration. Such theatrical greats as Basil Rathbone, Tallulah Bankhead, Peggy Wood, Joan Fontaine, Rex Harrison, Barnard Hughes, and Charlton Heston have served as officers or council members of the guild. The Little Church's association with the theatre continued in the 1970s, when it hosted the Joseph Jefferson Theatre Company, which gave starts to actors such as Armand Assante, Tom Hulce, and Rhea Perlman.

As well as being a guild officer, Sir Rex Harrison was memorialized at the church upon his death in 1990. Maggie Smith, Brendan Gill, and Harrison's sons, Carey and Noel, spoke at the service.

In 2023, the church opened the Houghton Hall Arts Community rehearsal space.

== Rectors ==
The church is known for the long service of its rectors: in the 150 years from its founding to 1998, there were five, including the Rev. Jackson Harvelle Randolph Ray from 1923 to 1963. More recently, the Rt. Rev. Andrew St. John was rector from 2005 to 2016, and the Rev. John David van Dooren has been rector since 2017.

== Membership ==
The church reported 300 members in 2016 and 198 members in 2023; no membership statistics were reported in 2024 parochial reports. Plate and pledge income reported for the congregation in 2024 was $366,027, with average Sunday attendance (ASA) of 115 persons. This figure was steady over the preceding decade, with ASA of 118 reported in 2015 and 117 in 2020.

== Music program ==
The church has long been associated with a program of free music performances. The Anglican tradition of a men's and boys' choir has been maintained, with special music for concerts and summer services provided by a choir of mixed voices. In 1988, the Arnold Schwartz Memorial organ, a new tracker pipe organ, was built and installed at the church by C. B. Fisk, Inc.

== In popular culture ==
- A key scene, a wedding between characters played by Neil Hamilton and Mary Brian, in the 1925 Herbert Brenon–directed silent film The Street of Forgotten Men was shot at the church. Parts of the church's facade and lich-gate are seen in the film, and the lich-gate is shown on one of the film's lobby cards.
- The church is alluded to at least twice in James Joyce's Finnegans Wake, as "tin choorch round the coroner" (67.13) and "ye litel church rond ye corner" (533.23–4).
- In 1986, the church was featured in an episode of The Equalizer titled "Shades of Darkness".
- In Woody Allen's Hannah and Her Sisters, Allen attends a concert in the main sanctuary while attempting to convert to Catholicism.

== Gallery ==
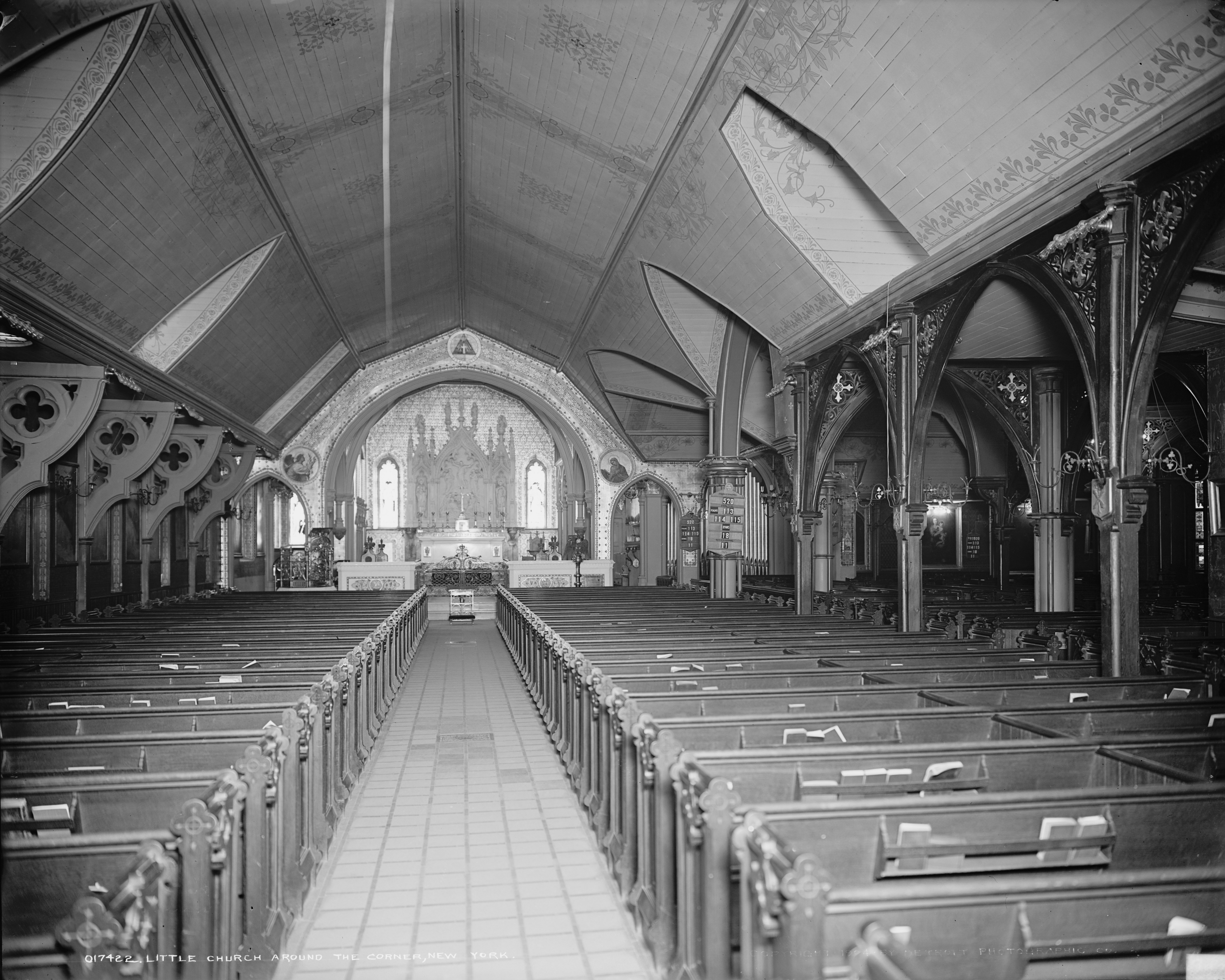
Interior of the church

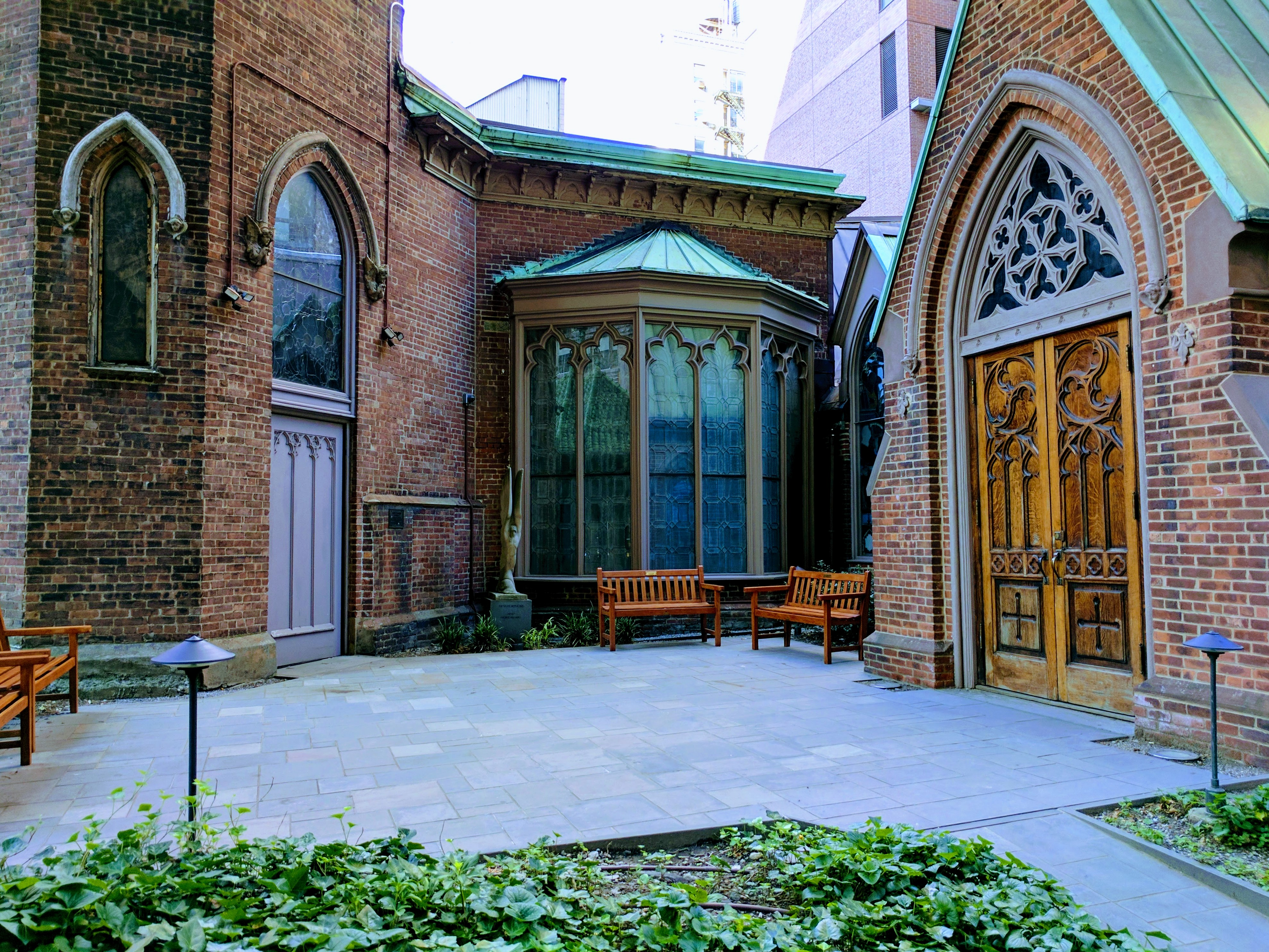
East end of the courtyard

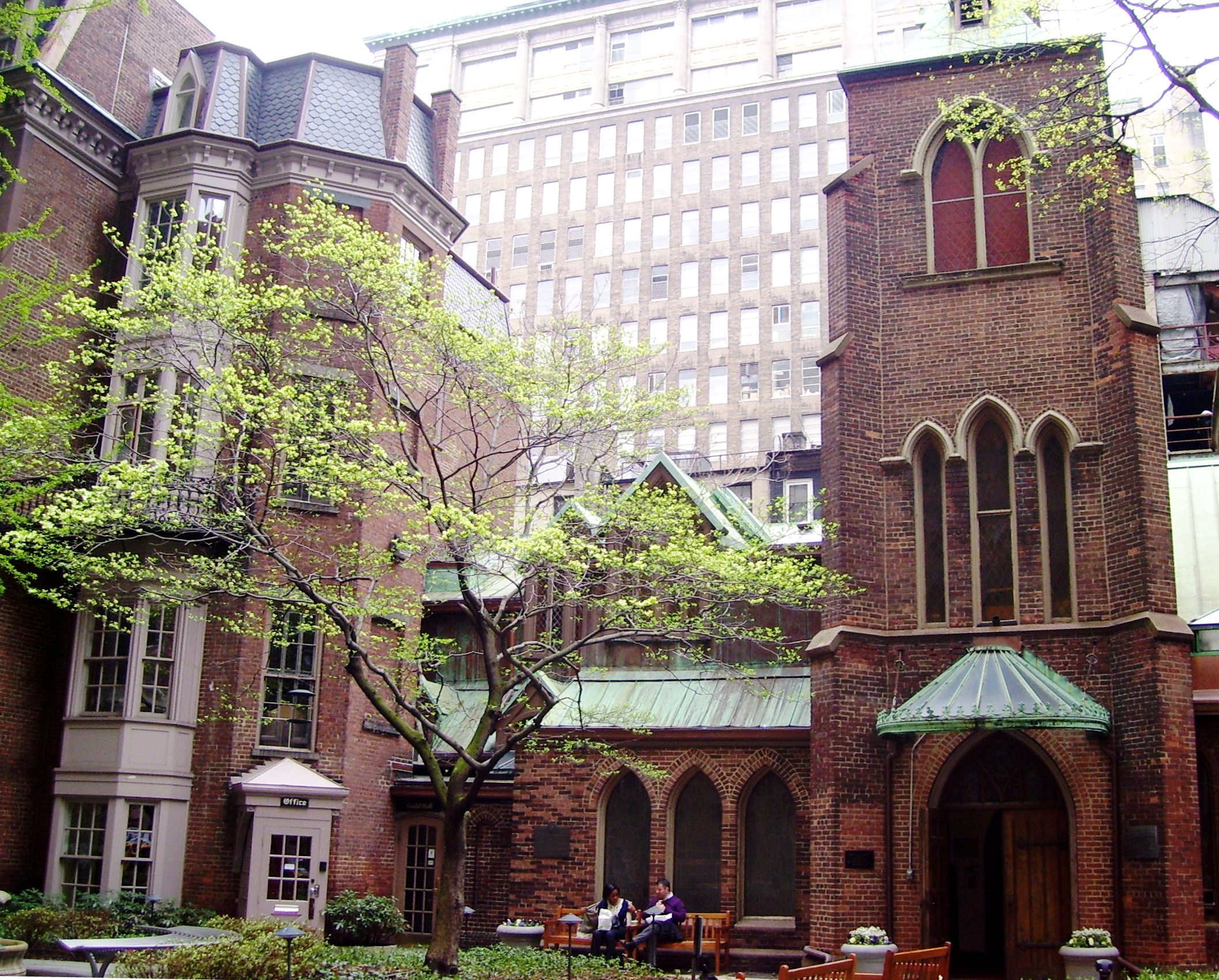
West end of the courtyard

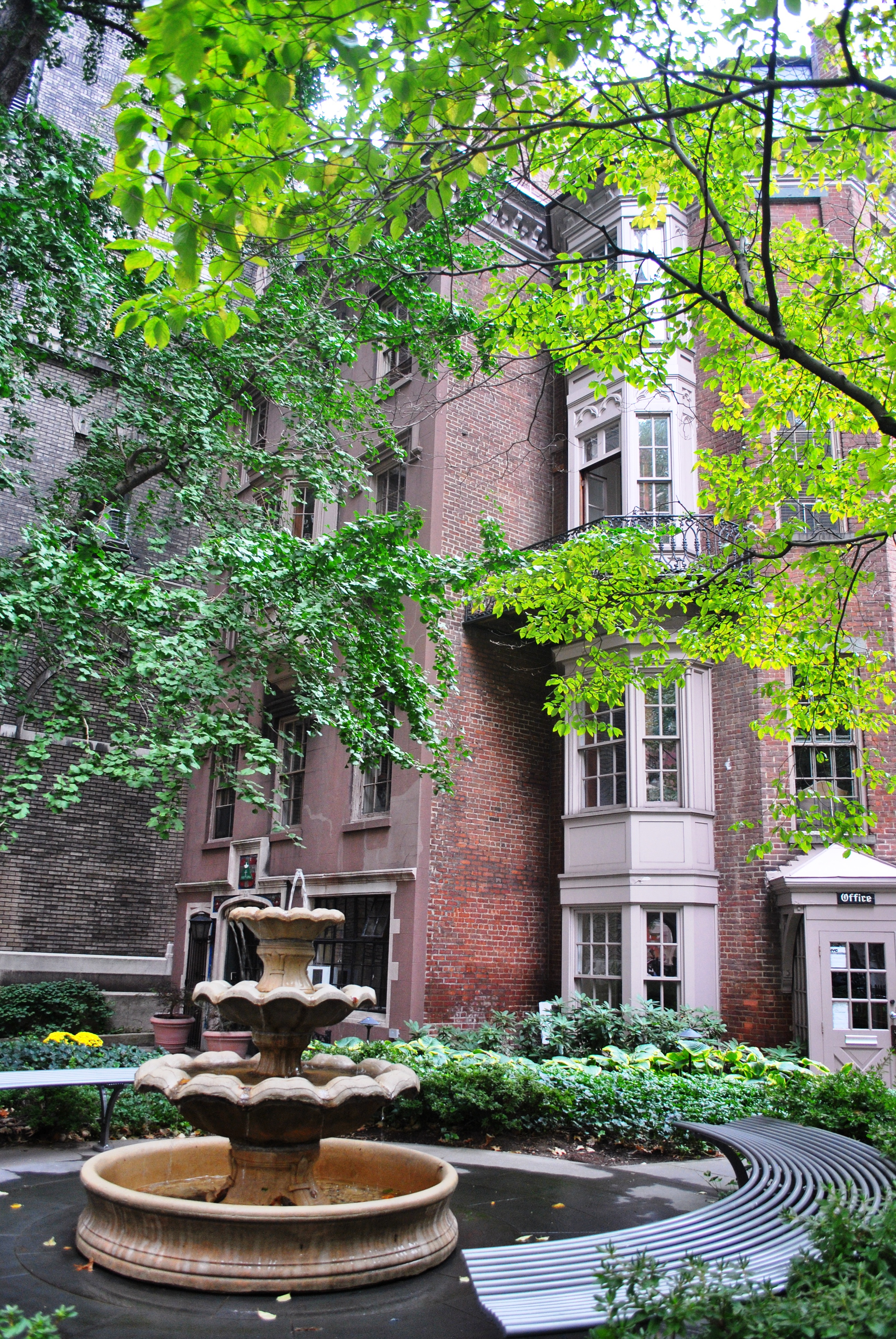
Church of the Transfiguration and rectory

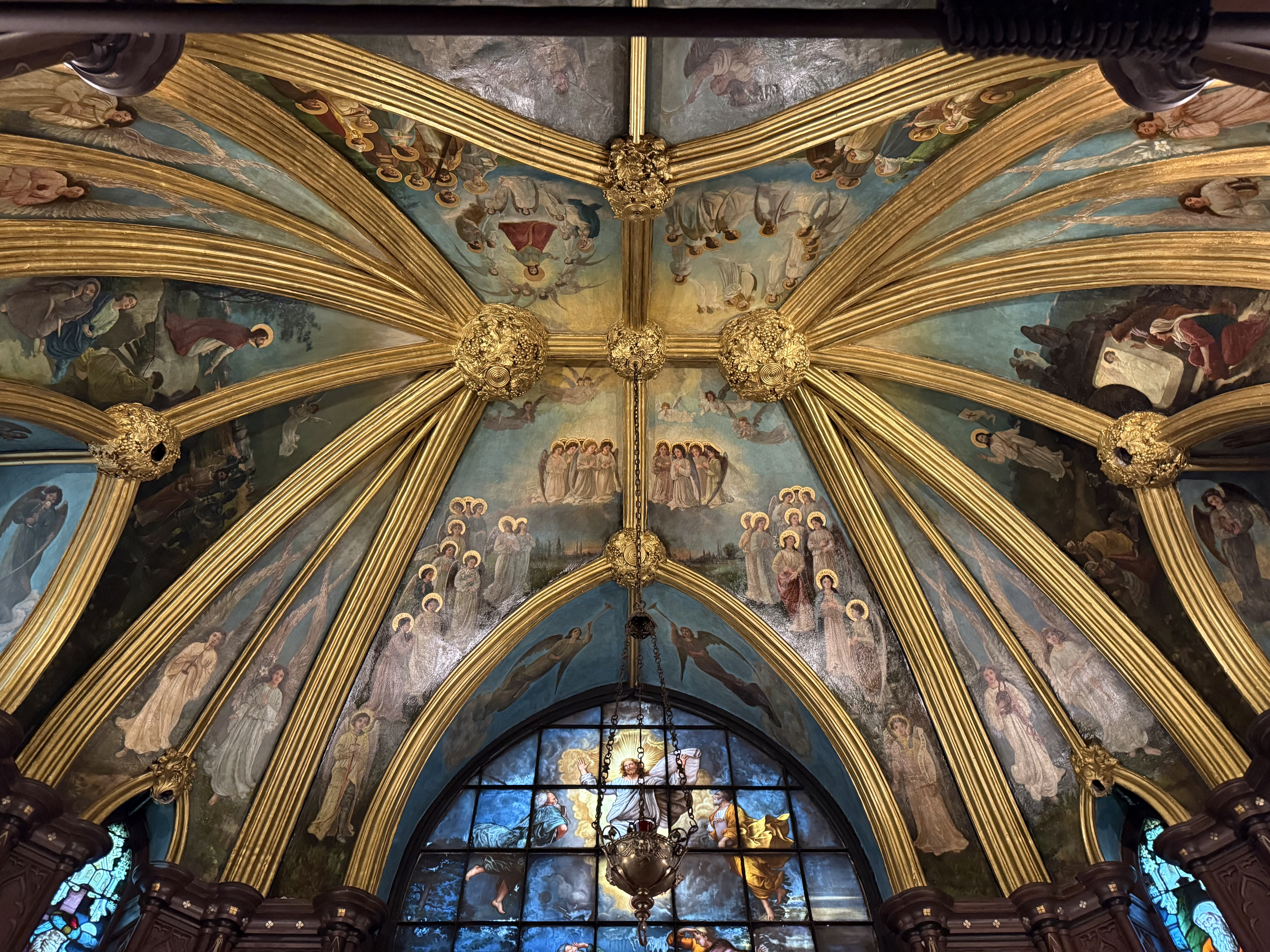
The St. Joseph of Arimathea Chapel ceiling

== See also ==
- List of New York City Designated Landmarks in Manhattan from 14th to 59th Streets
- National Register of Historic Places listings in Manhattan from 14th to 59th Streets
