= James Theodore Harahan =

Former president of the Illinois Central railroad 1841-1912

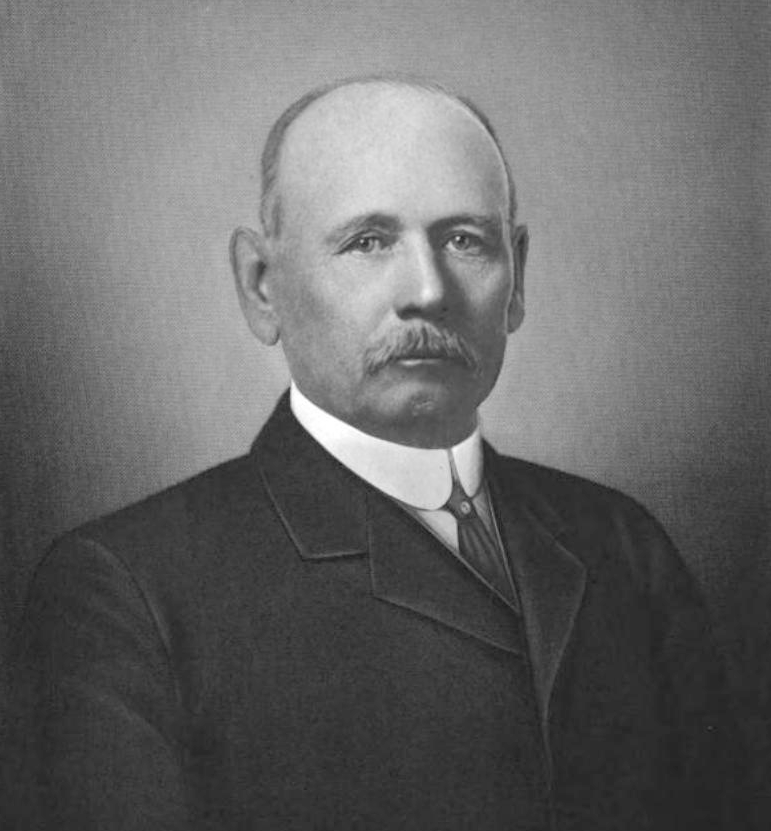
- Born: January 12, 1841; Lowell, Massachusetts, U.S.
- Died: January 22, 1912 (aged 71); Kinmundy, Illinois, U.S.
- Resting place: Forest Hill Cemetery, Memphis, Tennessee, U.S.
- Occupation: Businessman
- Spouses: Mary Kehoe (m. 1866; died 1897) Mary N. Mallory (m. 1899)
- Children: 4

James Theodore Harahan (1841–1912) was an American businessman. He was the president of the Illinois Central Railroad from 1906 to 1911.

== Early life ==
Harahan was born on January 12, 1841, in Lowell, Massachusetts, the son of Thomas Harahan and Ann née McCuen of Scotch-Irish ancestry, both immigrants from Ireland.

== Career ==
Harahan worked for railroad companies as a young man, including as a brakeman, eventually becoming president of the Illinois Central Railroad from November 7, 1906, to 1911, succeeding Stuyvesant Fish.

Harahan served as a captain in the Union Army during the American Civil War.

== Personal life ==
Harahan married to Mary Kehoe of New Orleans, Louisiana in 1866. Four children were born of this marriage including his son, William Johnson Harahan, who was born in Nashville, Tennessee, on December 22, 1867, and was twice president of the Chesapeake and Ohio Railway; he died of natural causes in 1937 in Clifton Forge, Virginia.

Mary died in 1897. Harahan's second marriage was to Mary N. Mallory of Montgomery County, Tennessee on April 14, 1899.

== Death and legacy ==
James Harahan was killed in a train accident, in his own private railroad car, on January 22, 1912, in Kinmundy, Illinois, while en route to Memphis, Tennessee, with three other railroad executives. They were traveling to a meeting to discuss the building of a railroad bridge across the Mississippi River at Memphis. The bridge was later named Harahan Bridge when it opened in 1916. The four men were sleeping in the private car which was at the end of the train. They were struck from behind by the engine of Train No. 3, The Seminole Limited. The locomotive pulling Harahan's car was previously driven by legendary railroad engineer Casey Jones during the fatal collision of April 30, 1900, in Vaughn, Mississippi, in which Jones was killed. The city of Harahan, Louisiana, is also named after him.

Harahan is buried at Forest Hill Cemetery in Memphis, Tennessee.
