= 19 Gramercy Park South =

Building in New York, United States

Coordinates: 40°44′15″N 73°59′9.8″W

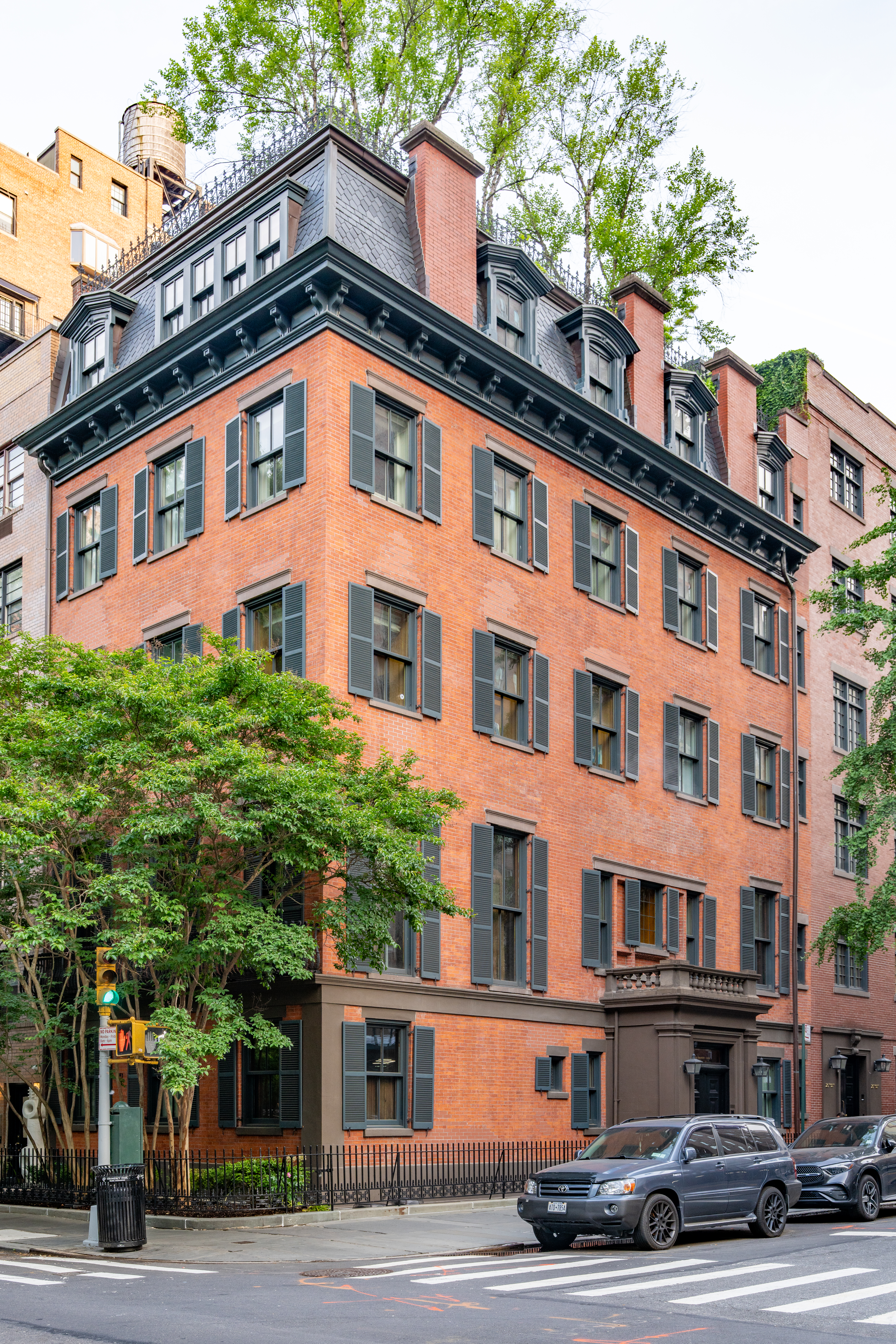
Northern portion of 19 Gramercy Park (2025)

19 Gramercy Park South, also known as 86 Irving Place or the Stuyvesant Fish House, is a four-story row house located at the corner of Gramercy Park South (East 20th Street) and Irving Place in the Gramercy Park neighborhood of Manhattan, New York City.

== History ==
The house was built in 1845 by William Samuel Johnson, a Whig politician, and then had the address 86 Irving Place. Johnson sold the property to Horace Brooks, who added a fifth story and constructed a stable on the unused southern part of the property. The census of 1880 shows a number of different people living at the address, suggesting that it had been converted into apartments by that time.

In 1887, this modest property was expanded and altered by noted architect Stanford White at the cost of $130,000 into a mansion with an interior marble staircase and a ballroom on the top floor where Mamie Fish gave elaborate parties for New York society. The building was also re-numbered 19 Gramercy Park, an address which had not existed prior to that time.

The Fish family left for their new 78th Street home in 1898, and the building was broken up into small apartments; actor John Barrymore was a resident while he was in New York working on Broadway. Occupants at other times included playwright Edward Sheldon and William C. Bullitt, the diplomat, journalist and novelist. In 1909, a six-story apartment building was constructed on the southern part of the lot.

The building was rescued from decay in 1931 by noted publicist Benjamin Sonnenberg when he and his wife rented the first two floors, gradually expanding and taking over other apartments. In 1945, Sonnenberg bought the entire building from Fish's son, Stuyvesant Fish Jr., for $85,000, and combined it with the apartment building to the south to create a massive residence which noted architecture critic Brendan Gill called "the greatest private house remaining in private hands in New York." The mansion was extensively furnished with Sonnenberg's collection of English and Irish furniture, drawings by Old Masters and sculptures. Like the Fishes, Sonnenberg gave notable parties which brought old-money New York together with show business luminaries. The building was listed as a contributing property to the Gramercy Park Historic District in 1966.

Sonnenberg died in 1978, and the house was auctioned to Baron Walter Langer von Langendorff, the owner of Evyan Perfumes, although Dr. Henry Jarecki also bid on it. Von Langendorff sold it to fashion designer Richard Tyler and his wife, Lisa Trafficante, in 1995 for $3.5 million. After sprucing up the property, it was put on the market in January 2000 and sold to Jarecki in December 2000 for $16.5 million. Jarecki, a psychologist and entrepreneur was reported to plan to use the mansion as both a home and the headquarters for his family foundation.

== Rooms ==
The mansion in its current incarnation has 37 rooms, 18,000 square feet (1,700 m^{2}) of space, a separate caretaker's apartment, numerous bedrooms, bathrooms, guest suites, and sitting rooms, a drawing room, a library, two kitchens, a wine cellar and the ballroom on the top floor, which had been renovated by Tyler.

== In popular culture ==
- 19 Gramercy Park plays a central role in the 1970 illustrated novel Time and Again by American author Jack Finney. The main character, an advertising artist, travels back in time from 1970s New York City to January 1882, and rents a room at 19 Gramercy Park, which is a boarding house in the novel. It is described as "a plain three-story brownstone with white-painted window frames and a short flight of scrubbed stone steps with a black wrought-iron railing."
- In Iron Fist, Joy Meachum is shown to live at 19 Gramercy Park, and it is also revealed that Danny Rand grew up here as a child.

== See also ==
- 18 Gramercy Park, across the street to the west
- The Players (New York City), across the street to the west
- Samuel J. Tilden House, across the street to the west
