= 18 Gramercy Park =

Residential building in Manhattan, New York

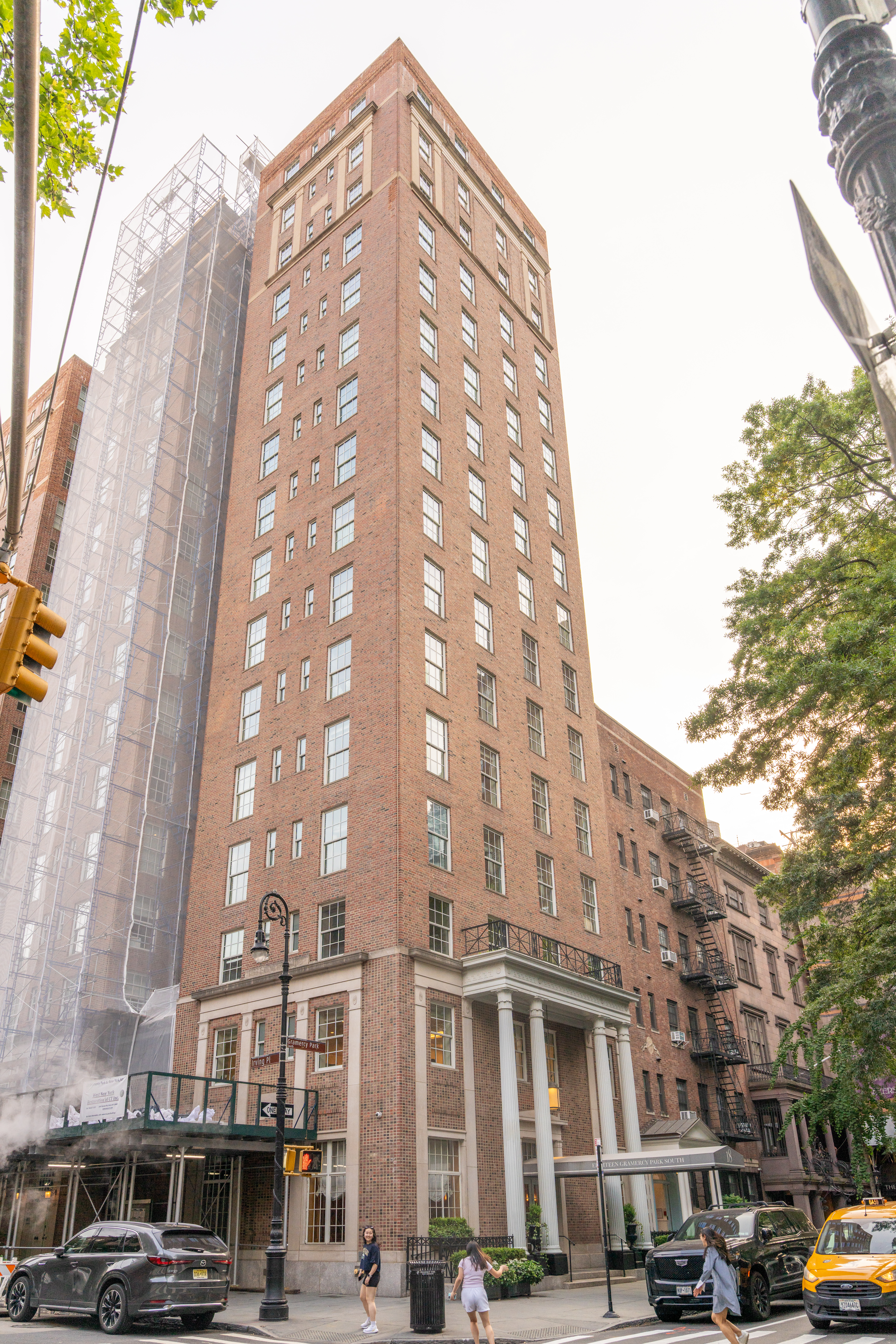
- 18 Gramercy Park
- Interactive map of the 18 Gramercy Park area

General information
- Location: 18 Gramercy Park South, Manhattan, New York City, U.S.
- Coordinates: 40.737654°N 73.986347°W
- Completed: 1927

Technical details
- Floor count: 19

Design and construction
- Architects: Murgatroyd & Ogden; Robert A.M. Stern Architects

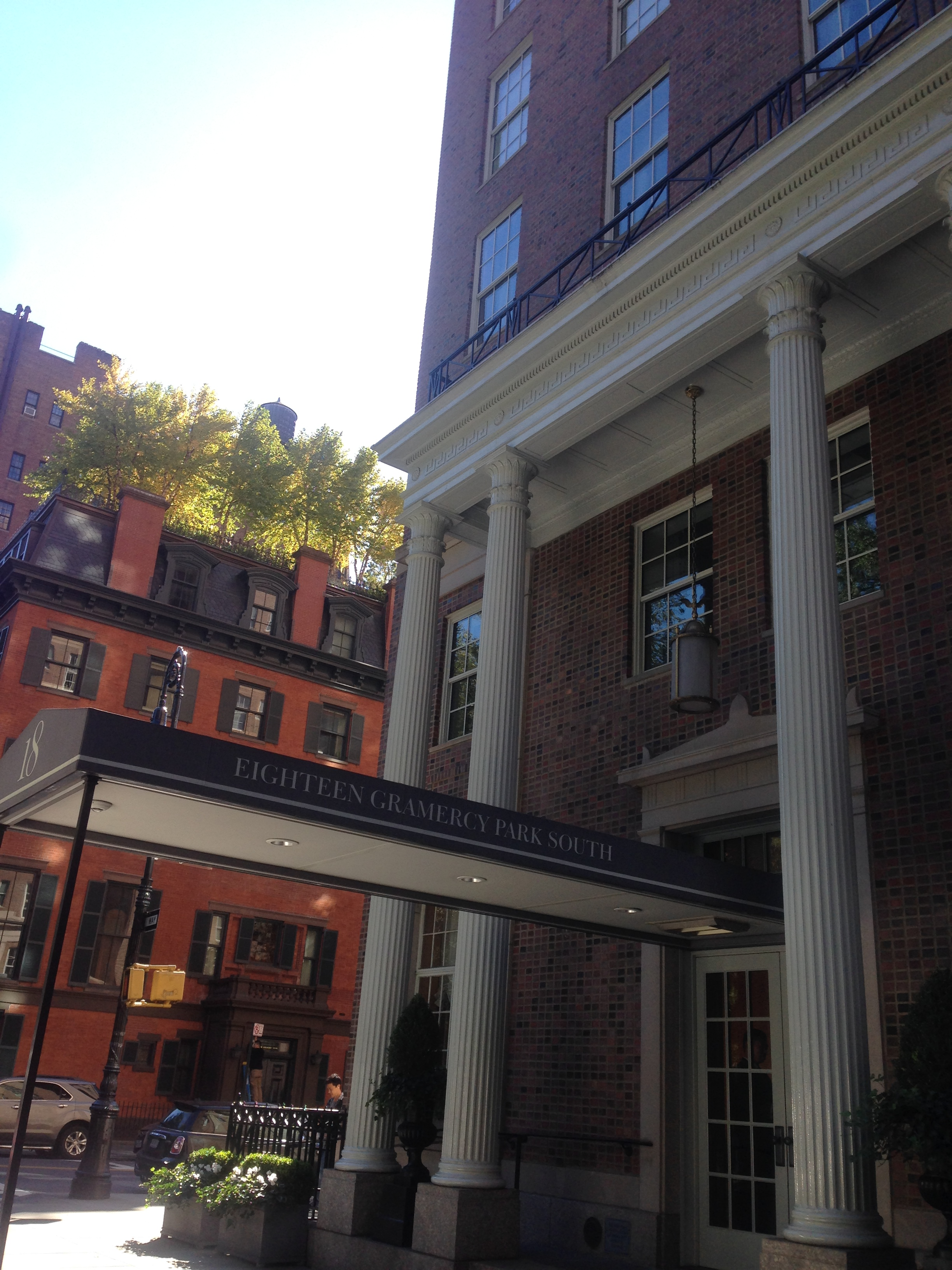

18 Gramercy Park is a 19-story residential building at 18 Gramercy Park South in Manhattan, New York City, United States. Built as a hotel in 1927 and designed by the architectural firm Murgatroyd & Ogden, it was a women's temporary residence owned by The Salvation Army from 1963 to 2008. It was then known as the Parkside Evangeline. In 2010, The Salvation Army sold the building to Eastgate Realty for US$60 million. The investors were the Zeckendorf family and Israeli billionaire Eyal Ofer.

In 2012, the building was redesigned by Robert A.M. Stern Architects as a luxury 16-unit condominium building. Residents have a key to Gramercy Park, a private park. Since September 2012, the building has sold all of its units (many of which are full-floor residences), with many costing more than US$4,000 per square foot, including the three-level maisonette with a private passage. The units feature marble showers, Miele dishwashers and thick white-oak floors. The building features two rooftop porches, a club room, spa and wellness center, 24-hour porter, full-time staff(including concierge) and four exposures with park and horizon views. Pets are permitted.

18 Gramercy Park units have reportedly sold for between $10 million and $42 million for the 6,329-square-foot (588.0 m^{2}) duplex penthouse.

== See also ==
- 19 Gramercy Park South, across the street to the east
- The Players (New York City), to the west
- Samuel J. Tilden House, to the west
