= John Hamilton Fulton =

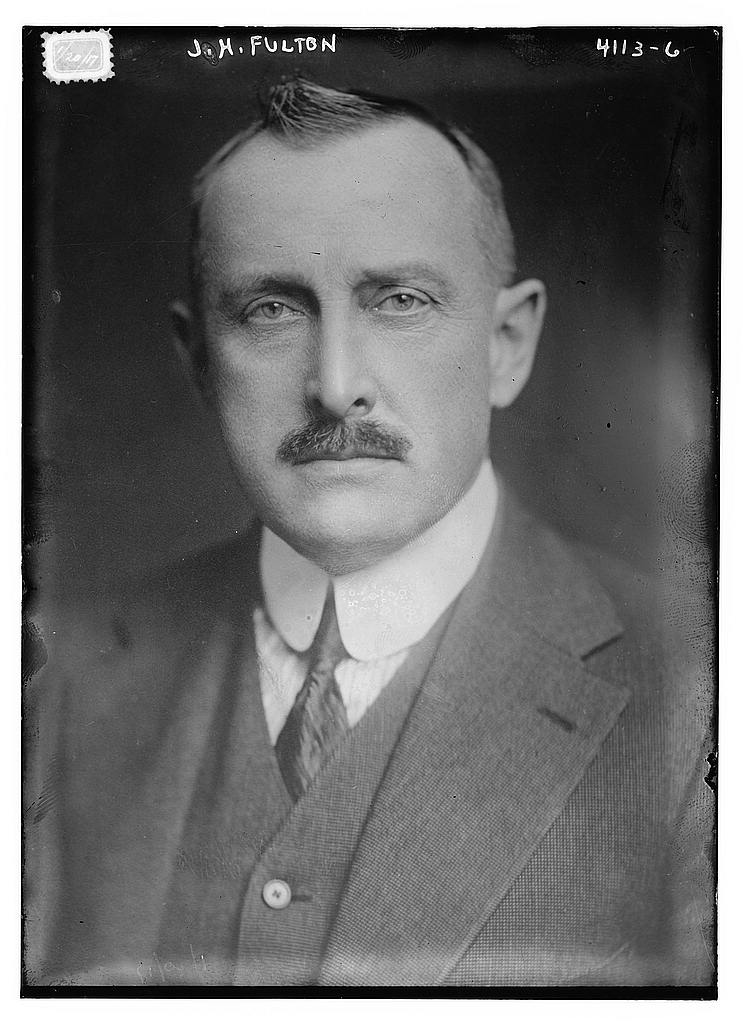

President of National Park Bank
- In office 1922–1927
- Preceded by: Richard Delafield

Personal details
- Born: November 12, 1869 Côte-des-Neiges; Montreal, Quebec, Canada
- Died: September 26, 1927 (aged 57) Essex, New York

John Hamilton Fulton (November 12, 1869 - September 26, 1927) was president of National Park Bank from 1922 to 1927.

== Biography ==
He was born on November 12, 1869, in Côte-des-Neiges in Montreal, Quebec, Canada, to Scottish parents.

When he was 17 years old, in 1886, he became a clerk at the Canadian Bank of Commerce where he detected a forgery and was promoted. In 1894 he was sent to the bank's New York City subsidiary as an accountant. He was then sent to the New Orleans, Louisiana subsidiary as the bank manager. In 1901 the state of Louisiana imposed punitive taxes on foreign owned banks. He became an American citizen and reorganized the bank as the Commercial Bank of New Orleans with himself as the manager. In 1902 he organized the Commercial Trust and Savings Bank, In 1919 the Commercial Trust and Savings Bank merged with Canal Bank to form Canal Bank and Trust.

In 1922 he was senior vice president at National City Bank. He was president of National Park Bank from 1922 to 1927 when he replaced Richard Delafield, who was promoted to chairman of the board.

He died on September 26, 1927, of a cerebral hemorrhage at his home, Bradlea Farm on Lake Champlain in Essex, New York.
