= John Anthon =

American jurist (1784–1863)

- Born: May 14, 1784; Detroit, Michigan
- Died: March 5, 1863 (aged 78); New York City, New York
- Education: Columbia College (1801)
- Occupations: Jurist, founder of New York Law Institute
- Spouse: Judith Hone (m. 1810)
- Children: 13
- Parents: George Christian Anthon (father); Genevieve Jadot (mother)
- Relatives: Charles Anthon (brother); Marion Graves Anthon (granddaughter)

John Anthon (May 14, 1784, in Detroit – March 5, 1863, in New York City) was an American jurist.

== Early life ==
Anthon was born in Detroit on May 14, 1784. He was the son of Geneviève Jadot (1763–1821), a descendant of Louis Hebert, one of the earliest European settlers of New France (present day Quebec), and George Christian Anthon (1734–1815), a German-American physician who served in the British Army during the American Revolution until the surrender of Detroit in 1796. He attained the rank of surgeon general, resigned, married the daughter of a French officer, and settled in New York City. His brother, Henry Anthon (1795-1861), was a noted clergyman. Another brother, Charles Anthon (1797–1867), was a noted educator and classical scholar.

In 1786, the family moved to New York where Anthon received a classical education, and then attended Columbia College from which he graduated in 1801 at the head of his class.

== Career ==
He then studied law, and, upon attaining his majority, was admitted to the bar in 1805. He started a practice in New York City around 1807, initially in the Mayor's (or Municipal) Court. He was a prominent defense attorney and, in his practice, was described thusly:

Anthon had the reputation of being the best practitioner at the New York bar. Although somewhat brusque in manner and possessed of a displeasing voice, he showed great skill in marshaling facts and in legal exposition and analysis."

During the War of 1812, he was in command of a company of militia, and served in the defence of New York City. He was also frequently employed during this period as judge advocate. The establishment of the Supreme Court of the City of New York is largely due to his efforts, he having successfully urged its necessity upon the state legislature. He was one of the founders of the New York Law Institute, becoming its president in 1852 and continuing until his death.

== Personal life ==
In 1810, he married Judith Hone (1792–1875). Together, they had thirteen children, including:

- George Anthon (1811–1816), who died young.
- Joanna Anthon (1814–1893), who died unmarried.
- Caroline Anthon (1814–1871)
- Geneviève Anthon (1816–1865), who married William Mott Callender in 1845.
- John Hone Anthon (1819–1821), who died young.
- Frederick Anthon (1820–1868)
- Charles Edward Anthon (1822–1883), a prominent numismatist.
- John Anthon
- Philip Hone Anthon (1825–1861)
- William Henry Anthon (1827–1875), a lawyer and Staten Island assemblyman who married Sarah Attwood Meert (d. 1911), daughter of Joseph Michel Meert, in 1850.
- Elizabeth Van Shaick Anthon (1828–1832), who died young.
- Edward Anthon (1831–1832), who died young.
- John Hone Anthon (1832–1874), a lawyer who served as Assistant District Attorney under A. Oakey Hall.

Anthon died on March 5, 1863, in Manhattan.

=== Descendants ===
Through his daughter Genevieve, he was the grandfather of William Stanhope Callender (d. 1900).

Through his son William, he was the grandfather of Marie Theresa Anthon (d. 1933), who married her cousin, William Stanhope Callender, and of the prominent socialite of the Gilded Age Marion Graves Anthon (1853–1915), who was married to Stuyvesant Fish (1851–1923), the director of the National Park Bank of New York City and president of the Illinois Central Railroad and was the son of Hamilton Fish (1808–1893), who served as a U.S. Representative, U.S. Senator, Lt. Governor of New York, Gov. of New York, and U.S. Secretary of State.

== Publications ==
- An Analytical Abridgment of Blackstone's Commentaries, with a prefatory essay "On the Study of Law" (2d ed., 1832)
- Reports of Cases at Nisi Prius in the New York Supreme Court (1820)
- Anthon's Law Student
- Digested Index to the Reported Decisions of the United States Courts (5 vols., 1813)
- American Precedents and Declarations (1810)
