= Benjamin Sonnenberg =

American public relations consultant

Benjamin Sonnenberg (born Baruch Sonenberg; July 12, 1901 – September 6, 1978) was an American public relations consultant who represented celebrities and major corporations. He was best known for the lavish entertaining he hosted for clients and other notables at his Manhattan townhouse located at 19 Gramercy Park South.

== Background ==
Sonnenberg was born in Brest-Litovsk, Russian Empire (now Belarus), to Polish Jewish parents, Harry (Arje) Sonenberg from Warsaw and Ida (Chaya) Sonenberg from Kowel (now Ukraine). He began his life living in poverty in a small wooden hut. His father immigrated to New York in 1905 and began work in dry goods; Sonnenberg, his mother, and his two younger sisters, Mary (Masche) and Belle (Beile), moved to Warsaw; they joined Harry in New York in 1910 via the SS Birma. The family lived on the Lower East Side of Manhattan, New York City.

Sonnenberg attended Public School No.62 and then DeWitt Clinton High School. He took part in drama and dance at Henry Street Settlement, where his mother was a cleaning lady. Miss Wald, the director, was very impressed with Ben. At the age of 16, she offered him a job as the leader of the boy's club, and in turn allowed him to continue his schooling and live at the settlement house. Two years later, Miss Wald helped him get a scholarship to study at Columbia College. He got a job covering Columbia University sports for the Brooklyn Eagle. This helped his writing skills to become a publicist.

He married Hilda Kaplan in March 1924. Brendan Gill, a close friend of Sonnenberg claimed, "Ben wanted to be remembered as he was in his prime." His will was written on December 7, 1977 after he learned he was terminally ill with throat cancer. The will directed his executors of this estate to destroy all his files and papers. Sonnenberg died in New York City at age 77 of a heart attack on September 6, 1978.

== Early career ==
Sonnenberg was unsatisfied by the challenge of college and answered an ad in The New York Times with the Chicago Portrait Company as a door-to-door salesman. He became bored and quit after two months. Then, he hitchhiked to Flint, Michigan where he worked as a reporter and movie critic for The Flint Journal. He returned to New York City in 1921.

Upon returning to New York City, his first work in the public relations field was writing stories for the American Jewish Joint Distribution Committee. In 1922, Miss Wald got a call from Lewis Strauss, the former secretary to Herbert Hoover and director of the American Relief Administration with the task to get food and medical assistance to the famine-stricken areas of Russia and Europe. Sonnenberg took the job where he realized what it was like to be rich, and he fell in love with the lifestyle that coincided. At the age of 22, he rented a room in Greenwich Village and made an earning by providing publicity for Jewish fund drives, writing stories for the American Jewish Joint Distribution Committee. He also did some public relations work for the Salvation Army, and a few night clubs.

== Public relations career ==
A self-described "cabinetmaker who fashioned large pedestals for small statues", Sonnenberg represented many clients. While his company, Publicity Consultants Inc., was nominally located in offices on Park Avenue, his real business was done in his five-story townhouse in the Gramercy Park neighborhood of Manhattan, where he was renowned for his lavish entertaining for his clients and his contacts in the press. As his son would later describe in his memoir Lost Property: Memoirs and Confessions of a Bad Boy, "our home, my home, was a stage for his work".

Sonnenberg was persuasive and successful with his clients, and they would often pay a fee just to talk with him on the phone. Moreover, he was often performative in entertaining and gifting his guests. Sonnenberg gained success and affluence because he was dedicated to following through on his promises to his clients, and because of this his reputation grew by word of mouth.

His first big break was when he persuaded Oscar Weintraub to hire him to promote the new Fifth Avenue Hotel. He helped make the hotel known by inviting a distinction of guests to visit including Trader Horn, Prince George Matchabelli, and the Grand Dutchess Marie Romanov. His success lead to Weintraub hiring him to promote the other two hotels Weintraub managed. This also lead to Sonnenberg's introduction to Joel Hillman who was about to open the George V Hotel in Paris, which became Sonnenbergs' first European account.

He became a full-time publicist in 1925. In 1927, he persuaded his father to retire because he felt financially secure and like he had "arrived." In 1929, he left Greenwich Village and opened his office in a more luxurious building at 247 Park Avenue. He incorporated as Publicity Consultants Inc. He kept his staff very small and hired freelancers as needed, but did much of the work himself. From 1929, his fee income was at least $250,000 a year and from 1942 to his death it was always at least half a million annually. By 1930, Sonnenberg and the field of Public Relations were becoming very well known. Sonnenberg made his clients look up to press agents, rather than looking down on them. He moved to No.19 in 1931 and rented out the two bottom floors and by 1945 he was able to afford the whole thing.

Perhaps his most famous client was Charles Luckman, an extremely successful architect, in 1950. "If there is one single achievement that public relations men cite Sonnenberg for, it is the media barrage that he engineered for Luckman, beginning with a Time cover piece." In 1927, Sonnenberg publicized Bergdorf Goodman department store for $100 a month. He was then hired to promote the 50th anniversary in 1951. He planned for a gala dinner dance in the Plaza Hotel with almost 700 or 800 in attendance. It was a sellout and tickets sold for $50. There was a live fashion show. There were also live mannequins in the store windows. Because of this great success he was then hired by Fred Lazares Jr. who operated Bloomingdale's, Abraham & Straus, Filene's of Boston, and Burdine's in Miami.

In the 1950s he counseled his friend Stanley Marcus, founder of Neiman Marcus, for free who stated, "I learned more from Ben Sonnenberg about life and business than from any other person except my father." Working for Pepperdine, Inc. made Sonnenberg a multimillionaire. Pepperdine, Inc was created by a poor family that made bread suitable for asthmatics and sold to Campbell Soup Co. in 1958 for $28 million, which earned him $9 million.

== Legacy ==
After 36 years of hustling clients and building a business, Sonnenberg closed down Publicity Consultants, Inc. in 1963, because 247 Park Avenue was being torn down and his right-hand man George Schreiber was terminally ill with a brain tumor. He became strictly a consultant and gradually reduced his number of clients. In his later years Sonnenberg focused less on making money and more on his hobbies, collecting being his favorite. He went for one last collecting jaunt to England in 1978 at the age of 76. In his final phase he worked alone. He claimed to have earned between $25 million to $30 million in his lifetime.

== Sources ==
- Barmash, Isadore. Always Live Better Than Your Clients: The Fabulous Life and Times of Benjamin Sonnenberg, America's Greatest Publicist. Dodd, Mead and Company.
- Scott Cutlip (1994) The Unseen Power: Public Relations: A History ISBN 0-8058-1464-7 .
