= New York Law Institute =

Law library in New York City

Coordinates: 40.70833°N 74.01111°W

The New York Law Institute

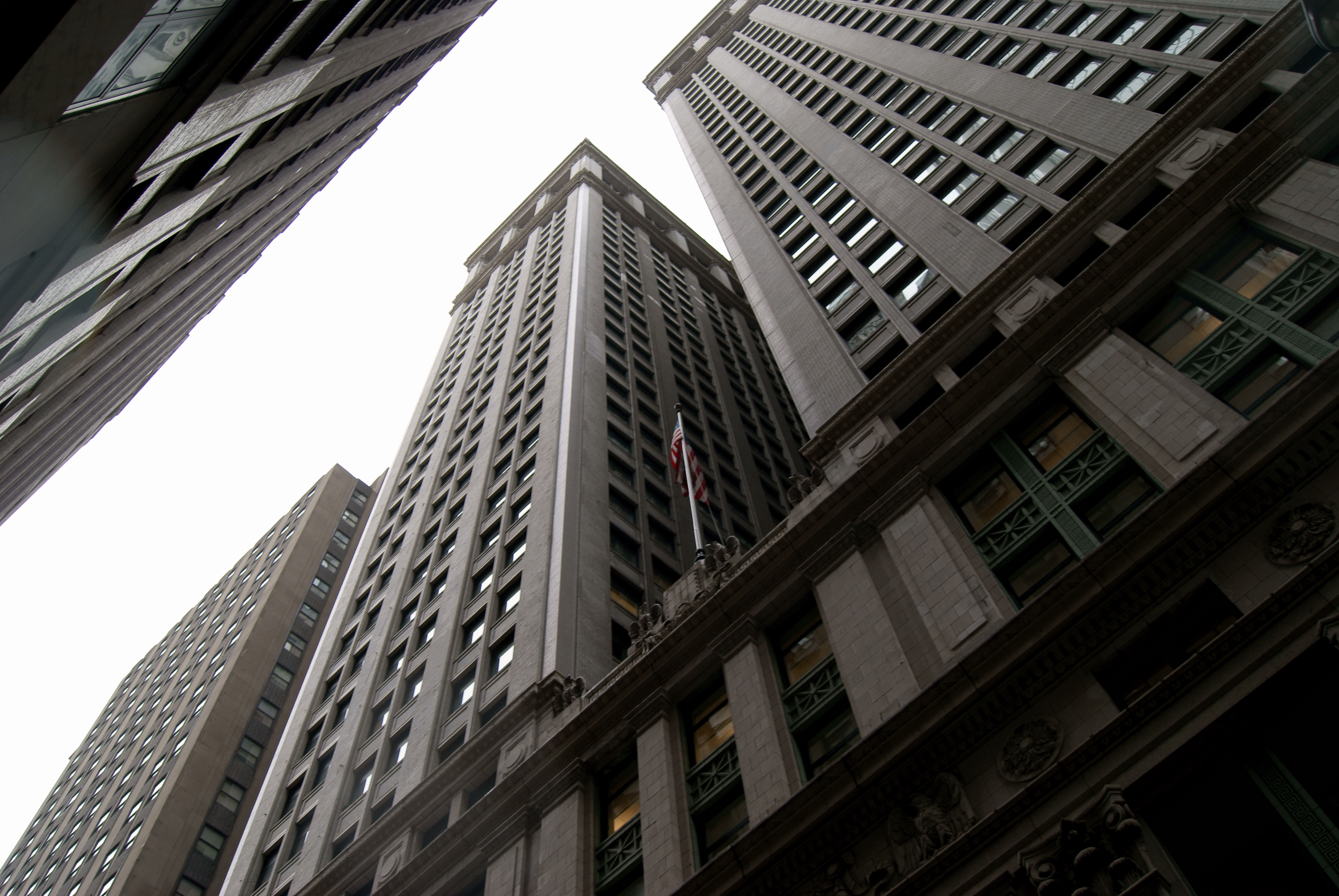
- Located in the Equitable Building
- Location: 120 Broadway, New York, NY
- Established: 1828

Collection
- Size: >250,000 cataloged books in the New York Law Institute's collection of monographs and serials, bound newspapers, pamphlets, supplements, Congressional documents, and other printed material, and many electronic resources.

Access and use
- Circulation: In 2017: 3717 print items, 2832 eBooks circulated
- Population served: 1834 individuals

Other information
- Director: Lucy Curci-Gonzalez (Executive Director)
- Website: www.nyli.org

The New York Law Institute is the oldest circulating law library in New York City and is open to Institute members and to scholars of history and the law.

== Today ==
The New York Law Institute library is located in the Equitable Building and has a circulating collection of over 250,000 print volumes, including Congressional documents, records on appeal, current and superseded U.S. and state laws, new and archival editions of legal treatises, and archival New York City and New York State materials. The library's collection also includes over 160,000 eBooks from Proquest and OverDrive, including legal, business, and engineering titles. Also available are numerous remote-access and on-site research databases such as CCH-Intelliconnect, Hein Online, LEXIS Advance, LLMC Digital, OED, ProQuest Congressional, and Westlaw Next.

== History ==
=== Origins (1828–1854) ===
In 1876, The Report on Libraries of the United States described the New York Law Institute Library as "the best public law library in this country", and a success in the highest and broadest sense. The Institute and its library were the result of the efforts of two young lawyers, George Sullivan and James W. Gerard, to break up the so-called "barrister ring" of twelve to fifteen lawyers who with the connivance of the judiciary monopolized all the worthwhile legal business in the circuit and supreme court, and the court of chancery during the mid-1820s. They achieved one of their goals when the legislature established the Superior Court in 1828, but they believed that to break up the ring for good, the establishment of a "Law Association" was essential.

This Law Association, renamed the Law Institute, was founded in February 1828. One of its main goals was the founding of a law library, a task that was considered essential since at that time the only significant collections of law books in New York were held privately by such notables as Chancellor James Kent and Chief Justice John Jay. Thus, listed in the charter granted by the legislature in 1830 was a provision for "providing a seminary of learning in the law and the formation of a Law Library". The founders also had the lofty aim of "guard[ing] the purity of the profession", but it became almost immediately apparent that this was beyond anyone's power, so the members' primary activity became the establishment of a law library that would contain "the law of the larger part of the civilized world".

=== Library champions (1854–1863) ===
The library received donations from various leading lawyers, including a copy of his Commentaries from Chancellor Kent, which is now designated as its "first book". However, the bulk of the collection appears to have been acquired through the purchase of the private library of attorney James Tillotson. The collection was first housed in New York's "Old City Hall", but by the early 1850s, the collection, now consisting of over 4,000 volumes, had outgrown its quarters. The Institute then petitioned the New York City Common Council for space in "New City Hall". This request was granted, but misfortune struck when the building, later described by a New York Times editorial as an "old rathole", was destroyed by fire in January 1854. Most of the library's books were removed after the first alarm, and only 82 were lost, but the blaze destroyed all the furniture and many valuable donated artifacts. For a time, the rescued books were stored in the courthouse basement, and were later moved to No. 45 Chambers St. and then to 41 Chambers St.

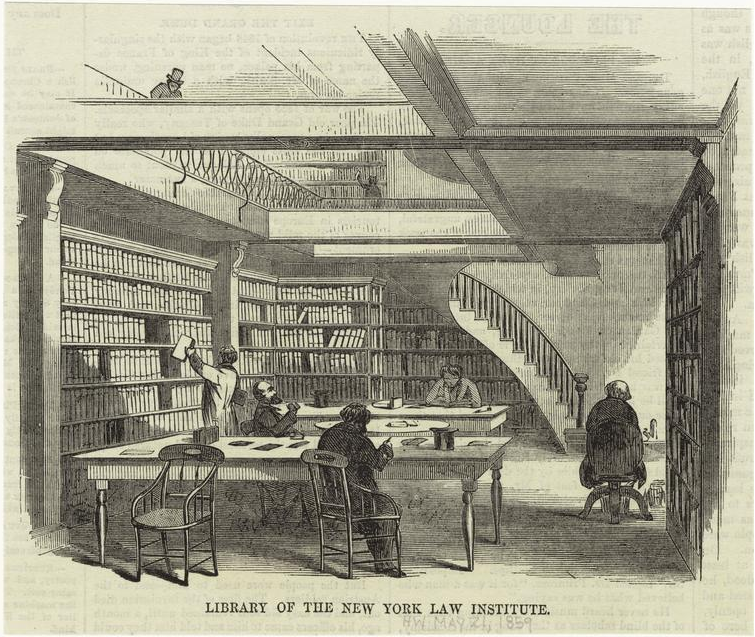
From Harper's Weekly, 1859

After the fire, the Library received major assistance from Charles O'Conor, a leading local attorney with pronounced pro-Southern, pro-slavery views, who after the Civil War volunteered to defend Jefferson Davis. Despite his reported lack of social skills, and curmudgeonly reputation, O'Conor was known for acts of generosity. He helped the library settle with insurers for $2,250, and loaned it a substantial amount of money. When he died in 1884, O'Conor left the library $21,000, and the multi-volume bound sets of "My Own Cases" and "My Own Opinions", relating to the most notable cases of his long career.

Another leading legal figure who took an interest in the development of the library was Judge John W. Edmonds, who "manifested the greatest interest in its welfare, and has contributed most substantially to its development and success". It was Edmonds who prepared the manuscript on which the first library catalog was based. Edmonds also compiled the Statutes at Large of the State of New York (1863) (popularly known as Edmond's Statutes), which sought to disentangle the Revised Statutes from a mass of other legislation, and Edmond's Select Cases, a compilation of cases over which he presided between 1834–1853. During his lifetime, the judge was also famous as a staunch believer in spiritualism, and once felt compelled to deny allegations that he consulted with the spirits before making decisions on the bench.

=== Expansion and relocation (1872–present) ===
In 1872, by which time the library had grown to over 25,000 volumes, it moved from its Chambers St. location to quarters in the new United States Post Office Building located at the southern end of City Hall Park. A large colonnaded mansard-roofed structure, the building was decidedly unpopular, and was dubbed "Mullet's Monstrosity", after its designer, United States supervising architect Alfred Bult Mullet. While located in the Post Office Building, the library paid no rent in exchange for free access for federal judges and United States district attorneys.

Under the leadership of long-time director William H. Winters, an 1868 Harvard Law School graduate, the library continued to grow rapidly. By 1887, the collection had grown to 35,000 volumes, necessitating the expansion of the library from one floor to two. During this period, the library reportedly spent $7,000 annually on new books and was expanding at the rate of about 1,000 volumes per year. In the subsequent decade, the library continued its steady growth, its collection totaling over 48,000 volumes by 1897. That year, a chapter in the two-volume History of the Bench and Bar of New York included a lengthy list of its rare and valuable titles, and noted that a recent press report had stated: "There is probably no other law library in this country which has upon its shelves so rich and valuable a collection of rare works on legal topics."

The library became a Federal Depository Library Program (FDLP) member in 1909 and the collection retains materials from that time through the present. The collection not only has the basic core collection of the FDLP, but also contains items such as the Warren Commission reports on the Kennedy assassination, the SEC report on Investment trusts and Investment Companies from 1938, and the 1999 Report on Mass Tort Litigation.

The much-maligned Post Office Building was torn down in 1938, but by then the Law Institute Library had moved again. In 1915, it relocated to its present home — another controversial structure — the 40-story Equitable Building at 120 Broadway, whose construction had prompted outrage and the promulgation of the Zoning Resolution of 1916 because of the seven-acre shadow it cast over its surroundings. At the time of its move to the Equitable Building, the library was said to hold over 99,000 volumes and it had grown to over 150,000 volumes by the late 1960s. NYLI added its first electronic resources during the 1990s and continues to expand its online offerings and databases.
