= Evans R. Dick =

American real estate investor

Evans Rogers Dick (August 18, 1858 – January 8, 1934) was an American real estate investor, member of the New York Stock Exchange and yachting enthusiast who was best known during his lifetime for guarding Americans during an uprising in Haiti.

== Early life ==
Dick was born on August 18, 1858, in St. Louis, Missouri. He was a graduate of the University of Pennsylvania and, early in life, he became involved in yachting. Among his brothers were William Dick and Frank M. Dick.

== Career ==
In 1911, when he was a member of the New York Stock Exchange firm known as Dick Brothers & Co., he was cruising near Haiti and discovered a political uprising had started on the island. "During the night all American women were aboard his vessel. The government was overthrown and after hostilities had ceased Mr. Dick left the harbor."

In 1914, Dick Brothers & Co. was dissolved and he became involved in real estate, primarily in Westchester County, New York, and financial interests. He also served as president of the Stamford Rolling Mills, in Stamford, Connecticut.

== Personal life ==
Dick was married to Elizabeth Thatham of Philadelphia. Together, they were the parents of:

- Isabelle Mildred Dick (1884–1972), who married Stuyvesant Fish Jr., a son of Stuyvesant Fish and society leader Marion Graves Anthon Fish, in 1910.
- Fairman Rogers Dick (1885–1976), who married Gladys Roosevelt, a daughter of John Ellis Roosevelt, in 1913. After her death, he married Elise Rosalys (née Urquhart) Duggan, widow of Philip Richard Duggan and daughter of Charles Robert Urquhart of New Orleans, in 1928.
- Evans Rogers Dick Jr. (1888–1967), who married Estelle Skibb.

Dick died in the Butterfield Memorial Hospital in Cold Spring, New York on January 8, 1934, near his residence in Garrison-on-Hudson.
