= Stuyvesant Fish House (78th Street, Manhattan) =

House in Manhattan, New York

Coordinates: 40°46′33″N 73°57′46″W

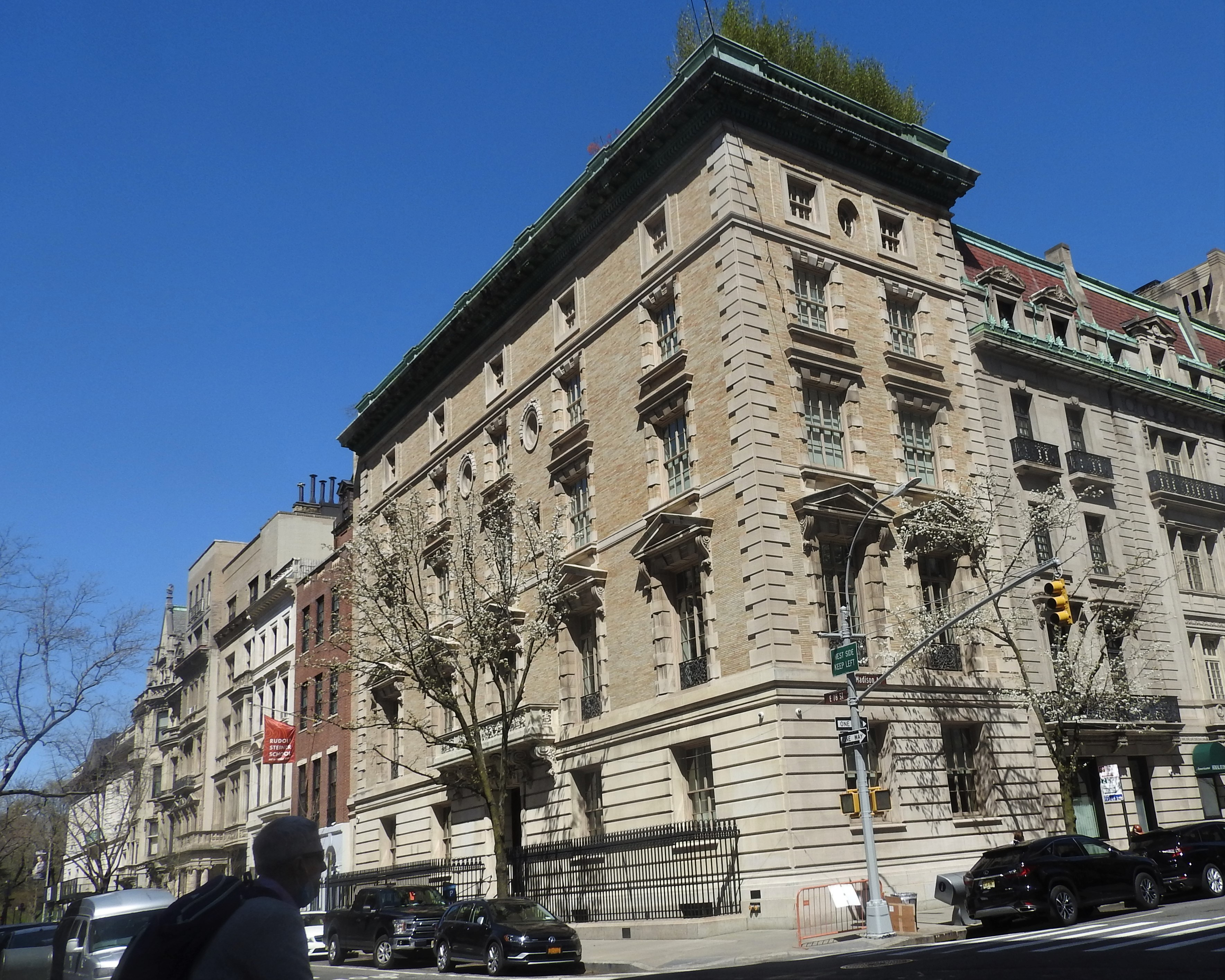
Stuyvesant Fish House

The Stuyvesant Fish House is a brick and limestone Italianate mansion located at 25 East 78th Street, at the corner of Madison Avenue in New York City. It was constructed for railroad executive Stuyvesant Fish and designed by Stanford White of McKim, Mead and White in 1898.

Les Wexner bought this building in 1985 for $13.25 million, to use as office space for Limited, Inc, and sold it for a reported $32 million in 2000.

In 2006, Michael Bloomberg bought the house to be the headquarters of Bloomberg Philanthropies and Willett Advisors.
