= National Park Bank =

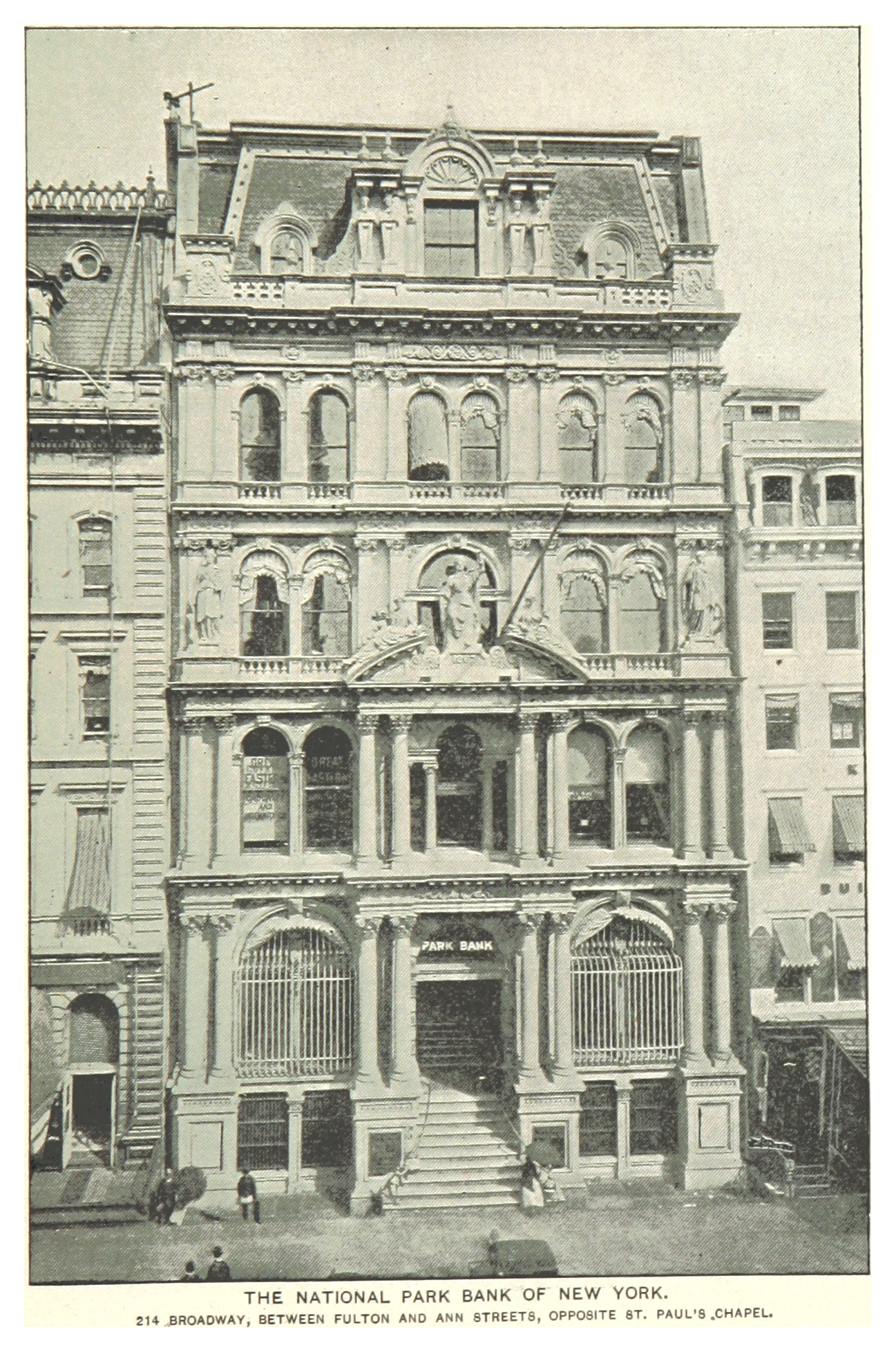
National Park Bank (1868 building)

The National Park Bank was founded in 1856 in New York City, and by the late 19th century, it did more commercial business than any other bank in the country.

== History ==
The bank built a significant Second Empire early skyscraper at 214-18 Broadway – opposite St. Paul's Chapel – designed by New York architect Griffith Thomas and finished in 1868.

=== 1905 building ===
Architect Donn Barber greatly expanded the 1868 building, 1903–1905, altering its Broadway façade beyond recognition. The bank had bought the plot of land directly behind its building, 165 x 75 feet, fronting on Ann Street to the north and Fulton Street to the south. This was intended as the site for a future skyscraper but instead was used for a new banking room with a vault designed by Frederick S. Holmes. Barber designed a T-shaped Beaux-Arts building with a large arched window on each of the three street facades. The bar of the "T" was built first, two tall coffered barrel vaults flanking a stained-glass dome. Banking business moved into this space in 1904, while the lower three stories of the 1868 building (the stem of the "T") were gutted to create a grand entrance hall. The height of the new banking room from the marble floor to the top of the stained-glass dome was 68 feet (20.7 m). Artist Albert Herter painted the large lunette murals of Agriculture, Industry, and Commerce for the entrance hall and banking room.

The building was demolished in 1961.

=== Business ===
In 1911, the bank acquired the Wells Fargo Company.

John Hamilton Fulton was president in 1927.

It was consolidated with Chase National Bank in 1929.

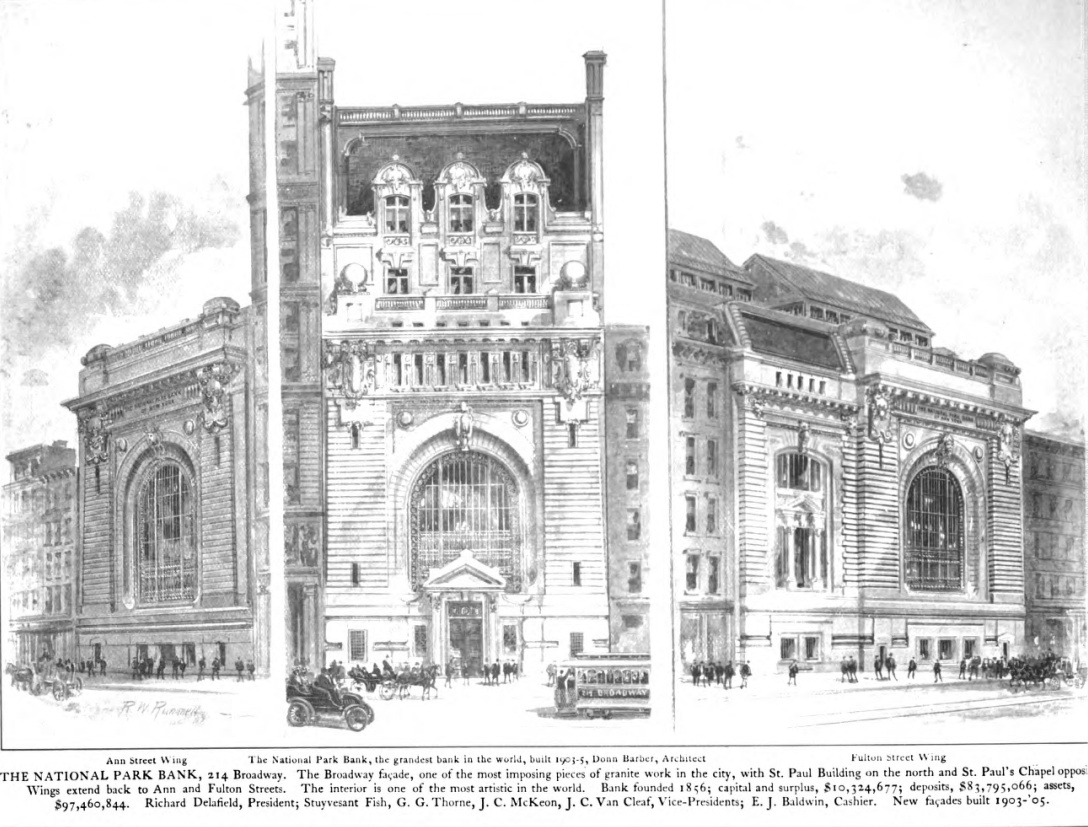
Ann Street façade – Broadway façade – Fulton Street facade

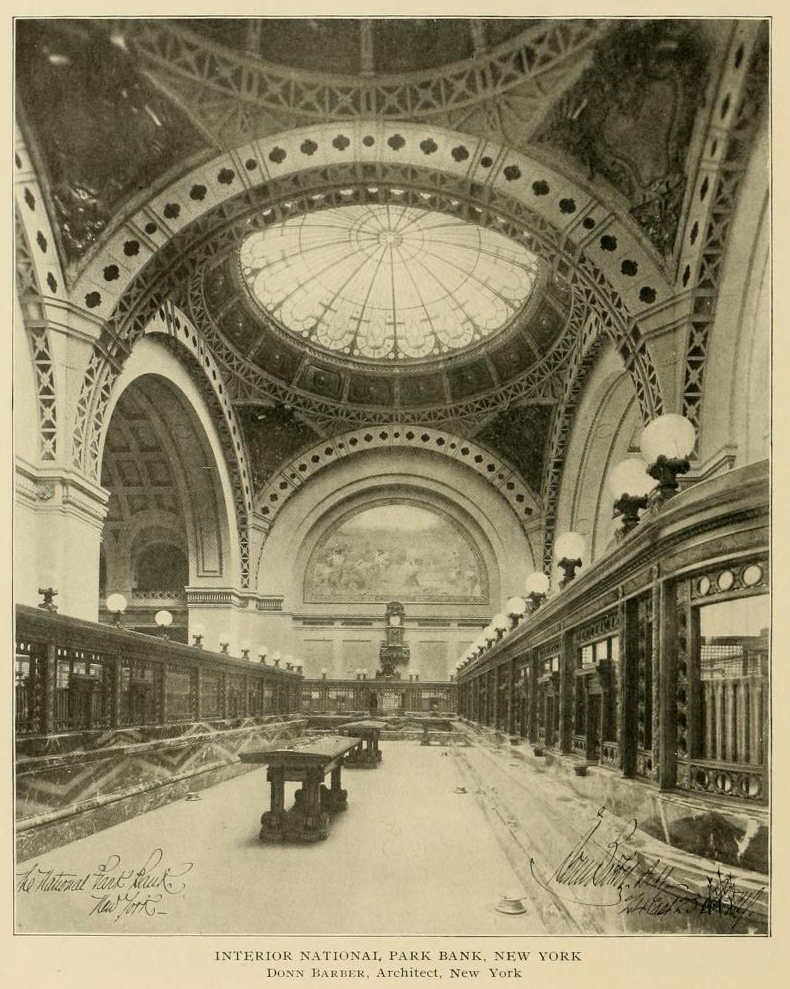
Interior of the 1905 building
