= Aidan Roark =

Irish polo player (1905-1984)

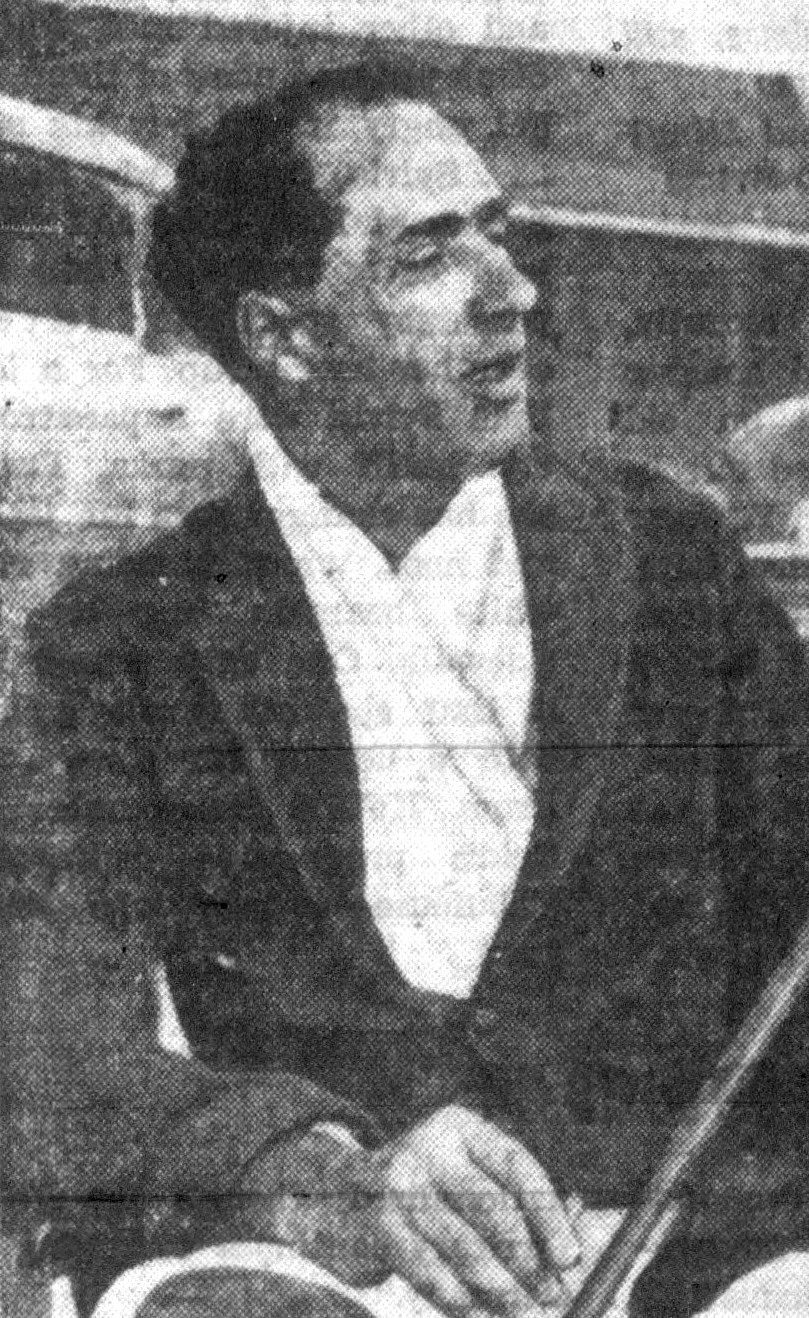
Roark, circa 1950

Aidan Roark (23 October 1905 – 27 March 1984) was an Irish 10-goal polo player. In Hollywood, he acted as a personal assistant to Darryl Francis Zanuck.

== Biography ==
He was born on 23 October 1905, in Carlow, Ireland. He participated in the 1939 International Polo Cup as the second ranked player in Britain. He was married to Esther Foss Moore, the daughter of Eugene Noble Foss. They divorced in 1937.

On 28 October 1939, he married Helen Wills. The couple divorced in the 1970s. They had no children. He died on 27 March 1984, in Watsonville, California, aged 78.

== Acting ==
- Stormy, the Thoroughbred (1954)
