= Fish family =

American political dynasty

- Current region: New York, New Jersey
- Origin: England
- Founder: Jonathan Fish
- Connected families: Stuyvesant family Morris family Kean family Vanderbilt family
- Estate: Hamilton Fish House

The Fish family is a prominent American family who had many members which became influential in politics, diplomacy, and business. The family is of English origin and is descended from Jonathan Fish (1615–1663), who was born in East Farndon, Northamptonshire, England, and ultimately settled in the Province of New York.

== Notable members ==
- Nicholas Fish (1758–1833), soldier, politician.
- Hamilton Fish (1808–1893), politician, U.S. Secretary of State.
- Stuyvesant Fish Morris (1843–1928), medical doctor.
- Nicholas Fish II (1846–1902), the U.S. Chargé d'Affaires to Switzerland from 1877 to 1881, the U.S. minister to Belgium from 1882 to 1885.
- Hamilton Fish II (1849–1936), politician, U.S. Representative from New York.
- Stuyvesant Fish (1851–1923), businessman, president of the Illinois Central Railroad.
- Hamilton Fish III (1888–1991), politician, U.S. Representative from New York.
- Hamilton Fish Armstrong (1893–1973), U.S. diplomat; an editor of Foreign Affairs.
- Hamilton Fish IV (1926–1996), politician, U.S. Representative from New York.
- Nick Fish (1958–2020), politician, Portland City Commissioner.
- Hamilton Fish V (born 1952), publisher of The Nation magazine and The Washington Spectator.

== Family tree ==
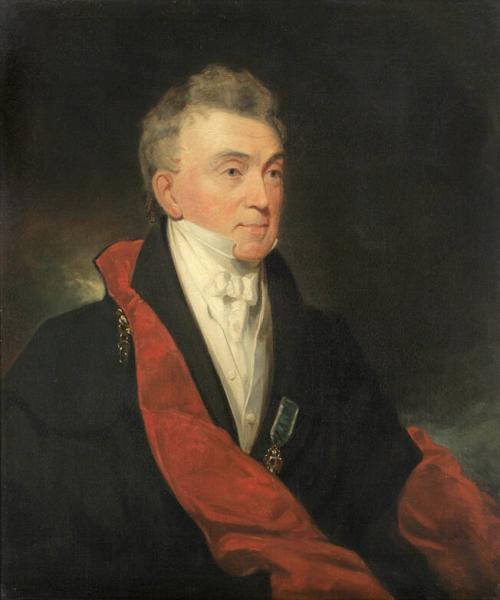
Nicholas Fish: an officer in the American Continental Army, the inaugural Adjutant General of New York and founder of the Fish political dynasty

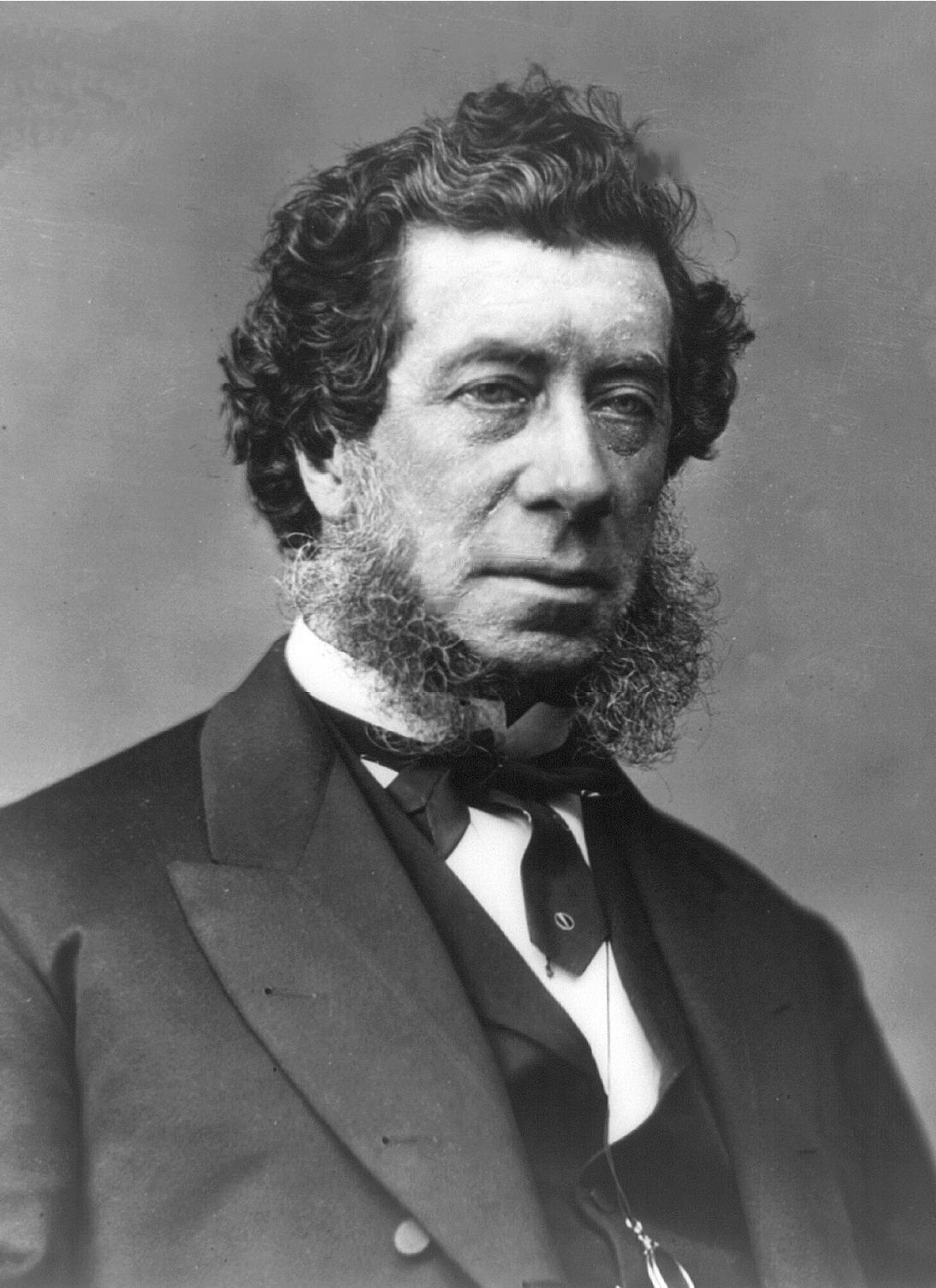
Hamilton Fish: a career statesman who served as Governor of New York, U.S. Senator of New York and U.S. Secretary of State

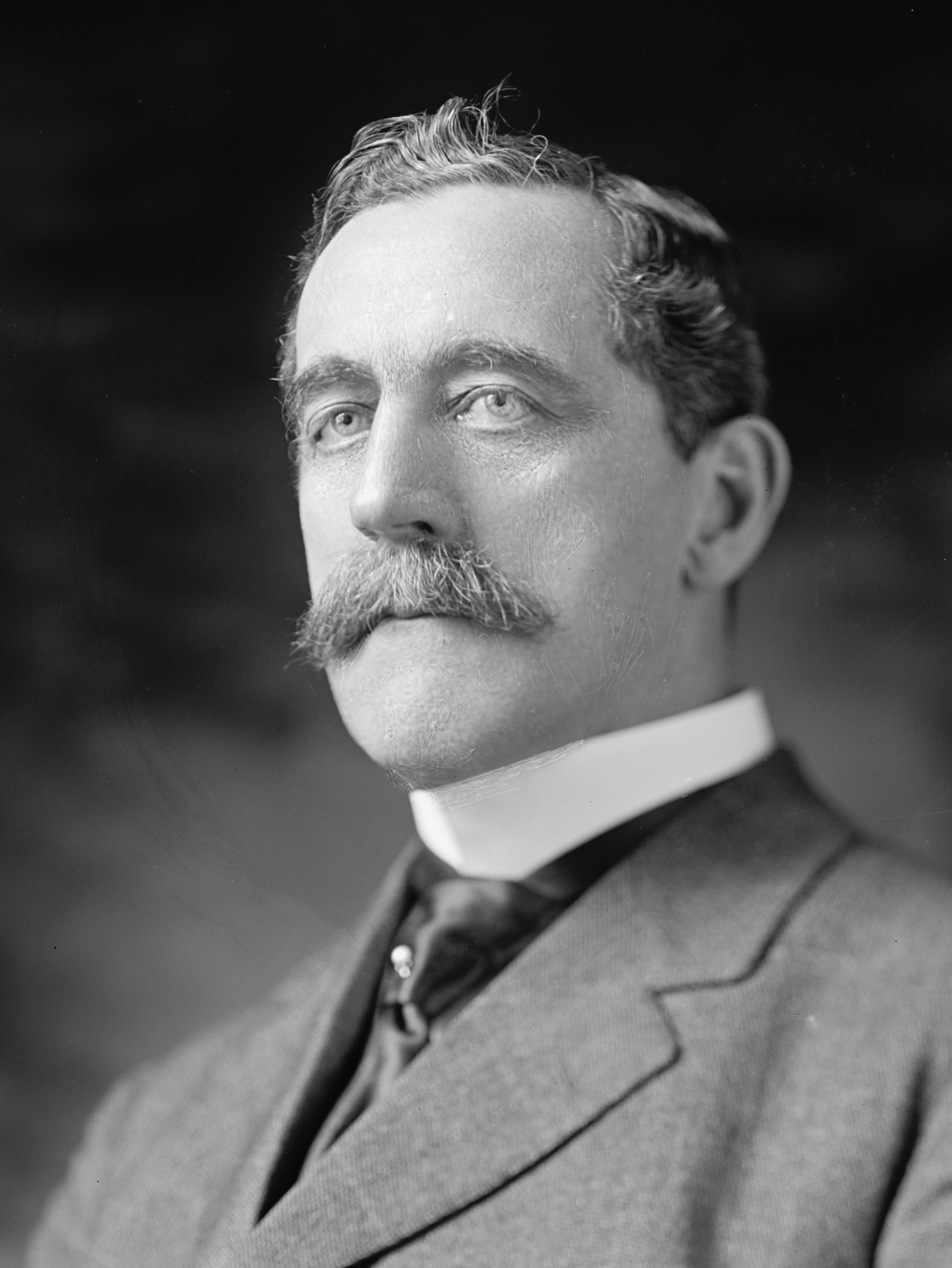
Hamilton Fish II: a Speaker of the New York State Assembly, U.S. Congressman of New York, and Assistant Treasurer of the United States

- Nicholas Fish (1758–1833) ∞ Elizabeth Stuyvesant (1775–1854)
  - Margaret Ann Fish (1807–1877) ∞ John Neilson (1799–1851)
    - Elizabeth Stuyvesant Neilson (1828–1902) ∞ Ezra Williams Howard (1818–1869)
      - Thomas Howard (1862–1904) ∞ Rose Anthony Post (d. 1949)
        - Elizabeth Stuyvesant Howard (1897–1988) ∞ Robert Winthrop Kean (1893–1980).
        - Thomas Howard Howard (b. 1899)
    - Mary Noel Neilson (1830–1908)
    - Nicholas Fish Neilson (1832–1855)
    - Margaret A. Neilson (1835–1905)
    - John Neilson (1838–1903)
    - Helen Neilson (1845–1927) ∞ David Maitland Armstrong (1836–1918)
      - Margaret Neilson Armstrong (1867–1944)
      - Helen Maitland Armstrong (1869–1948)
      - Edward Maitland Armstrong (1874–1915)
      - Marion Howard Armstrong (1880–1957) ∞ Alfred Edey
      - Noel Maitland Armstrong (1882–1938)
      - Bayard Armstrong (1887–1890)
      - Hamilton Fish Armstrong (1893–1973) ∞ (1) 1918: (div. 1938) Helen MacGregor Byrne ∞ (2) 1945: (div. 1951) Carman Barnes (1912–1980) ∞ (3) 1951: Christa von Tippelskirch
        - Helen MacGregor Armstrong (b. 1923) ∞ Edwin Gamble
  - Susan Elizabeth Fish (1808–1892) ∞ Daniel LeRoy (1799–1885)
    - Mary Augusta LeRoy (1829–1905) ∞ Edward King (1816–1875) (brother of George Gordon King)
      - Edward Augustus King (1852–1878)
      - Elizabeth Stuyvesant King (1855–1878)
      - LeRoy King (1857–1895) ∞ Ethel Ledyard Rhinelander (1857–1925)
        - Frederic Rhinelander King (1887–1972) ∞ Edith Percy Morgan (1891–1968)
      - George Gordon King (1859–1922) ∞ Annie Mackenzie Coats (1860–1939)
      - Mary LeRoy King (1862–1904)
      - Edith Edgar King (1864–1942) ∞ Louis Butler McCagg
      - Alexander Mercer King (1870–1885)
    - Elizabeth Stuyvesant LeRoy (1834–1883) ∞ George Warren Dresser (1837–1883)
      - Daniel LeRoy Dresser (1862–1915) ∞ Emma Louise Burnham (b. 1870)
      - Suzanne Leroy Dresser (1864–1960) ∞ Vicomte Romain D'Osmoy
      - Natalie Bayard Dresser (1869–1950) ∞ John Nicholas Brown I (1861–1900)
        - John Nicholas Brown II (1900–1979) ∞ 1930: Anne Seddon Kinsolving (1906–1985)
          - Nicholas Brown (b. 1933) ∞ Diane Verne
          - John Carter Brown III (1934–2002) ∞ (1) Constance Mellon Byers (1942–1983), daughter of Richard King Mellon; ∞ (2) Pamela Braga Drexel
          - Angela Bayard Brown (b. 1938) ∞ Edwin Garvin Fischer (b. 1937), grandson of Edwin Louis Garvin
      - Edith Stuyvesant Dresser (1873–1958) ∞ (1) 1898: George Washington Vanderbilt II (1862–1914); ∞ (2) 1925: Peter Goelet Gerry (1879–1957)
        - Cornelia Stuyvesant Vanderbilt ∞ John Francis Amherst Cecil (1890–1954)
          - George Henry Vanderbilt Cecil (1925–2020)
          - William Amherst Vanderbilt Cecil (1928–2017)
      - Pauline Georgina Dresser (b. 1876) ∞ Rev. George D. Merrill
  - Hamilton Fish (1808–1893) ∞ Julia Ursin Niemcewiez Kean (1816–1887), sister of John Kean and granddaughter of John Kean and Susan Livingston (Susan married Count Julian Ursyn Niemcewicz after Kean's death)
    - Sarah Morris Fish (1838–1925) ∞ Sidney Webster (1828–1910)
      - Hamilton Fish Webster (1861–1939)
    - Julia Kean Fish (1841–1908) ∞ Samuel Nicholl Benjamin (1839–1886)
      - Elizabeth d'Hauteville Benjamin (1871–1884)
      - William Massena Benjamin (1874–1928)
      - Hamilton Fish Benjamin (1877–1938)
      - Julian Arnold Benjamin (1877–1953)
    - Susan LeRoy Fish (1844–1909) ∞ William Evans Rogers (1846–1913)
    - Nicholas Fish II (1846–1902) ∞ 1869: Clemence Smith Bryce (1847–1908), sister of Lloyd Bryce
      - Hamilton Fish II (1873–1898)
    - Hamilton Fish II (1849–1936) ∞ (1) Emily Maria Mann (1854–1899); ∞ (2) Florence Delaplaine Amsinck (1849–1926)
      - Janet Fish (1883–1970)
      - Julia Kean Fish (1884–1960) ∞ William Lawrence Breese (1883–1915)
        - Hamilton Fish Breese (1910–1920)
      - Emily Rosalind Fish (1886–1975) ∞ John Wilson Cutler (1887–1950)
      - Hamilton Fish III (1888–1991) ∞ Grace Chapin Rogers (1885–1960), daughter of Alfred Clark Chapin; ∞ Marie Choubaroff (1905–1974); ∞ (4) 1988: Lydia Ambrogio (1932–2015)
        - Lillian Veronica Fish ∞ David Whitmire Hearst (1915–1986), son of William Randolph Hearst
        - Elizabeth Fish (1922–2015) ∞ Venkatesan Perry (1932–2016)
        - Hamilton Fish IV (1926–1996) ∞ (1) 1951: Julia MacKenzie (1927–1969); ∞ (2) 1971: Billy Laster Cline (1924–1985); ∞ (3) 1989: Mary Ann Tinklepaugh Knauss (b. 1930)
          - Hamilton Fish V (b. 1952) ∞ Sandra Harper
          - Julia Alexandra Fish (b. 1953) ∞ Thomas Ward
          - Nicholas Stuyvesant Fish (1958–2020)
          - Peter Livingston Fish (b. 1959)
      - Helena Livingston Fish (1893–1970) ∞ Henry Forster (1889–1989)
        - Henry H. Forster (1921–2000)
        - Bayard Stuyvesant Forster (1924–2001) ∞ Clare Chanler (1927–1992), granddaughter of Lewis Stuyvesant Chanler
        - Sheila Emily Forster (1928–2011) ∞ J. Anthony G. Morris
    - Stuyvesant Fish (1851–1923) ∞ 1876: Marion Graves Anthon (1853–1915)
      - Livingston Fish (1879–1880)
      - Marian Anthon Fish (1880–1944) ∞ 1907: (div. 1934) Albert Zabriskie Gray (1881–1964), son of John Clinton Gray
      - Stuyvesant Fish, Jr. (1883–1952) ∞ Isabelle Mildred Dick (1884–1972)
        - Peter Stuyvesant Fish (1911–1993) ∞ Florence Whistler Voorhees (1913–2001)
          - Janet Fish (1938–2025) ∞ Charles Parness (1945–present)
      - Sidney Webster Fish (1885–1950) ∞ (1) 1915: Olga Martha Wiborg (1890–1937), daughter of Frank Bestow Wiborg; ∞ (2) 1929: Esther Foss, daughter of Eugene Noble Foss
    - Edith Livingston Fish (1856–1887) ∞ 1883 Hon. Oliver Northcote (1854–1900), young son of Stafford Northcote, 1st Earl of Iddesleigh
  - Elizabeth Sarah Fish (1810–1881) ∞ Richard Lewis Morris (1816–1880)
    - Stuyvesant Fish Morris (1843–1928) ∞ Ellen James Van Buren (1844–1929), granddaughter of Martin Van Buren
      - Elizabeth Marshall Morris (1869–1919) ∞ B. Woolsey Rogers
      - Ellen Van Buren Morris (1873–1954) ∞ Francis Livingston Pell (1873–1945)
      - Richard Lewis Morris III (b. 1875) ∞ Carolyn Whitney Fellowes (b. 1882)
      - Stuyvesant Fish Morris, Jr. (1877–1925)

=== Kean family ===
The Fish family is related to the Kean family through Hamilton Fish's wife, Julia Ursin Niemcewiez Kean.

Notable members

- Hamilton Fish Kean (1862–1941), New Jersey Republican Committeeman 1905–1919, delegate to the Republican National Convention 1916, Republican National Committeeman 1919–1928, candidate for U.S. Senate from New Jersey 1924, U.S. Senator from New Jersey 1929–1935.
- Robert W. Kean (1893–1980), delegate to the Republican National Convention 1936, U.S. Representative from New Jersey 1939–1959, candidate for U.S. Senate from New Jersey 1958.
- Thomas Kean (born 1935), New Jersey Assemblyman 1968–1977, Governor of New Jersey 1982–1990.
- Thomas Kean Jr. (born 1968), New Jersey state senator 2003-2022 and U.S. Representative from 2023.

Family tree

- John Kean (1814–1895) m. Lucinetta "Lucy" Halsted (1825–1912), daughter of Caleb O. Halsted
  - Hamilton Fish Kean (1862–1941) m. Katharine Taylor Winthrop (1866–1943), daughter Robert Winthrop
    - Robert W. Kean (1893–1980) m. Elizabeth Stuyvesant Howard
      - Thomas Kean (b. 1935) m. Deborah Bye
        - Thomas Kean, Jr. (b. 1968) m. Rhonda Lee Norton

NOTE: Hamilton Fish Kean was also great-grandson of Continental Congressional Delegate John Kean and brother of U.S. Senator John Kean.
