= Girls Preparatory School =

School in Chattanooga, Tennessee, US

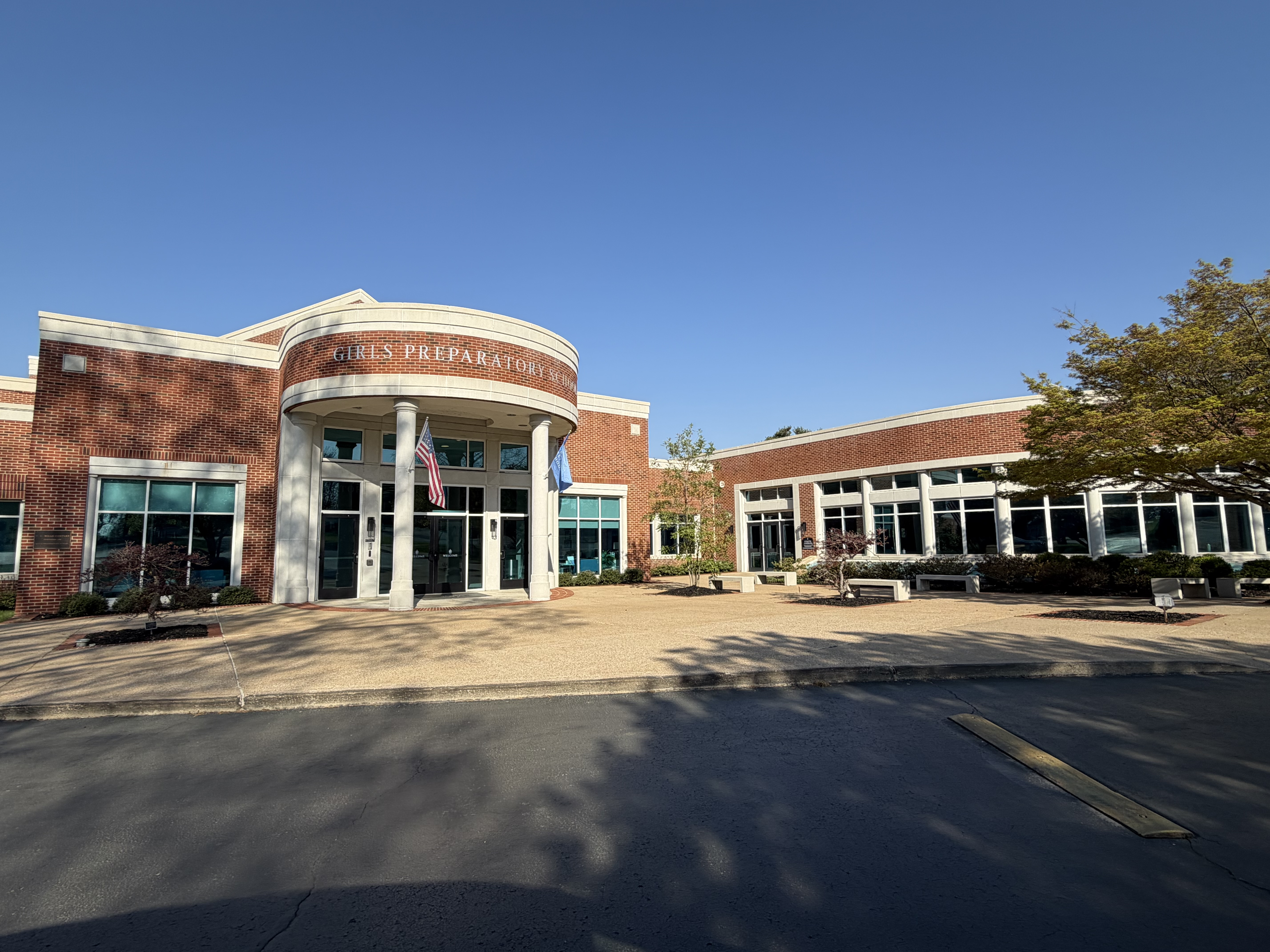
- The main building of GPS in 2026

Location
- 205 Island Ave. Chattanooga, Tennessee 37405; United States; 35.0613°N 85.2989°W

Information
- Type: Independent, Single-sex, secondary, day school
- Motto: Designed for Her
- Established: 1906
- Founders: Tommie Payne Duffy, Eula Lee Jarnagin, and Grace McCallie
- Sister school: The McCallie School
- Headmaster: Megan D. Cover
- 6–12: 6–12
- Gender: Female
- Enrollment: 500 (2025-26 academic year)
- Houses: Founders House
- Student Union/Association: The C. Ben Harnsberger Student Center
- Colors: Blue , Black , and White
- Athletics: 16 varsity sports; 12 no-cut middle school sports
- Mascot: Bruisers
- Nickname: The Bruisers
- Rivals: Baylor School, Harpeth Hall School
- Publication: The Girls Preparatory School magazine, published biannually
- Yearbook: Kaleidoscope
- Website: www.gps.edu

Girls Preparatory School, or GPS, is an all-female college preparatory school in Chattanooga, Tennessee, United States. It was founded in 1906 by Grace Eliza McCallie, Tommie Payne Duffy, and Eula Lea Jarnagin. GPS enrolls students in grades 6–12. These students are taught by GPS's faculty members, over 69% of whom hold advanced degrees. A trailblazer for girls' athletics in Chattanooga, GPS fielded the first girls team in basketball (1909), the first girls' golf team in Tennessee (1974), the first girls' rowing team in Chattanooga (1994), the first girls' lacrosse team in Chattanooga (2005), and the first girls' squash team in Tennessee (2022). GPS is also home to Terpsichord, one of the longest-running modern dance companies in the U.S. For the 2025–26 school year, GPS enrolled 500 girls from 84 zip codes, with 210 in Middle School and 290 in Upper School.

Its brother school, The McCallie School, was founded a year earlier by Grace McCallie's brothers. As of July 1, 2021, GPS's Head of School is Megan D. Cover.

== History ==
=== Origins ===
In 1905, Duffy and Jarnagin, two public school teachers, asked the city school board to provide a fourth year of high school studies, including modern language and a lab science, so that girls, as well as boys, would apply for college. When their request was denied, they decided to create an independent school to prepare girls for higher education and convinced their friend and fellow teacher Grace McCallie to join them.

In 12 weeks, they converted McCallie's former home into a school. The three founders pooled all of their money, $300, to equip and launch the school. The school opened on September 12, 1906, in a four-room schoolhouse at 106 Oak Street. The ground floor contained classrooms with second-hand desks. There was also an alcove library and cloakroom.

The school welcomed 45 enrolled students on the first day of classes on September 12, 1906. Each girl paid $80 tuition per year, and at the end of the first year, one of the students was accepted to and enrolled in Randolph-Macon Woman's College, and another enrolled in Western, an Ohio college for women. In 1915, the school relocated to a larger brick building at 611 Palmetto Street. In 1947, GPS again moved, this time to its current home on Island Avenue, with 14 classrooms, a study hall, library and dining hall. Since the move, the campus has been significantly added on to and revitalized, with the addition of a separate middle school and high school, a 700-seat theater, and a new student center, among other facilities.

Girls Preparatory School celebrated its 100th anniversary during the 2005–06 school year. In 2025-26, the school celebrated its 120th year.

== Academics ==
GPS offers a middle school curriculum for grades 6–8, and an upper school curriculum for grades 9–12.

The upper school offers 24 Advanced Placement courses, ranging from AP Biology to AP Comparative Government and Politics, as well as various STEM course offerings.

In 2024, the middle school became the first all-girls school and the first school in Tennessee to be designated as an AMLE School of Distinction.

== Athletics ==
GPS competes in the Tennessee Secondary School Athletic Association (TSSAA), and its varsity sports are:

- Basketball
- Bowling
- Cheerleading
- Climbing
- Cross Country
- Diving
- Golf
- Lacrosse
- Rowing
- Soccer
- Softball
- Squash
- Swimming
- Tennis
- Track and Field
- Volleyball

== Programs ==
=== Cadek Conservatory of Music ===
The Cadek Conservatory of Music was founded in Chattanooga in 1904 by Joseph Ottokar Cadek, a Prague-born violinist. It became affiliated with the University of Chattanooga in 1935. In 2017, the Conservatory formed a new partnership with Girls Preparatory School, and relocated from Cadek Hall, on UTC's campus, to GPS's campus. Cadek Conservatory offered musical instruction for students of any ages in private, group, and ensemble settings. In 2025, the school chose to close the conservatory.

=== Partnerships in the Community (PIC) ===
A broad spectrum of community organizations and components of local governments are part of PIC including the Chattanooga Area Food Bank and Girls Inc. of Chattanooga.

=== Tucker Fellows ===
At the retirement of former longtime headmaster Randy Tucker, the GPS Board of Trustees and friends of the school joined to honor his tenure with the establishment of the Tucker Fellows Program, a two-year student study of the Tennessee River. The mission of the program, which began in the summer before the 2014–15 school year, is to prepare future leaders to have an effect on the conservation of the Tennessee River. Fellows, selected prior to their freshman year, spend part of the summer and following academic year engaged in interdisciplinary scholarship and experiential learning about the many issues impacting their local watershed as well as learning about the historical, ecological, political, economic and aesthetic significance of the Tennessee River.

During the second year in the program, fellows focus on leadership skills while continuing to learn about the river and watershed. They read and discuss the works of current and historic environmental thinkers. They choose a focus and work with local experts, scientific literature, and policy to become more knowledgeable about their chosen topic. They then collect, analyze, and publish data. Throughout the program, fellows become familiar with the various entities that implement, enforce, and monitor watershed policy. By the end of the program, fellows propose solutions to watershed problems and become lifelong advocates for clean, healthy watersheds in the Chattanooga area and beyond.

Currently the program focuses on the local region through experiential, place-based learning and student-driven projects. Designed to inspire changemakers through a focus on community, innovation, and meaningful impact, this year-long, Honors-level course engages girls in exploring Chattanooga, building research skills (including training in AI tools), and creating solutions to local challenges.

== Traditions ==
GPS upholds many traditions that are celebrated throughout the school year, with many including community service opportunities.

=== May Day ===
While most traditions are school-wide, some focus on certain grades. One such tradition is May Day, a pageant that combines the old traditions of a May Day from the Renaissance and a debutante pageant. The senior class is presented in colorful dresses, one by one, with a May Court and May Queen introduced separately; the May Queen is the last presented. The May Queen and Court are nominated by the senior class and then chosen by the student body and faculty based upon service to school and others and embodiment of a true GPS girl. After the class is introduced, festivities are held on the school's Smith Courtyard, and seniors, guests, and the student body watch as different grades dance to music chosen to match that year's theme. All dances are usually done barefoot. The last dance is the May Pole ceremony, in which sophomores wrap three traditional maypoles for the Queen to walk under, ending the ceremony.

=== Senior Chapel Talks ===
Another tradition is that of senior Chapel Talks. Each senior gives a three- to seven-minute talk about a subject of her choosing to her peers and invited guests during a schoolwide assembly, also called Chapel, which occurs several times a week.

=== Cat-Rat ===
Another highly celebrated tradition is that of Cat-Rat, a pairing of a senior with a new sixth-grader. In this tradition the senior Cat acts as a mentor and friend to the sixth-grader, her Rat. Cats decorate their Rats’ lockers prior to the start of school, and the revealing of the newly decorated locker is a key part of the Cat-Rat Reveal (which also takes place just before the start of school). In addition, during the Cat-Rat Reveal, the sixth grade Rats take part in a random drawing which determines the order of their Cats’ Chapel Talks. Several parties, activities, and celebrations help the girls get to know each other better and allow the senior girl to guide the younger student through her school year. The long-standing tradition has been known to bond students as friends and even business partners well into adulthood.

=== Robin Hood ===
Formerly, a weeklong festival was planned each year by an elected committee of students, known as Robin Hood. In the festival, any school-recognized club or team is able to open a booth and sell a craft or food for a charity of their choice. The committee itself could also operate a booth, which would benefit the overall goal of that year's Robin Hood. In the past, the main goal has been to gift Greg Mortenson, author of Three Cups of Tea: One Man's Mission To Promote Peace... One School At A Time and the founder of Central Asia Institute, with the money to endow a girls' school in Pakistan. Another year it was to help assist a like-minded Chattanooga school with a contribution to Chattanooga Girl's Leadership Academy, an all girls college preparatory charter school focusing on STEM education, the first public single-gender school in Tennessee. This long-standing tradition, however, was phased out by 2014.

=== MBD: Girl Edition ===
One of GPS's newer traditions, MBD: Girl Edition, is an entrepreneurial opportunity for girls in and around the Chattanooga area to seek knowledge and support from local professionals. It debuted in 2015 as a women's and girls' symposium, Mad Bad and Dangerous, and has hosted such notable guest speakers as Lori Greiner, prolific inventor and "Shark Tank" star. The most recent installment featured a one-day Girls Marketplace, where girls sold products and services, and a 24Hour Generator, which paired students with mentors to help them solve real-world business problems as they competed for a cash prize. The event relied heavily on volunteers and financial support of businesses and community organizations. The event was discontinued in 2020.

=== Rivalry Week ===
One week out of every fall semester is reserved for celebrating the friendship between GPS and McCallie and the schools' rivalry with Baylor. The week begins on Monday and includes many activities, both coordinate with McCallie and within GPS, including a car drop, a bonfire, and several pep rallies. The week concludes with the Friday night annual McCallie-Baylor football game, attended by students, alumni, and their families, and has been widely televised. Rivalry Week began when Baylor was an all-male school, and members of McCallie and Baylor would visit the GPS campus to "win favor" with the GPS students. For example, a McCallie student might leave a blue ribbon on one girl's locker, while a Baylor student could leave a red rose. This contest aimed to have the most GPS students in one school's stands at the McCallie-Baylor football game. When Baylor became co-ed in the 1980s, GPS and Baylor began a rivalry of their own, partnering with McCallie to win the most athletic events against Baylor over the course of the week. Most varsity athletic teams scrimmage or play against Baylor during Rivalry Week, including the Crew team, the Soccer team, and the Lacrosse team. One unofficial custom that many students participate in is attaching a McCallie flag (usually a white sheet with an M spray painted on), to the back of one's vehicle, then driving around the city, especially near Baylor or the other schools. Baylor students may then chase these vehicles, often with knives and paintball guns, aiming to stop the car flying the flag and either steal or mutilate the flag. This can lead to high-speed chases and other dangerous behaviors, and students are strongly encouraged by the administrations of all three schools to avoid any and all such illegal activities related to Rivalry Week. Rivalry Week is one of the most beloved coordinate programs enjoyed by GPS students.

=== Other ===
The onsite garden is maintained and cultivated by the environmental science class, a junior and senior science elective. The crops grown in the garden are chosen and raised by the students, harvested, and taken to the Chattanooga Area Food Bank, or included in the school's lunch menu.

There are many other traditions as well, such as a long-standing partnership with Habitat for Humanity, and leadership summer camps.

== Notable alumnae and faculty ==
=== Alumnae ===
- Carman Barnes, writer
- Rachel Boston, actress
- Laurel H. Carney, Marylou Ingram Professor of Biomedical Engineering at University of Rochester
- R. Marie Griffith, John C. Danforth Distinguished Professor at Washington University in St. Louis, and author
- Mary Alice Haney, designer and podcast host
- Teresa Phillips, First female NCAA Division 1 Men's Basketball coach
- Andrea Saul, Republican Party operative
- Tracy Seretean, Academy Award-winning filmmaker
- Dr. Chris Benz Smith, inaugural Dean of the School of Nursing at the University of Tennessee at Chattanooga
- Lisa Hendy, first female chief ranger at Great Smoky Mountains National Park and recipient of the Harry Yount Award of the National Park Service
- Mai Belle Hurley, first female member of the Chattanooga City Council
- Judge Marie Williams, first woman appointed judge of the Eleventh Circuit Court of Tennessee

=== Headmasters ===
- 1906–18: Grace Eliza McCallie
- 1906–45: Tommie Payne Duffy
- 1906–45: Eula Lea Jarnagin
- 1947–50: Edith M. Lewis
- 1950–66: Mary Hannah Tucker
- 1966–73: Dr. Paul G. Bode
- 1973–87: Dr. Nathaniel C. Hughes Jr.
- 1987–2013: Stanley R. Tucker Jr.
- 2013–14: Sue Groesbeck (Interim)
- 2014–20: Dr. Autumn A. Graves
- 2020–21: Dr. R. Kirk Walker (Interim)
- 2021–present: Megan Cover
