= Kyle Phillips (American football) =

American football player (born 1997)

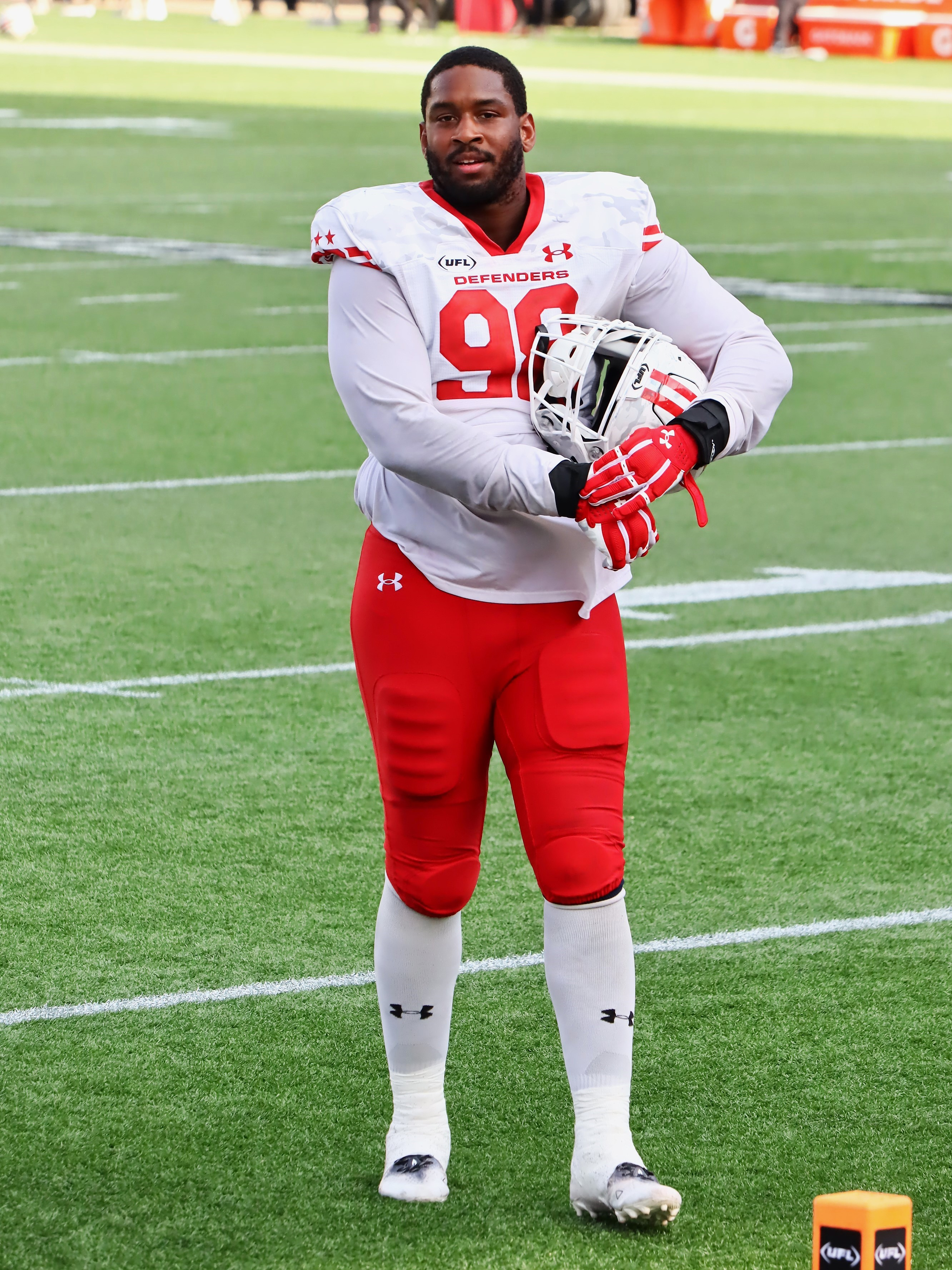
- Phillips with the DC Defenders in 2025

Profile
- Position: Defensive end

Personal information
- Born: May 5, 1997 (age 29); Nashville, Tennessee, U.S.
- Listed height: 6 ft 4 in (1.93 m)
- Listed weight: 277 lb (126 kg)

Career information
- High school: Hillsboro (Nashville, Tennessee)
- College: Tennessee
- NFL draft: 2019: undrafted

Career history
- New York Jets (2019–2021); New Orleans Saints (2023); Birmingham Stallions (2025)*; DC Defenders (2025)
- * Offseason or practice squad member only

Awards and highlights
- UFL champion (2025)

Career NFL statistics as of 2023
- Total tackles: 68
- Sacks: 2.5
- Pass deflections: 1
- Stats at Pro Football Reference

Kyle Phillips (born May 5, 1997) is an American professional football defensive end. He played college football with the Tennessee Volunteers, and has previously played in the National Football League (NFL) for the New York Jets.

== Early life ==
Phillips grew up in Nashville, Tennessee, and attended Hillsboro High School. As a senior, he made 58 tackles (22.5 for loss) with 13 sacks and was named All-Midstate as well as one of The Tennessean's "Dandy Dozen". Phillips was rated a four star recruit and played in the 2015 All-American Bowl, where he committed to play college football at the University of Tennessee over offers from LSU and Ole Miss.

== College career ==
Phillips played four seasons for the Tennessee Volunteers, serving primarily as a reserve defensive lineman until midway through his junior year. He recorded 35 tackles (4.5 for loss) with two sacks and two passes defended in his junior season. As a senior, Phillips made 56 tackles, eight for a loss, and five sacks. On October 20, 2018, against Alabama, he recorded a 27-yard pick-six. He finished his collegiate career with 114 tackles, 16 for a loss, eight sacks, and nine passes defended in 41 games played.

== Professional career ==
Pre-draft measurables
Height	Weight	Arm length	Hand span	Wingspan	40-yard dash	10-yard split	20-yard split	20-yard shuttle	Three-cone drill	Vertical jump	Broad jump	Bench press
6 ft 3 3/4 in (1.92 m)	277 lb (126 kg)	33 1/2 in (0.85 m)	9 3/4 in (0.25 m)	6 ft 8 3/4 in (2.05 m)	4.68 s	1.65 s	2.72 s	4.77 s	7.44 s	32.5 in (0.83 m)	9 ft 7 in (2.92 m)	17 reps
All values from Pro Day

=== New York Jets ===
Phillips signed with the New York Jets as an undrafted free agent on April 27, 2019, and made the 53-man roster out of training camp. He made his NFL debut on September 16, 2019, against the Cleveland Browns, making two tackles. Phillips finished his rookie season with 39 tackles, nine tackles for loss and 1.5 sacks with a pass defended in 15 games played, four of which he started.

Phillips suffered a season-ending ankle injury on October 25, 2020, in an 18–10 loss to the Buffalo Bills and was placed on injured reserve on October 28. He played in seven games with three starts in the 2020 season, recording 11 tackles, three of which were for loss.

On August 31, 2021, Phillips was placed on the reserve/physically unable to perform list to start the season. He was activated on November 17. He appeared in seven games and made one start in the 2021 season. He recorded one sack, which came in Week 14 against the New Orleans Saints.

=== New Orleans Saints ===
On July 31, 2023, Phillips signed with the New Orleans Saints. He was waived on August 29, 2023, and re-signed to the practice squad. On September 13, 2023, the Saints signed Phillips to the active roster. He appeared in five games in the 2023 season.

=== Birmingham Stallions ===
On December 6, 2024, Phillips signed with the Birmingham Stallions of the United Football League (UFL).

=== DC Defenders ===
On March 20, 2025, Phillips was claimed by the DC Defenders of the United Football League (UFL).

== Personal life ==
Phillips mother, Teresa Phillips, served as the athletic director of Tennessee State University from 2002 to 2019.
