= Peter Philip James Kean =

American aristocrat (1788–1828)

- Born: February 27, 1788; Elizabethtown, New Jersey, US
- Died: October 2, 1828 (aged 40); New Lebanon, New York, US
- Education: Princeton University
- Spouse: Sarah Sabina Morris (m. 1813)
- Children: 8
- Parent(s): John Kean; Susan Livingston Kean
- Relatives: John Kean (grandson); Hamilton Fish Kean (grandson); Nicholas Fish II (grandson); Hamilton Fish II (grandson); Stuyvesant Fish (grandson); Peter Livingston (grandfather); Count Julian Niemcewicz (step-father)

Peter Philip James Kean (February 27, 1788 – October 2, 1828) was an American soldier and member of the Kean political family.

== Early life ==
Kean was born in Elizabethtown, New Jersey, on February 27, 1788. He was the only child born of John Kean, the cashier of the Bank of the United States and a Continental Congressmen, and Susan (née Livingston) Kean (1759–1853). After his father's early death in 1795, his mother hired Count Julian Niemcewicz as his tutor. Niemcewicz, a Polish nobleman who fled Poland after fighting unsuccessfully for Polish independence, later married Kean's mother in 1800.

His paternal grandmother was Jane Grove and his step-grandfather was Captain Samuel Grove, a wealthy and successful merchant from Beaufort County, South Carolina. His maternal grandparents were Peter Van Brugh Livingston, the New York State Treasurer, and Mary (née Alexander) Livingston. He was also the great-grandson of Philip Livingston, the 2nd Lord of Livingston Manor, and the great-nephew of New Jersey's governor William Livingston, a signer of the U.S. Declaration of Independence and the U.S. Constitution.

== Career ==
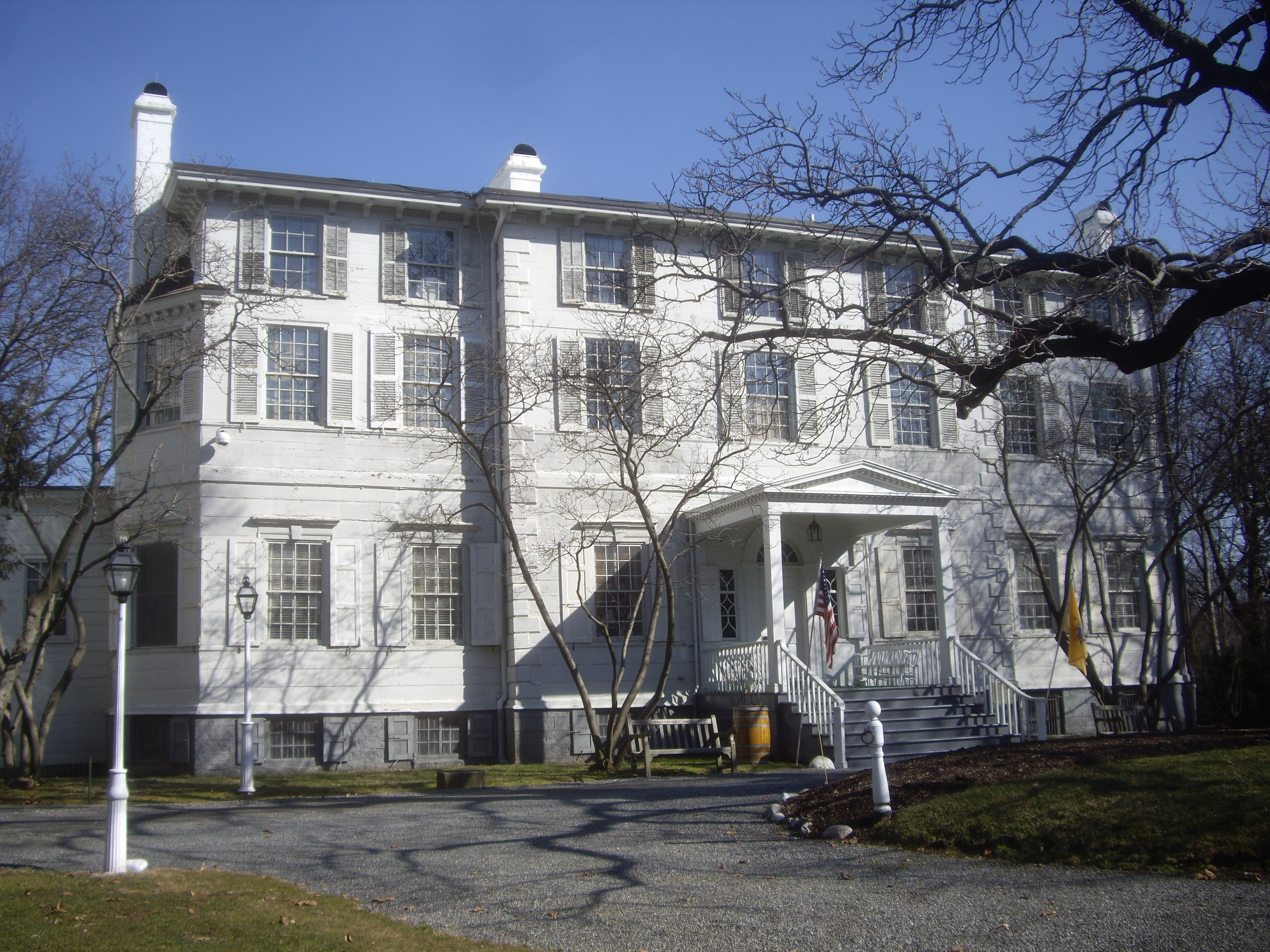
Liberty Hall, the Kean family mansion purchased by Peter in 1811 for his mother, built by his great-uncle William Livingston in 1772.

Kean graduated from Princeton University in 1807. After his graduation, Kean assumed a prominent role in the military affairs of the State of New Jersey. In 1811, Kean purchased the large estate built by his mother's uncle, known as Liberty Hall, in trust for his mother.

In 1824, when the Marquis de Lafayette returned to the United States for his grand tour, Isaac Halstead Williamson, the 8th New Jersey Governor, appointed Kean to the reception committee to welcome him due to Kean's prominence and fluency in French.

At the time of his death, Kean was colonel of the Fourth Regiment of the State of New Jersey.

== Personal life ==
On February 18, 1813, Kean was married to Sarah Sabina Morris (1788–1878), the daughter of General Jacob Morris and Mary (née Cox) Morris. Sarah was a granddaughter of Lewis Morris, a signor of the Declaration of Independence. Together, they were the parents of:

- John Kean (1814–1895), who married Lucinetta "Lucy" Halsted (1825–1912), daughter of Caleb O. Halsted, Esq., a merchant, and had ten children.
- Jacob Morris Kean (1815–1817), who died young.
- Julia Ursin Niemcewiez Kean (1816–1887), who married Hamilton Fish (1808–1893), a descendant of Peter Stuyvesant, in 1836 and had eight children. Fish served as Governor of New York, U.S. Senator, and U.S. Secretary of State.
- Sarah Louisa Jay Kean (1818–1828), who died young.
- Susan Mary Kean (1821–1824), who died young.
- Helen Rutherfurd Kean (1822–1824), who died young.
- Christine Alexander William Kean (1826–1915), who married William Preston Griffin (1810–1851), a cousin of William Radford.
- Cornelia Livingston Kean (1829–1829), who died young.

Kean died on October 2, 1828, in New Lebanon, New York.

=== Descendants ===
Through his daughter Julia, he was the grandfather of Julia Kean Fish (1841–1908), who married Samuel Nicholl Benjamin (1839–1886), a Union Army officer; Nicholas Fish II (1848–1902), who served as U.S. Ambassador to Switzerland and Belgium; Hamilton Fish II (1849–1936), a U.S. Representative and Speaker of the New York State Assembly; and Stuyvesant Fish (1851–1923), a president of the Illinois Central Railroad who married Marion Graves Anthon (1853–1915), a leader of New York Society during the Gilded Age.

Through his son John, he was the grandfather of John Kean (1852–1914) and Hamilton Fish Kean (1862–1941), both of whom would later serve as U.S. Senators for New Jersey.
