= Laurel H. Carney =

American engineer and scientist

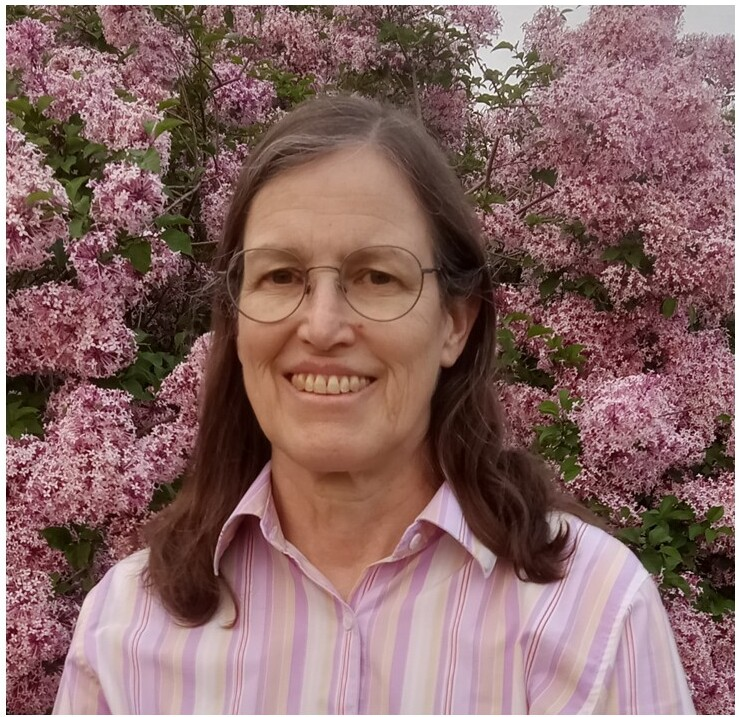
- Born: 19 September 1961
- Citizenship: United States
- Education: Massachusetts Institute of Technology; University of Wisconsin
- Known for: Empirical and computational investigations of the auditory system
- Scientific career
- Fields: Engineering; Neuroscience
- Workplaces: Boston University; Syracuse University; University of Rochester

Laurel H. Carney (born 19 September, 1961) is an American engineer and neuroscientist who conducts research on the auditory system. She is the Marylou Ingram Professor in Biomedical Engineering, and Professor of Neurobiology & Anatomy, at the University of Rochester.

== Life and career ==
Carney's secondary education was at the Girls Preparatory School in Chattanooga, Tennessee. She received a S.B. in electrical engineering at MIT in 1983, and M.S. (1985) and Ph.D. (1989) degrees in electrical engineering at the University of Wisconsin. Her postdoctoral training was performed at the University of Pennsylvania. Following faculty appointments at Boston University and Syracuse University, in 2007 she assumed a faculty position at University of Rochester, where she is currently the Marylou Ingram Professor in Biomedical Engineering and Professor of Neurobiology & Anatomy.

Carney's research combines neurophysiological, behavioral, and computational modeling techniques towards understanding neural mechanisms underlying the perception of complex sounds, and applying that information to the design of physiologically based signal-processing strategies to aid listeners with hearing loss. Since 1995 Carney has been a licensed professional engineer in the field of electrical engineering. As of 2025 Carney has produced 119 research papers, and her research on the auditory system has been funded by the US National Institutes of Health continuously since 1992. She has been a member of the National Institute on Deafness and Other Communication Disorders Advisory Council.

In 2024 Carney was hosted by the Eriksholm Research Centre in Snekkersten, Denmark, the research facility of the Danish hearing aid company Oticon. She has been a Fellow and workshop co-organizer at the Hanse-Wissenschaftskolleg in Delmenhorst, Germany.

== Awards ==
- Fellow, Acoustical Society of America (2002). For contributions to an integrated understanding of the physiology and psychophysics of hearing.
- Fellow, American Institute for Medical and Biological Engineering (2006). For contributions to the mathematical modeling and empirical characterization of the mammalian auditory system.
- William and Christine Hartmann Prize in Auditory Neuroscience, Acoustical Society of America (2015). For research that links auditory physiology with auditory perception or behavior.
- Marylou Ingram Professor, University of Rochester (2016).
- Professor of the Year Award, University of Rochester (2016).

== Selected reviews ==
Carney LH. (2024) Neural Fluctuation Contrast as a Code for Complex Sounds: The Role and Control of Peripheral Nonlinearities. Hear Res. 443:108966.

Carney LH. (2018) Supra-Threshold Hearing and Fluctuation Profiles: Implications for Sensorineural and Hidden Hearing Loss. J Assoc Res Otolaryngol. 19(4):331-352.

== See also ==
- Auditory science
