= Gardner School for Girls =

Information
- Established: 1860
- Gender: Girls

The Gardner School for Girls was an American private school for girls that operated in New York City, New York, in the 19th and 20th centuries.

== History ==
The school was established in 1860 by a Baptist minister. The school was headed for many years by Mrs. Charles H. Gardner.

For several decades it was located at 607 Fifth Avenue, between 48th and 49th Streets. Later, from 1916 to 1933 the school was located at 11 East 51st Street in the former home of John Peirce, between Madison and Fifth Avenues.

== Notable students ==
Among the women who attended the Gardner School were the following:

- Carman Barnes – writer
- Patricia Ellis – actress
- Mary Hatcher – actress and singer
- Blanche Knopf – publisher
- Mary Craig Sinclair – writer
