= Hamilton Fish Armstrong =

American journalist (1893–1973)

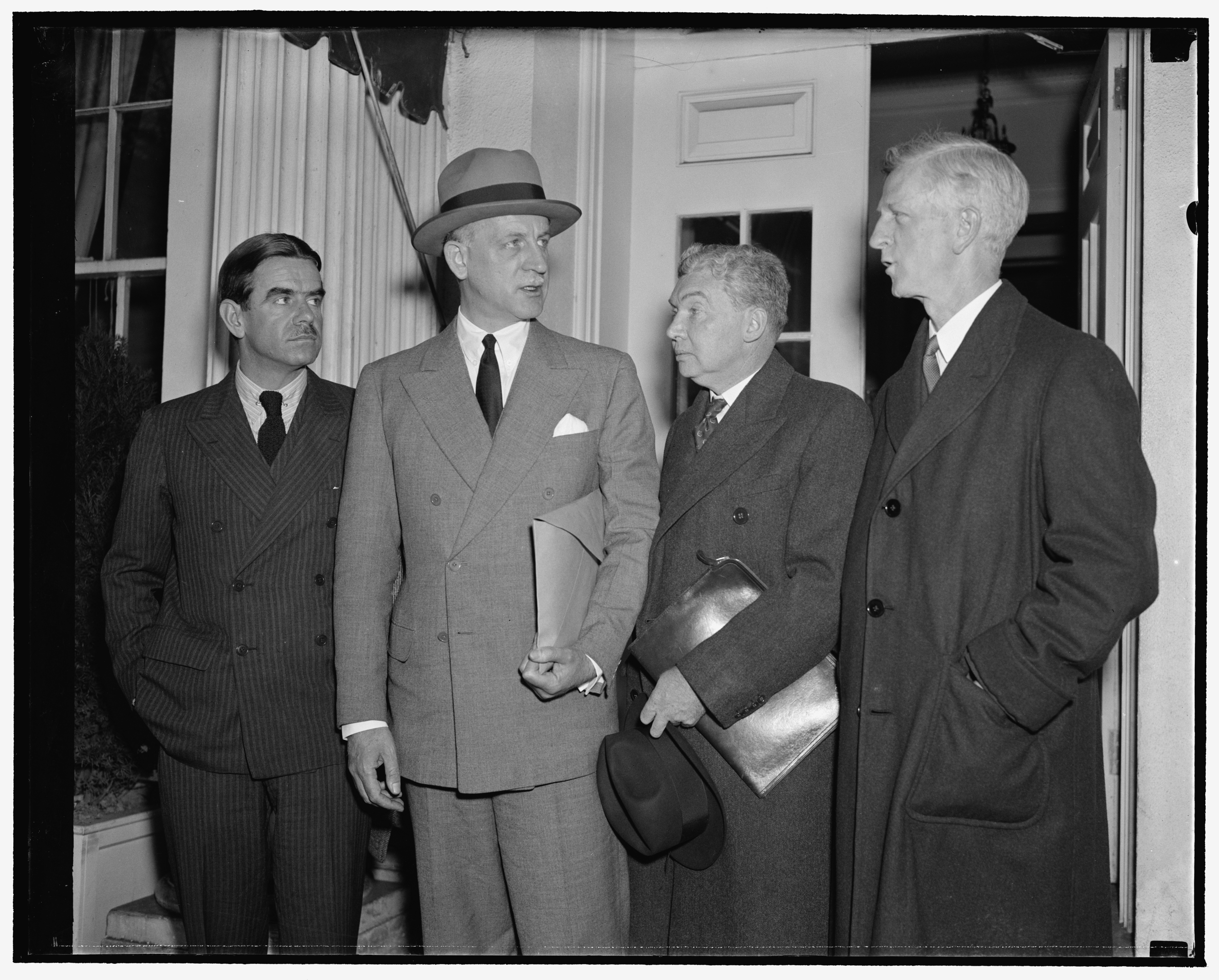
- Refugee Advisory Committee, Left to right: Armstrong, Undersecretary of State Sumner Welles, George I. Warren, James Grover McDonald
- Born: April 7, 1893; New York City, U.S.
- Died: April 24, 1973 (aged 80); New York City, U.S.
- Education: Princeton University
- Occupation: Editor in chief
- Employer: Council on Foreign Relations
- Known for: Foreign Affairs
- Spouses: Helen MacGregor Byrne (b. 1897) (m. 1918–1938) Carman Barnes (m. 1945–1951) Christa von Tippelskirch (m. 1951)

Hamilton Fish Armstrong (April 7, 1893 – April 24, 1973) was an American journalist who is known for editing Foreign Affairs from 1928 to 1972.

== Early life ==
Armstrong was a member of the Fish Family of American politicians. His father was an artist and gentleman farmer. Armstrong was named after his great uncle Hamilton Fish who was Secretary of State in the Ulysses Grant administration. He attended Princeton University, where he was undergraduate reporter for the Daily Princetonian. He graduated from Princeton in 1916.

Although he was raised in a Republican family, Armstrong campaigned for the Woodrow Wilson 1912 presidential campaign.

== Career ==
He began a career in journalism at the business department of The New Republic. During the First World War, he was a military attaché in Serbia, sparking a lifelong interest in American relations with foreign states. Armstrong retained an interest in the Balkans region throughout his career, publishing three books and upwards of ten Foreign Affairs articles on the Balkans. He was also involved in American–Jugoslav societies.

In 1922, at the request of editor Archibald Cary Coolidge, Armstrong became managing editor of Foreign Affairs, the journal of the newly formed Council on Foreign Relations. Armstrong changed the name of the magazine from the Journal of International Relations, which he found “unnecessarily dull” into Foreign Affairs. Armstrong recruited his sisters, Helen and Margaret, to re-draw the logo. After Coolidge's death in 1928, Armstrong became editor, retiring from the position only in 1972, the fiftieth year of publication of the journal.

Armstrong was an internationalist and proponent of open markets. During the Great Depression, he criticized isolationists and argued for America's engagement with the world. In the 1930s, Armstrong persistently warned about the rise of dictatorships in Europe, in particular Nazism. He authored six books condemning dictatorship, including the 1937 bestseller We or They. He argued against neutrality in the years leading up to World War II. Armstrong was a prominent supporter of the Franklin Delano Roosevelt's 1936 presidential campaign.

In 1933, Armstrong interviewed Adolf Hitler shortly after he was named Chancellor of Germany. It was one of Hitler's first interviews with a foreign journalist. During his interview, Armstrong injected multiple times when Hitler was answering. After the interview, Armstrong expressed dissatisfaction about Hitler and concern about what Hitler boded for world politics. Armstrong wrote early of the repression of political opposition underway in Germany, as well as the persecution of Jews.

Armstrong was executive director of the Council on Foreign Relations.

Armstrong wrote many books, including the early Hitler's Reich: The First Phase (published in July, 1933, by The Macmillan Company).

He died after a long illness on April 24, 1973, at the age of 80.

== Personal life ==
Armstrong married three times. Helen MacGregor Byrne became his wife in 1918; their only child, Helen MacGregor (later Mrs. Edwin Gamble), was born on September 3, 1923. Armstrong and Byrne divorced in 1938. Later that year, she married Walter Lippmann, ending the friendship between the two men.

He was born at 58 West 10th Street in New York City, and died at the same location.

Armstrong married author Carman Barnes in 1945, a marriage which ended in a 1951 divorce. In that same year, Armstrong married Christa von Tippelskirch.

== Awards and honors ==
Hamilton Fish Armstrong was decorated by Serbia, Romania, Czechoslovakia, France, and the United Kingdom:

- Order of the Serbian Red Cross (1918)
- Order of St. Sava Fifth Class (1918)
- Chevalier of Order of the White Eagle with Swords (1919)
- Order of the Crown (Rumania) (1924)
- Order of the White Lion of Czechoslovakia (1937)
- Officer of the Legion of Honor of France (1937; commander, 1947)
- Commander of the Order of the British Empire (1972)

He received honorary degrees from Brown (1942), Yale (1957), Basel (1960), Princeton (1961), Columbia (1963), and Harvard (1963) universities. He was elected a member of the American Philosophical Society in 1940.

== Publications ==
=== Books ===
- The New Balkans (1926)
- Where the East Begins (1929)
- Hitler's Reich: The First Phase (1933)
- Europe Between Wars? (1934)
- Can We Be Neutral? (with Allen W. Dulles) (1936)
- "We or They": Two Worlds in Conflict (1936)
- When There Is No Peace. New York: Macmillan (1939)
- Can America Stay Neutral? (with Allen W. Dulles) (1939)
- Chronology of Failure: The Last Days of the French Republic. New York: Macmillan (1940)
- The Calculated Risk (1947)
- Tito and Goliath (1951)
- Those Days (1963)
- Peace and Counterpeace: From Wilson to Hitler: Memoirs of Hamilton Armstrong Fish. New York: Harper & Row (1971)

=== Contributions ===
- Introduction to Refugees: Anarchy or Organization? by Dorothy Thompson. New York: Random House (1938), pp. ix-xi.
