= Nicholas Fish =

American army officer (1758–1833)

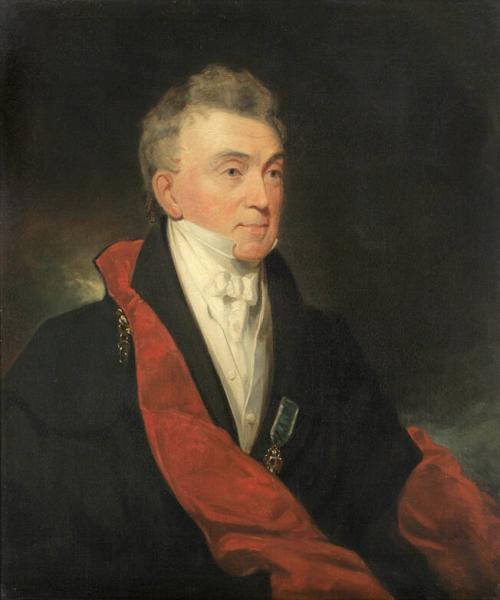

Adjutant General of New York
- In office 1784–1793
- Preceded by: Position established
- Succeeded by: David Van Horne

Personal details
- Born: August 28, 1758 New York City, Province of New York
- Died: June 20, 1833 (aged 74) New York City, New York
- Spouse: Elizabeth Stuyvesant (m. 1803)
- Children: 5, including Hamilton Fish
- Parent(s): Jonathan Fish; Elizabeth Sackett
- Relatives: Nicholas Fish II (grandson); Hamilton Fish II (grandson); Stuyvesant Fish (grandson); Stuyvesant Morris (grandson)
- Education: Princeton University

Nicholas Fish (August 28, 1758 – June 20, 1833) was an American Revolutionary War soldier. He was the first Adjutant General of New York.

== Early life ==
Coat of Arms of Jonathan Fish

Fish was born on August 28, 1758, into a wealthy New York City family. He was the son of Jonathan Fish (1728–1779) and Elizabeth (née Sackett) Fish (d. 1778). His elder sister was Sarah Fish (b. 1755), who married Terrence Riley.

He attended Princeton University but left before graduating to pursue the study of law in the office of John Morin Scott in New York. There he became actively interested in the organization of the Sons of Liberty.

== American Revolutionary War ==
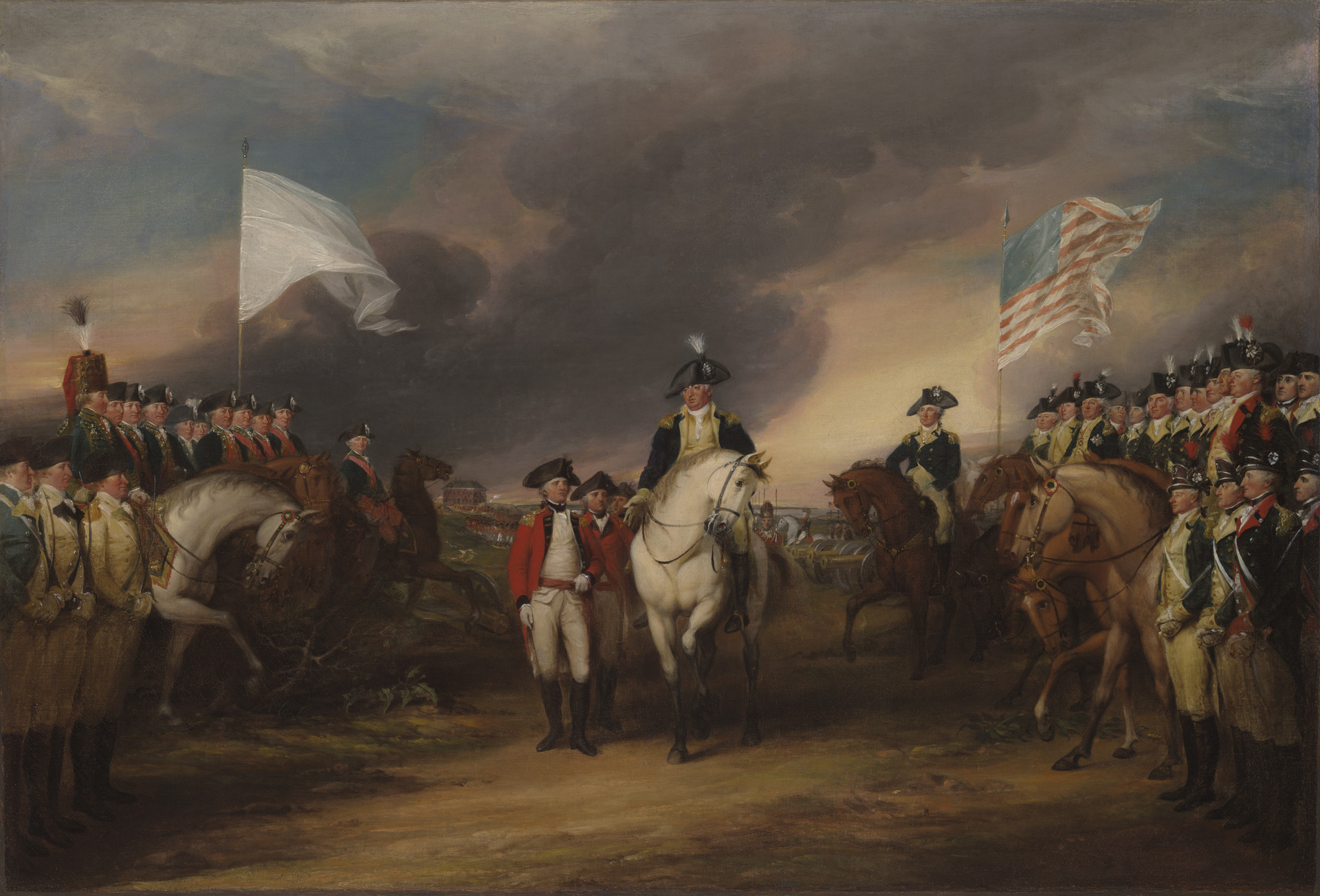
The Surrender of Lord Cornwallis at Yorktown, October 19, 1781, by John Trumbull

In 1776 he was appointed by then brigadier general Scott aide-de-camp on his staff. On August 21, 1776, Fish was appointed major of the 2nd New York Regiment.

He served as a division inspector under Major General von Steuben in 1778. He participated in the Battles of Saratoga and Monmouth, in Sullivan's expedition against the Native Americans in 1779, and in the Virginia and Yorktown campaigns, in which he served for a time on the staff of the Marquis de La Fayette. At Yorktown, he served as second-in-command to Alexander Hamilton, and commanded Hamilton's New York Battalion in the Assault on Redoubt 10 when Hamilton was given overall command. Along with Hamilton, he served in New York Militia Hearts of Oak (1st Battalion/5th Field Artillery Regiment). Nicholas Fish's portrait can be seen at far right bottom row of John Trumbull's Surrender of Lord Cornwallis painting.

Fish was an original member of the New York Society of the Cincinnati and served as its president from 1797 to 1804, and from 1805 to 1806. His son, Hamilton Fish, would serve as the Society's President General from 1854 to 1893.

=== Post-war years ===
In 1786, he was appointed Adjutant General of New York, and he served until 1801. In 1794, he was appointed by Washington supervisor of the Federal revenue in New York City. On two occasions, Fish ran unsuccessfully for United States Congress, losing to Samuel L. Mitchill in 1804 and Gurdon S. Mumford in 1806. Fish also twice ran unsuccessfully for Lieutenant Governor of New York. In 1810, he was the Federalist candidate, but lost to incumbent John Broome. Broome subsequently died one month into his term in August 1810. Fish ran in a special election for Lieutenant Governor in 1811 to fill the vacancy created by Broome's death, but lost to the then-mayor of New York City, DeWitt Clinton. During the War of 1812, Fish served as a member of the City Committee of Defense.

== Personal life ==
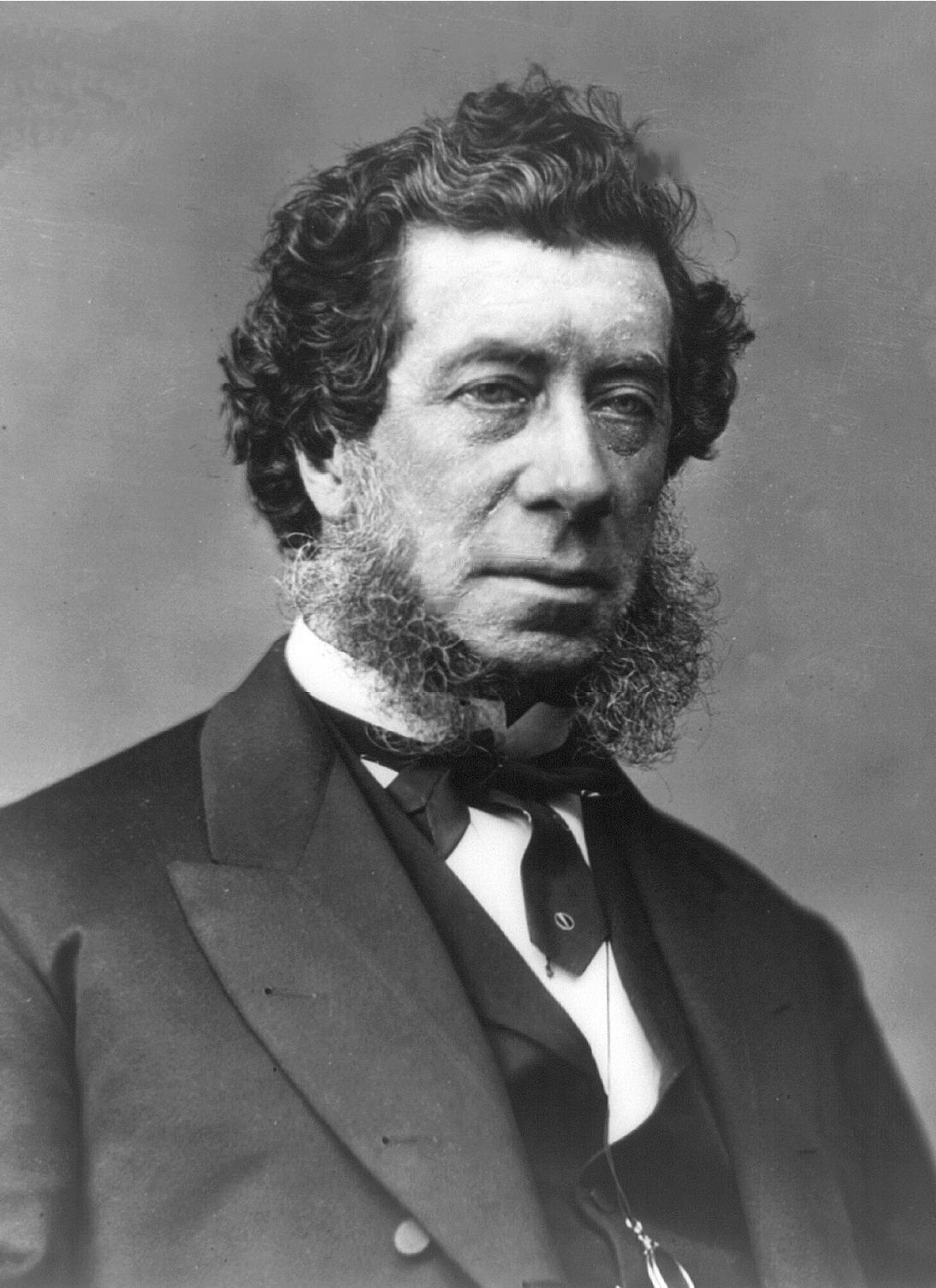
Photograph of Fish's son, Hamilton Fish, a New York governor, United States Senator, and U.S. Secretary of State

In 1803, Fish was married to Elizabeth Stuyvesant (1775–1854), the daughter of Petrus Stuyvesant and Margaret (née Livingston) Stuyvesant (1738–1818). She was the sister of Peter Gerard Stuyvesant (both descendants of Petrus Stuyvesant the last Dutch director-general of the colony of New Netherland), and the granddaughter of Gilbert Livingston and great-granddaughter of Robert Livingston the Elder. Together, they were the parents of:

- Susan Elizabeth Fish (1805–1892), who married Daniel LeRoy (1799–1885), a son of merchant Herman LeRoy.
- Margaret Ann Fish (1807–1877), who married John Neilson (1799–1851).
- Hamilton Fish (1808–1893), who served as New York Governor, United States Senator, and who married Julia Ursin Niemcewiez Kean (1816–1887), sister of John Kean and granddaughter of John Kean.
- Elizabeth Sarah Fish (1810–1881), who married Richard Lewis Morris (1816–1880), the son of James Morris and Helen Van Cortlandt.
- Petrus Stuyvesant Fish (1813–1834), who died young.

Fish died in 1833, and was buried in the churchyard of St. Mark's Church in-the-Bowery in New York City.

=== Descendants ===
Through his son Hamilton, he was the grandfather of Nicholas Fish II (1846–1902), a U.S. Ambassador to Belgium and Switzerland; Hamilton Fish II (1849–1936), a Speaker of the New York State Assembly and a member of the U.S. House of Representatives; Stuyvesant Fish (1851–1923), a President of the Illinois Central Railroad who married Marion Graves Anthon (1853–1915); and New York congressmen Hamilton Fish III and Hamilton Fish IV.

Through his daughter Elizabeth, he was the grandfather of Stuyvesant Fish Morris (1843–1928), a prominent physician.

== See also ==
- Fish family
