= Francis L. Pell =

American architect (1873–1945)

- Born: Francis Livingston Pell; September 23, 1873; New York City, New York, US
- Died: September 7, 1945 (aged 71); New York City, New York, US
- Other name: Levy Pell
- Education: Columbia University School of Mines
- Occupation: Architect
- Partner: Harvey Wiley Corbett
- Practice: Pell & Corbett; George B. Post & Sons

Francis Livingston Pell (September 23, 1873 – September 7, 1945), also known as F. Livington Pell, was an American architect. He practiced with Harvey Wiley Corbett in the New York City firm Pell & Corbett. He also worked for George B. Post & Sons. He is best known for his design of the Maryland Institute and the municipal buildings for Springfield, Massachusetts.

== Early life ==
"Levy" Pell was born in New York City on September 23, 1873. His parents were Melissa "Lily" Augusta Hyatt and Walden Pell. He was a descendant of founding father James Duane. He attended Cutler School where he participated in track.

Pell graduated with a Ph.B. in architecture from the Columbia University School of Mines in 1895. While at Columbia, he was captain of the track team and a member of St. Anthony Hall. He received the McKim Traveling Scholarship in Architecture in 1899, allowing him to spend a year studying in Paris and a year in Rome.

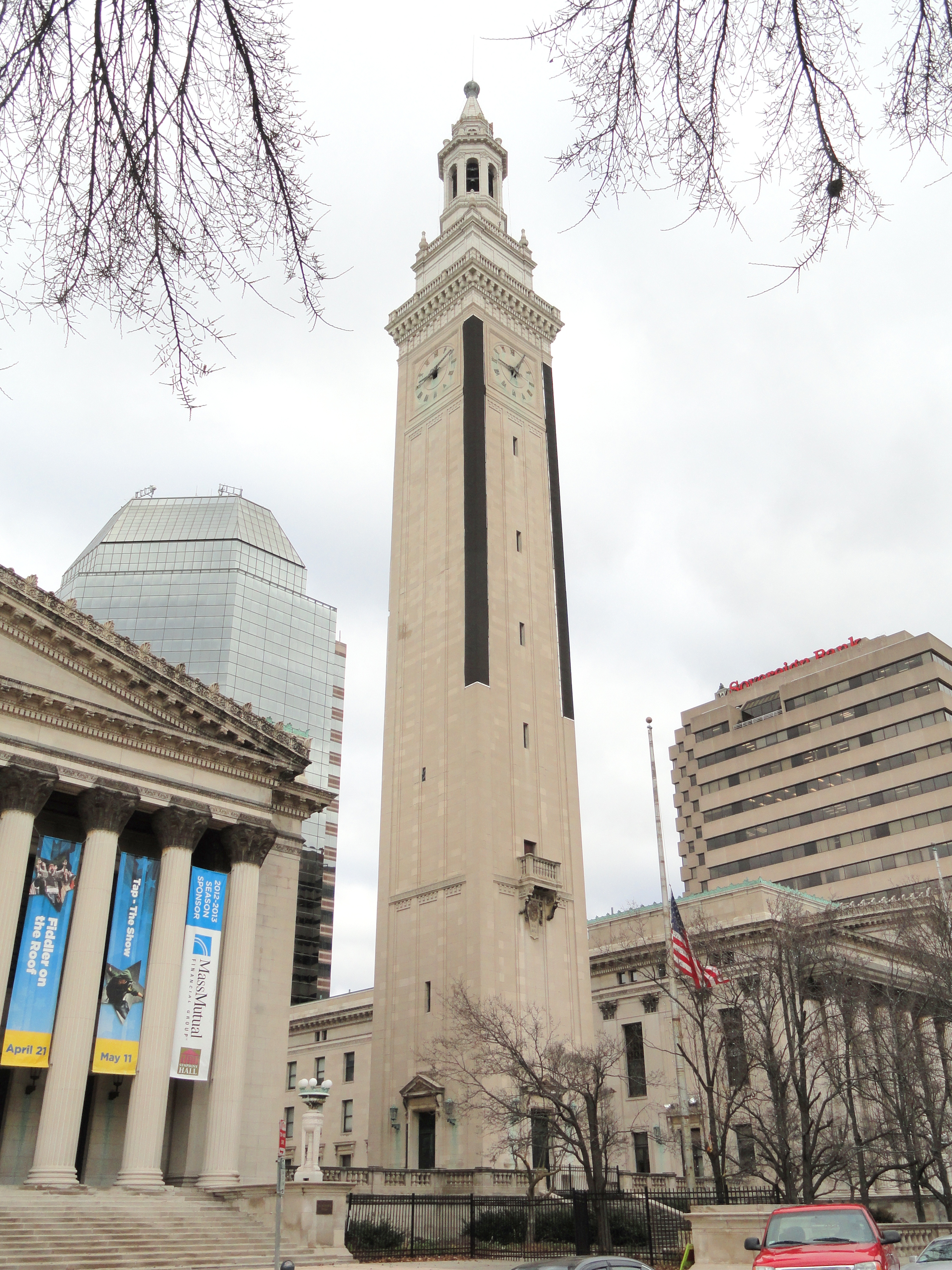
Clock Tower, Springfield, Massachusetts

== Career ==
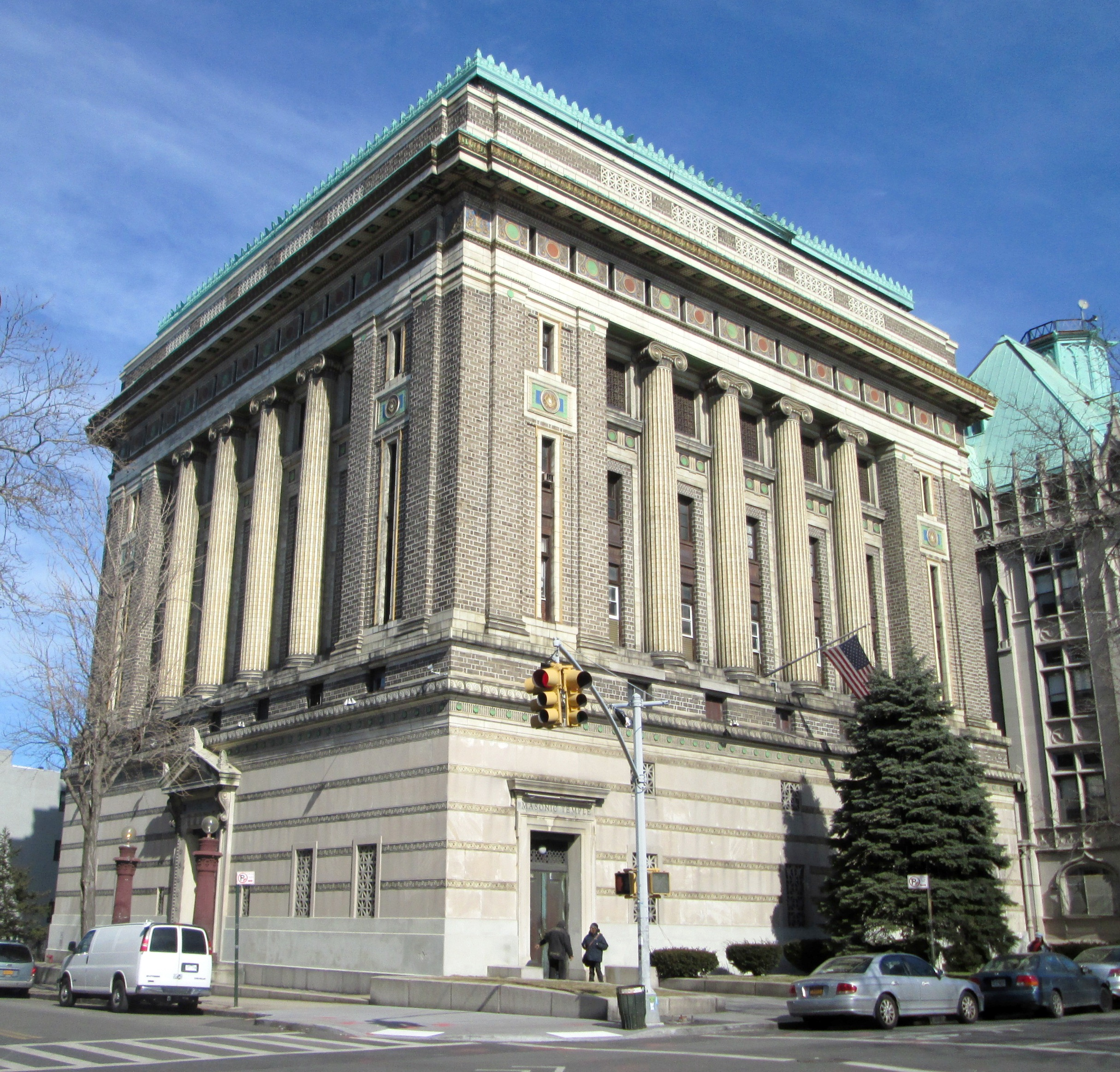
Brooklyn Masonic Temple

Pell joined the firm of George B. Post & Sons in New York City, working on the building designs for City College of New York. Next, he formed a partnership with Harvey Wiley Corbett, establishing the firm Pell & Corbett. Their firm won a competition to design the municipal buildings for Springfield, Massachusetts, including a Byzantine style Clock Tower. They also designed the Brooklyn Masonic Temple in 1906, in association with Lord and Hewlett. Pell & Corbett also won the Medal of Honor from the American Institute of Architects for the Maryland Institute in Baltimore, Maryland.

Pell retired in 1939. He was a member of the American Institute of Architects and the Society of Beaux Arts Architects.

== Personal life ==
Pell married Ellen "Elsie" Van Buren Morris on October 9, 1899, at Calvary Epsicopal Church. Their wedding was conducted by Bishop Henry Y. Satterlee of Washington, D.C. She was the daughter of Ellen James Van Buren and Stuyvesant Fish Morris and was a member the Fish family. She was descended from Lewis Morris and Peter Stuyvesant; on her mother's side she was the great-granddaughter of Martin Van Buren.

After their wedding, the couple spent a year traveling in Europe. Upon their return to New York City, they lived at 14 East 60th Street. In the 1920s, they moved to 168 East 73rd Street in New York City, a property now included in the East 73rd Street Historic District. The Pells had three sons, F. Livingston Pell Jr., Stuyvesant Morris Pell, and Walden Pell.

Pell was a member of the Colonial Lords of the Manor, Rockaway Hunting Club, the Society of Columbia University, and the St. Anthony Club of New York.

He died in his home in New York City on September 7, 1945. He was buried in Quogue Cemetery in Quogue, New York.
