= Stuyvesant Fish Morris =

American physician (1843–1928)

- Born: August 3, 1843; New York City, U.S.
- Died: May 10, 1928 (aged 84); New York City, U.S.
- Education: Columbia University; Columbia Medical School
- Occupation: Physician
- Spouse: Ellen James Van Buren (m. 1868)
- Children: 6
- Relatives: Nicholas Fish (grandfather); Hamilton Fish (uncle); Stuyvesant Fish (cousin); A. Newbold Morris (cousin)

Stuyvesant Fish Morris (August 3, 1843 – May 10, 1928) was an American physician and the progenitor of Manhattan's prominent family of physicians.

== Early life ==
Morris was born in Manhattan on August 3, 1843. He was a son of Richard Lewis Morris (1805–1880) and Elizabeth Sarah Fish (1810–1881). His siblings included Richard Lewis Morris Jr., Elizabeth Stuyvesant Morris, and James Morris.

His maternal grandparents were Nicholas Fish (1758–1833), Adjutant General of New York and Revolutionary War soldier, and Elizabeth (née Stuyvesant) Fish (1775–1854), a descendant of both the Livingston family and Peter Stuyvesant, the last Dutch director-general of New Amsterdam. He was also a nephew of Hamilton Fish, the Governor of New York, U.S. Senator, and U.S. Secretary of State. His paternal grandparents were Helen (née Van Cortlandt) Morris (1768–1812) and James Morris (1764–1827), High Sheriff of New York. His grandfather was a son of Lewis Morris (1726–1798), signor of the Declaration of Independence, from the prominent Colonial-era Morris family of the Morrisania section of the Bronx.

=== Education and training ===
Morris was educated at Columbia College Grammar School. He graduated from Columbia University in 1863, earning an A.B. degree, and in 1866, earning an A.M. degree. He earned his medical degree from Columbia Medical School in 1867. He trained as the acting Assistant Surgeon, United States, house surgeon for the New York Hospital, and as a sanitary inspector.

== Career ==
During the U.S. Civil War, Morris enlisted as a private in the Union Army, Company K, 7th Infantry, New York Regiment on June 1, 1862 and he mustered out on September 5, 1862. The regiment was known as a "Silk Stocking" regiment and "Blue-Bloods" due to the disproportionate number of its members who were part of New York City's social elite, In 1864, he was acting Medical Cadet at Sand's Island and in 1866, he served as acting Assistant Surgeon at Hart and Davids Island during the fourth cholera pandemic.

Morris practiced medicine in New York City for more than 40 years. His office was located at 16 East 30th Street in Manhattan. Dr. Morris was published in The New York Times, the New York Medical Journal and the Brooklyn Medical Journal.

He retired in 1913, and in 1920 was living at 16 East 30th Street in Manhattan. Dr. Morris was a member of the Century Club and the Saint Nicholas Society. He also served as a member of the board of trustees of the Parochial Fund of the Protestant Episcopal Church in the Diocese of New York.

== Personal life ==
On December 10, 1868, he married Ellen James "Elly" Van Buren (1844–1929) at Saint Mark's Church in New York City. Elly's paternal grandfather was the 8th U.S. President Martin Van Buren (1782-1862). They owned a house located in Quogue (a village within Southampton, New York) at the SE corner of Quogue Street and Post Lane, where he was president of the Quogue Field Golf Club. Together, they were the parents of the six children:

- Elizabeth Marshall Morris (1869–1919) who made her debut in 1888. She married Benjamin Woolsey Rogers in 1906.
- Van Buren Morris (1871–1872), who died young.
- Ellen Van Buren Morris (1873–1954) who married Francis Livingston Pell (1873–1945), a descendant of James Duane, in 1899.
- Stuyvesant Morris, who also died young.
- Richard Lewis Morris III (1875–1954), who married Carolyn Whitney Fellowes (b. 1882), a daughter of Cornelius Fellowes, in 1908.
- Stuyvesant Fish Morris Jr. (1877–1925), a stock broker who married Elizabeth Hillis Wynkoop (1878–1930), daughter of Dr. Gerardus Hilles Wynkoop, in 1900. They were the parents of Stuyvesant Fish Morris III (d. 1948).

Morris died at his residence, 116 East 58th Street in Manhattan, on May 10, 1928. His funeral was held at Calvary Church in New York City and was buried at Quogue Cemetery.

=== Philanthropy ===
In 1907, Morris donated 860 letters addressed to President Van Buren, printed circulars and broadsides, 1,700 other letters and political items to the Library of Congress. His donation, along with that of Mrs. Smith Thompson Van Buren, his mother-in-law, rendered the Library "a remarkably full one of political documents bearing upon the middle period [as of 1907] of the history of the United States."
