= The Divorce Colony =

2022 non-fiction book by April White

The Divorce Colony: How Women Revolutionized Marriage and Found Freedom on the American Frontier
- Author: April White
- Subject: Divorce
- Genre: Nonfiction
- Publisher: Hachette Book Group
- Publication date: 2022
- Pages: 228
- ISBN: 9780306827662
- Website: https://thedivorcecolony.com/

The Divorce Colony: How Women Revolutionized Marriage and Found Freedom on the American Frontier is a nonfiction book by April White. Published by Hachette Book Group in 2022, The Divorce Colony examines the role of Sioux Falls, South Dakota, as a destination for divorce seekers through personal stories. Excerpts were published in The Boston Globe, Smithsonian Magazine, and on Politico.

== Summary ==
In the late 19th century, South Dakota with its residency requirement of 90 days was a popular destination for those seeking divorce. Sioux Falls was convenient for railroad travelers, and its Cataract House Hotel housed many members of Sioux Falls' "divorce colony". Reporters kept an eye on the divorce colonists, as many were socialites from wealthy families. Gossipy articles about the divorce suits were published across the United States and Europe.

Some of the colonists featured in the book are Maggie Carey, granddaughter of William Backhouse Astor Sr., who moved to Sioux Falls to obtain a divorce from Alphonse Lambert Eugène, Chevalier de Stuers and would later marry Elliott Zborowski; Mary Nevins who sought to obtain a divorce from Jamie Blaine, son of prominent politician James G. Blaine; (Note: Fifteen years later, Jamie's second wife would also seek a divorce from him in Sioux Falls.) and Blanche Chesebrough who sought to divorce Roland Molineux on the grounds that Molineux had poisoned and killed her love Henry Barnet.

Divorce seekers were thrown into tizzy when the United States Supreme Court decision in Andrews v. Andrews was announced, which threw into question whether a South Dakota divorce decree would be recognized by other states.

Activists against the trend fought for years to change South Dakota's divorce laws, eventually increasing the residency requirement to one year in 1908. Reno, Nevada, with its six-month residency requirement, became a preferred divorce destination. By the 1930s, Nevada's requirement was only six weeks. Throughout the 20th century, states would gradually reduce the barriers to divorce and provide a greater array of acceptable grounds, culminating in California's 1969 no-fault divorce law, which was quickly adopted by most other states. (Note: The last state to institute no-fault divorce was New York in 2010.)

== Reception ==
The review in The Washington Post notes that the divorce colonists "were pioneers in forcing legislatures and society to reexamine how divorce was enforced and perceived". The Wall Street Journal calls it "an entertaining and edifying account of the divorce industry that emerged in Sioux Falls". In Wyoming Tribune Eagle, the reviewer writes that "this book is fascinating, unique, and perfect for historians, readers of women's issues and historical novel lovers." Kirkus Reviews describes The Divorce Colony as "absorbing, thoroughly researched". The reviewer for the Star Tribune notes White's "well-documented research" and observes that White "does not craft a defense of divorce, but a history of its advance".
