= Carman Barnes =

American novelist

Carmen Barnes
- Born: November 20, 1912; Chattanooga, Tennessee, U.S.
- Died: August 19, 1980 (aged 67); Salzburg, Austria
- Education: Girls' Preparatory School; Ward-Belmont School for Girls; Gardner School
- Occupation: Novelist
- Spouse: Hamilton Fish Armstrong
- Parent(s): James Hunter Neal; Lois Diantha Mills
- Relatives: George Pullen Jackson (stepfather)

Carman Dee Barnes (November 20, 1912 – August 19, 1980) was an American novelist.

== Early life ==
Barnes was born on November 20, 1912, in Chattanooga, Tennessee. She was the daughter of James Hunter Neal and poet and folklorist Lois Diantha Mills (1889-1939). Her last name is that of her first stepfather, Wellington Barnes, founder of the Dixie-Portland Cement Company, who died in 1927. Her mother later married musicologist and Vanderbilt University professor George Pullen Jackson.

Barnes attended the Girls' Preparatory School in Chattanooga, the Ward-Belmont School for Girls in Nashville, Tennessee, and the Gardner School in New York City.

== Career ==
Barnes was only sixteen years old when her debut novel, Schoolgirl, was published in 1929. Based on Barnes' own experience at a boarding school for girls, the novel detailed the sexual experimentation, including lesbianism, of Naomi Bradshaw and her fellow students. The scandalous novel was a best seller internationally and got Barnes expelled from the Gardner School when her principal read it. Barnes and dramatist Alfonso Washington Pezet adapted the novel for the stage and it debuted at the Ritz Theatre on Barnes' eighteenth birthday. Starring Joanna Roos as Bradshaw, it was considered a flop and ran only 28 performances. Paramount Pictures purchased the film rights for $30,000, but the novel never made it to the screen. Paramount also signed Barnes to acting and writing contracts, but she never wrote for or acted in films.

Her second novel, Beau Lover (1930), is told entirely in second person singular. She followed this up with Mother, Be Careful! (1932), which satirized Hollywood, and Young Woman (1934), which also featured Naomi Bradshaw. In 1940, she sponsored a lecture series by the architect Claude F. Bragdon which were later collected and published as The Arch Lectures (1942). The next year she studied with esotericist P. D. Ouspensky.

With her husband she collaborated on the unproduced play A Passionate Victorian, about actress Fanny Kemble.

In 1946, Barnes published her final novel, Time Lay Asleep, about a large family in the southern United States. In that book, Barnes experimented with chronological, psychological, and symbolic elements in a way that has been compared to the work of William Faulkner.

== Personal life ==
Barnes became the second wife of writer and diplomat Hamilton Fish Armstrong in 1945. After a long separation, Barnes and Armstrong divorced in 1951. Later that year, Barnes left the United States for Austria permanently. Following a series of breakdowns in 1952, she received insulin shock therapy and psychotherapy treatment.

== Death ==
Barnes died in Salzburg, Austria, in 1980.
