= John Kean (South Carolina politician) =

American merchant and politician (1756–1795)

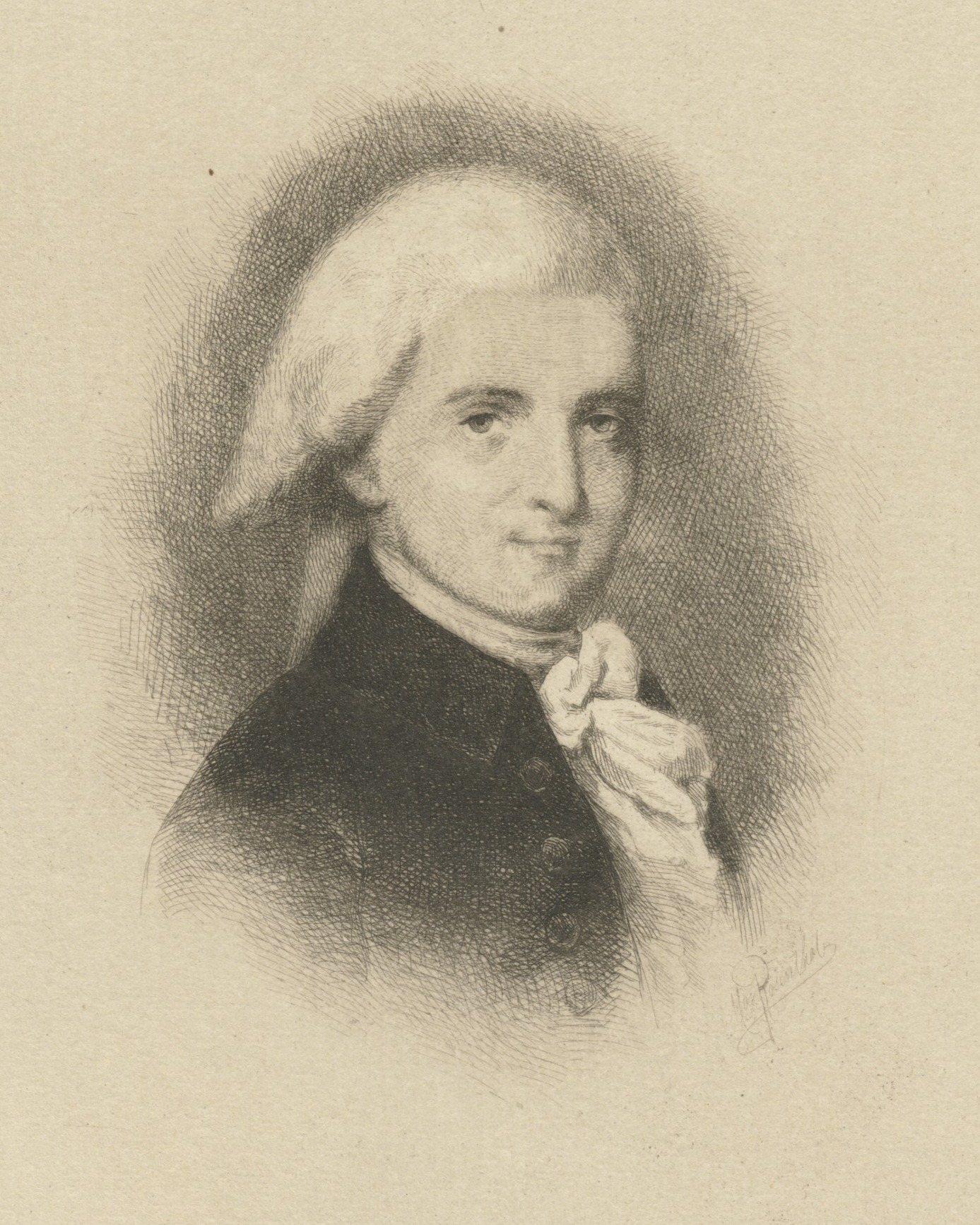
- Etching of John Kean by Max Rosenthal

Member of the Congress of the Confederation
- In office 1785–1787

Personal details
- Born: 1756 Charleston, Province of South Carolina
- Died: May 4, 1795 (aged 38–39) Philadelphia, Pennsylvania, U.S.
- Resting place: St. John’s Churchyard
- Spouse: Susan Livingston (m. 1789)
- Children: Peter Philip James Kean
- Occupation: Merchant, politician, cashier of the Bank of the United States

John Kean (1756 – May 4, 1795) was an American merchant, banker and member of Congress from South Carolina under the Articles of Confederation, who was the first in a long line of American politicians.

Kean was the deputy paymaster of the South Carolina Militia during the American Revolutionary War. He was taken prisoner during the war and was detained at sea for several months, becoming ill with a respiratory ailment. After being set free, Kean became a member of a commission that audited accounts of the Revolutionary Army. Kean also served as a delegate for South Carolina in the Congress of the Confederation from 1785 to 1787. When George Washington became president of the United States, he appointed Kean cashier of the Bank of the United States. Kean served in that capacity until his death.

Two of Kean's descendants have served in the U.S. Senate, one has served as governor of New Jersey, and three have served in the U.S. House of Representatives.

== Early life ==
Kean was born in Charleston, South Carolina, in 1756. He was raised in Beaufort County, South Carolina, by his mother, Jane Grove and stepfather, Captain Samuel Grove, a wealthy and successful merchant.

== Career ==
Kean apprenticed with his stepfather's business partner, Peter Lavien, learning business and bookkeeping. By the time of the American Revolutionary War, Kean was a prominent merchant in his home state of South Carolina.

During the War, he served as deputy paymaster of the South Carolina Militia under paymaster Daniel de Saussure. Kean was taken prisoner during the Siege of Charleston in 1780 by General Sir Henry Clinton. Along with de Saussure's son, Henry William de Saussure, Kean was detained as a prisoner of war at sea for several months and developed a respiratory disease. Upon his release, Kean was appointed a member of the commission to audit accounts of the Revolutionary Army by General Washington.

Kean also served as a delegate for South Carolina in the Congress of the Confederation from 1785 to 1787. Kean advocated ratification of the United States Constitution at South Carolina's ratifying convention. Kean compiled "actual enumerations" of the population of the 13 states for consideration at the Constitutional Convention in 1787, a precursor to the U.S. Census.

After General Washington became the first President of the United States, he appointed Kean cashier of the Bank of the United States in Philadelphia. Kean held this position for the rest of his life.

== Personal life ==
Coat of Arms of John Kean

In 1789, Kean was married to Susan Livingston (1759–1853) of the prominent northern Livingston family. Susan was the daughter of Peter Van Brugh Livingston, the New York State Treasurer, and Mary (née Alexander) Livingston. She was also the granddaughter of Philip Livingston, the 2nd Lord of Livingston Manor, and the niece of New Jersey's governor William Livingston, a signer of the Declaration of Independence and the U.S. Constitution. Together, they were the parents of one child:

- Peter Philip James Kean (1788–1828), who married Sarah Sabina Morris (1788–1878), a granddaughter of Lewis Morris.

Kean died at age 39 on May 4, 1795, in Philadelphia from the respiratory disease he developed during the Revolution. He was interred in St. John's Churchyard in Philadelphia.

Following his death his widow purchased a large estate known and home built by her governor uncle, known as Liberty Hall, which showcases the contributions of the Livingston and Kean families. In 1800, his widow remarried to Count Julian Niemcewicz, a Polish nobleman who fled Poland after fighting unsuccessfully for Polish independence from Russia but returned in the wake of Napoleon's successful campaigns.

=== Descendants ===
Through his grandson, Col. John Kean, Kean was posthumously a great-grandfather of John Kean and Hamilton Fish Kean, who both served as U.S. Senators for New Jersey. His great-great-grandson was US Representative Robert Winthrop Kean, his great-great-great-grandson is New Jersey Governor Thomas Kean, and his great-great-great-great-grandson is US Representative Thomas Kean Jr.
