= Teresa Phillips =

American basketball player (born 1958)

Teresa Lawrence Phillips (born 1958) was the athletic director at Tennessee State University, a post she had held since 2001. She was one of the few female athletic directors at a school that sponsors football. She was also the head women's basketball coach at TSU and Fisk University, and led the Tiger men for one game in 2003—becoming the first woman to coach a Division I men's basketball team.

== Career ==
A Chattanooga native, Phillips—then known as Teresa Lawrence—attended Vanderbilt University on an academic scholarship. She played center on the school's club women's basketball team. In her sophomore year, 1977–78, Vanderbilt upgraded women's basketball to intercollegiate status, with Phillips as a member—becoming Vanderbilt's first black female athlete.

Phillips started at center in her sophomore and junior years, but lost her starting spot when the Commodores started adding more scholarship players. Nonetheless, she was named Lady Commodore Athlete of the Year in 1980, and also won the Nashville Civitans' Sportsmanship Award in 1979 and 1980.

Phillips graduated in 1980. She was working as an insurance broker in Atlanta when Vanderbilt's first full-time women's coach, Phil Lee, asked her to come back to Nashville as a part-time assistant. She stayed at Vanderbilt from 1981 to 1984, winning the National Women's Invitational Tournament in 1984. She was hired as head coach at Division III Fisk, also in Nashville, in 1984, and tallied a record of 62–38 in five years, winning two Women's Intercollegiate Athletic Conference titles. She moved to nearby TSU in 1989, taking over a team that had won a total of eight games in three years. She went 150–151 in 11 years, winning consecutive Ohio Valley Conference regular season tournament titles in 1994 and 1995. She also served as interim athletic director on two occasions while still serving as coach. She was named interim athletic director for a third time in June 2001, and had the "interim" tag removed in 2002.

== A woman coaching a men's basketball team ==
In December 2002, men's basketball coach Nolan Richardson III got into a fight with assistant coach Hosea Lewis and brought a gun into the Gentry Center. Phillips suspended Richardson and named Lewis interim coach. Richardson resigned a few weeks later, and Phillips named Lewis interim coach for the rest of the season. In February 2003, TSU and Eastern Kentucky got into a fight-marred game that saw 19 players ejected. Conference rules required Lewis to sit out one game. Rather than force 26-year-old assistant Chris Graves, who only two years' coaching experience, to lead the team, Phillips named herself interim coach for the Tigers' game against Austin Peay. The Tigers lost, 71–56. Although Phillips still sees this as the low point of her tenure as athletic director, Sports Illustrated named her one of the "101 Most Influential Minorities In Sports" for 2003.
